= Choker setter =

Logger who attaches cables to logs for retrieval by skidders or skylines

Choker setters at work attaching a log to a skyline in Cowlitz County, Washington (October 1941)

A choker setter or choke setter is a logger who attaches cables to logs for retrieval by skidders or skylines. The work process involves the choker setter wrapping a special cable end (choker) around a log and then moving clear so the yarding engineer (e.g. skidder operator) can pull the log to a central area. In clearcutting, fallers will typically cut down all the trees and limb and buck them into logs before the choke setters and others arrive to remove the logs. New chokers are often radio controlled, making the job both easier and safer.

== See also ==
- Donkey puncher
