= Spar (tree) =

Anchor point in high lead logging

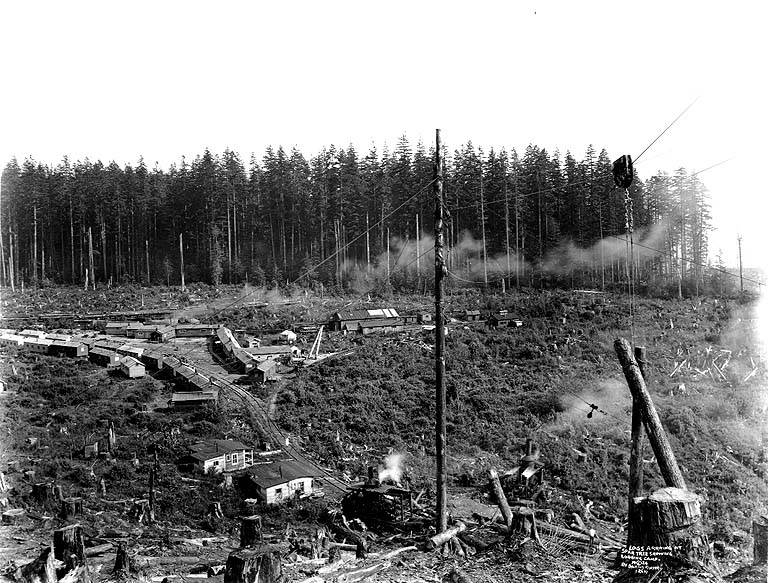
Spar tree at a logging camp in the United States, 1924

A spar tree is the tree used as the highest anchor point in a high lead cable logging setup. The spar tree is selected based on height, location and especially strength and lack of rot in order to withstand the weight and pressure required. Once a spar tree is selected, a climber would remove the tree's limbs and top the tree (a logging term for cutting off the top of the tree). Block and tackle is then affixed to the tree and cabling is run. The tree was used with Steam Donkeys and locomotives. It was a branchless tree that was rigged with lots of cables, pulleys, and carriages that was all connected by a steam donkey.

A "high climber" is the member of the logging crew who scales the tree, limbs it, and tops it.

Selecting a tree as a spar is a particularly important task, so the strength and importance of the spar came to hold symbolic meaning for early loggers of the West.

The use of spar trees in logging is now rare, having been replaced since the 1970s by portable towers, called yarders, which can be erected on logging sites and moved as needed.
