= Steam donkey =

Steam-powered winch or logging engine

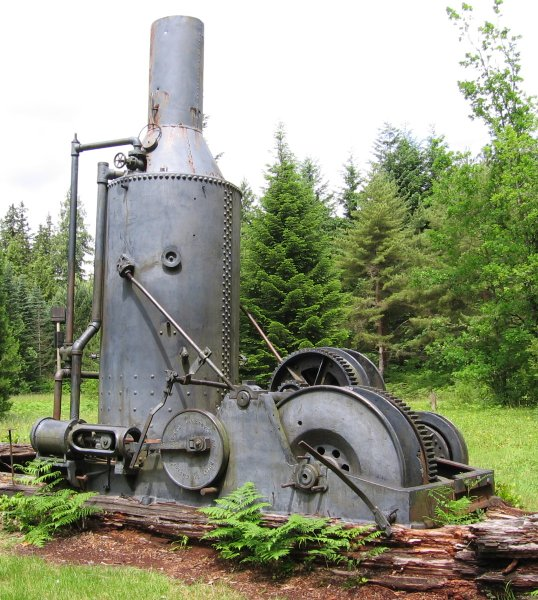
12×14 Empire steam donkey in the UBC Malcolm Knapp Research Forest, Maple Ridge, British Columbia, Canada

A steam donkey, or donkey engine, is a steam-powered winch once widely used in logging, mining, maritime, and other industrial applications.

Steam-powered donkeys were commonly found on large metal-hulled multi-masted cargo vessels in the later decades of the Age of Sail on through the Age of Steam, particularly heavily sailed skeleton-crewed windjammers.

A donkey used in forestry, also known as a logging engine, was often attached to a yarder for hauling logs from where trees were felled to a central processing area. The operator of a donkey was known as a donkeyman.

== Name ==
Steam donkeys acquired their name from their origin in sailing ships, where the "donkey" engine was typically a small secondary engine used to load and unload cargo and raise the larger sails with small crews, or to power pumps. They were classified by their cylinder type – simplex (single-acting cylinder) or duplex (a compound engine); by their connection to the winches (or "drums") – triple-drum, double-drum, etc.; and by their different uses.

A good deal of the cable-logging terminology derived from 19th-century merchant sailing, as much of the early technology originated in that industry. Common logging terms include high-lead yarder, ground-lead yarder, loader, snubber, and incline hoist.

== History ==
=== In logging ===
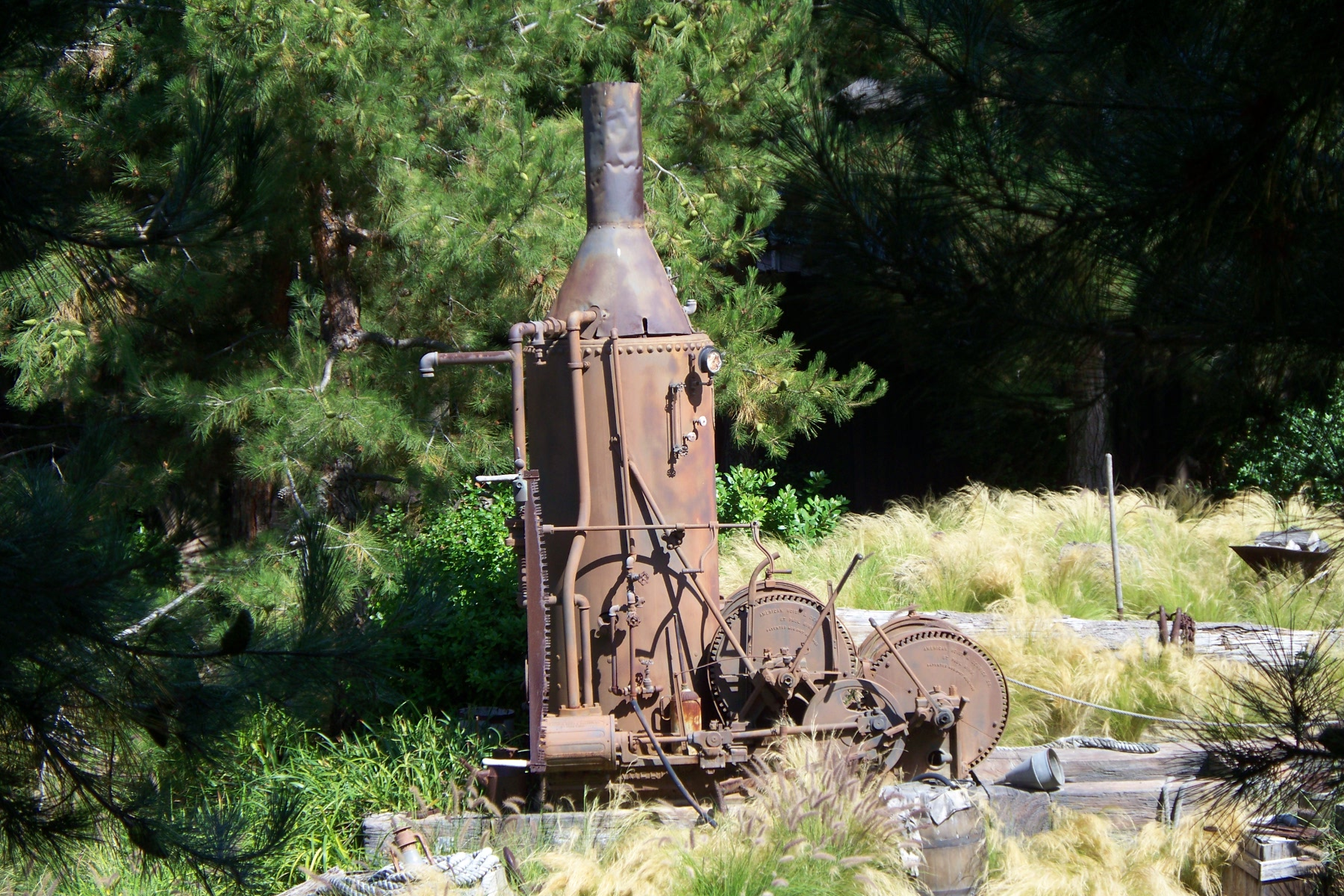
Steam donkey on display at Disney California Adventure Park theme park

John Dolbeer, a founding partner of the Dolbeer and Carson Lumber Company in Eureka, California, invented the logging engine in that city in August 1881. The patent (number: 256553) was issued April 18, 1882. On Dolbeer's first model, a 46-metre (150 ft), 110-millimetre (4.5 in) manila rope was wrapped several times around a gypsy head (vertically mounted spool) and attached at the other end to a log.

The invention of the steam donkey increased lumber production by enabling the transport of trees that would previously have been left behind because they were too large to move. They also enabled logging in hot or cold weather, which was not previously possible with the use of animal power.

Later, the invention of the internal-combustion engine led to the development of the diesel-powered tractor crawler, which eventually made the steam donkey obsolete. Though some have been preserved in museums, very few are in operating order. A great number still sit abandoned in the forests.

== Design ==
A logging donkey consists of a steam boiler and steam engine, connected to a winch mounted on a sled called a donkey sled. The donkeys were moved by simply dragging themselves with the winch line, originally hemp rope and later steel cable. They were used to move logs, by attaching lines to the logs and hauling them.

The larger steam donkeys often had a "donkey house" (a makeshift shelter for the crew) built either on the skids or as a separate structure. Usually, a water tank, and sometimes a fuel oil tank, was mounted on the back of the sled. In rare cases, steam donkeys were also mounted on wheels. Later steam donkeys were built with multiple horizontally mounted drums/spools.

== Use ==
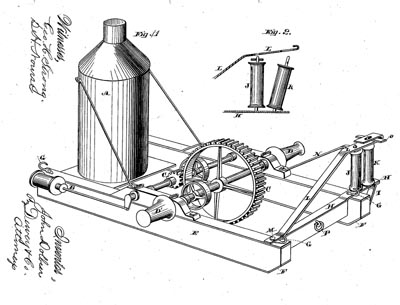
Dolbeer "Logging Engine" (Patent 256,553)

In the simplest logging setup, a "line horse" would carry the cable out to a log where its tree had been downed. The cable would be attached, and, on signal, the donkey's operator (an engineer) would open the regulator, allowing the steam donkey to drag, or "skid", the log towards it. The log was taken either to a mill or to a "landing" where it would be transferred for onward shipment by railroad, road or river – either send down a flume, loaded onto boats, or floated directly in the water, often becoming part of a large log raft or "boom". Later, a "haulback" drum was added to the donkey, where a smaller cable could be routed around the "setting" and connected to the end of the heavier "mainline" to replace the line horse.

A donkey was moved by attaching one of its cables to a tree, stump or other strong anchor, then dragging itself overland to the next yarding location.

In Canada, and in particular Ontario, the donkey engine was often mounted on a barge that could float and thus winch itself over both land and water. Log booms would be winched across water with the engine, after which it would often be reconfigured with a saw to mill the timber.

=== Operator ===
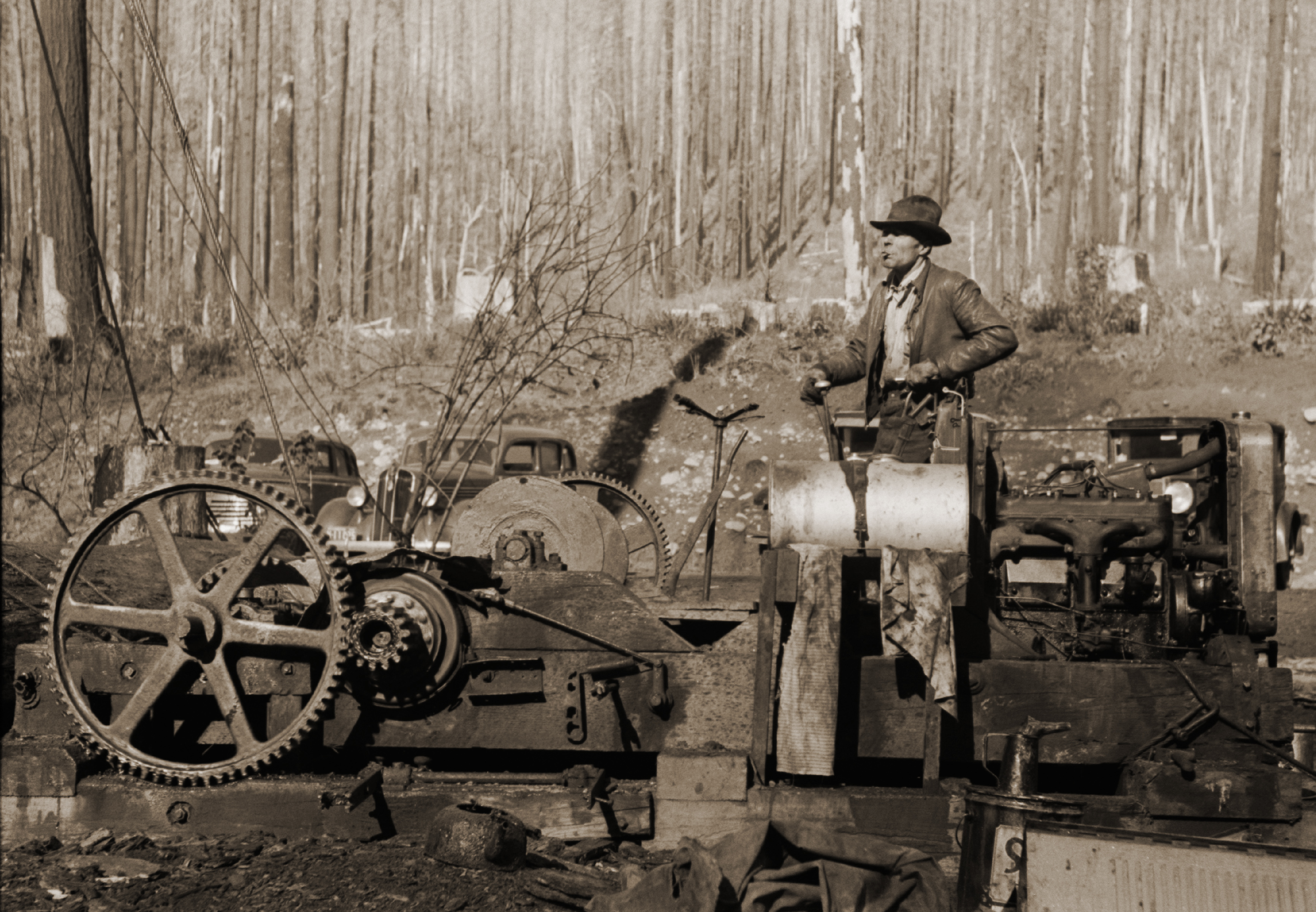
A "donkey puncher" on the job in a gyppo logging operation in Tillamook County, Oregon. (October 1941)

A logging donkey would be operated by an engineer called since about 1920 a donkey puncher.

In later times the donkey puncher was too far away from the end of the line for verbal communication, so whistle codes were developed similar to those used by tug boats employing steam whistles. The whistle operator was known as a whistle punk, who was placed between the men attaching the cables (choker setters), and the donkey puncher, so that he could see the choker setters. When the cables were attached, a series of whistle blows signaled the donkey to begin pulling and the choker setters to stay out of harm's way.

The process was a closely orchestrated sequence of actions, where mistakes were often fatal and where good men stood in line for the jobs. Although the steam engine, and its whistle, have been replaced by gasoline and diesel engines, the whistle codes are still used in many current logging operations. The whistle has been replaced largely with airhorns.

=== Other uses ===
Steam donkeys were also found to be useful for powering other machines such as pile drivers, slide-back loaders (also known as "slide-jammers", cranes which were used to load logs onto railroad cars and which moved along the flat-bed rail cars that were to be loaded), and cherry pickers (a sled-mounted crane used for loading, onto railroad cars, logs that a grading crew had cut down). Sailing fishing vessels on the North sea operated vertical steam-driven capstans called 'the donkey' to haul fishing lines and nets, some of which are still operating today, even though converted to compressed air.

Some steamboats used a steam-driven donkey hoisting-engine with capstan, ropes and strong poles (spars) to move "walk" the boat over or away from reefs and sandbars.

An auxiliary engine on a sailing craft (which does propel the vessel) is still sometimes informally known as "the donk".

== Preserved examples ==
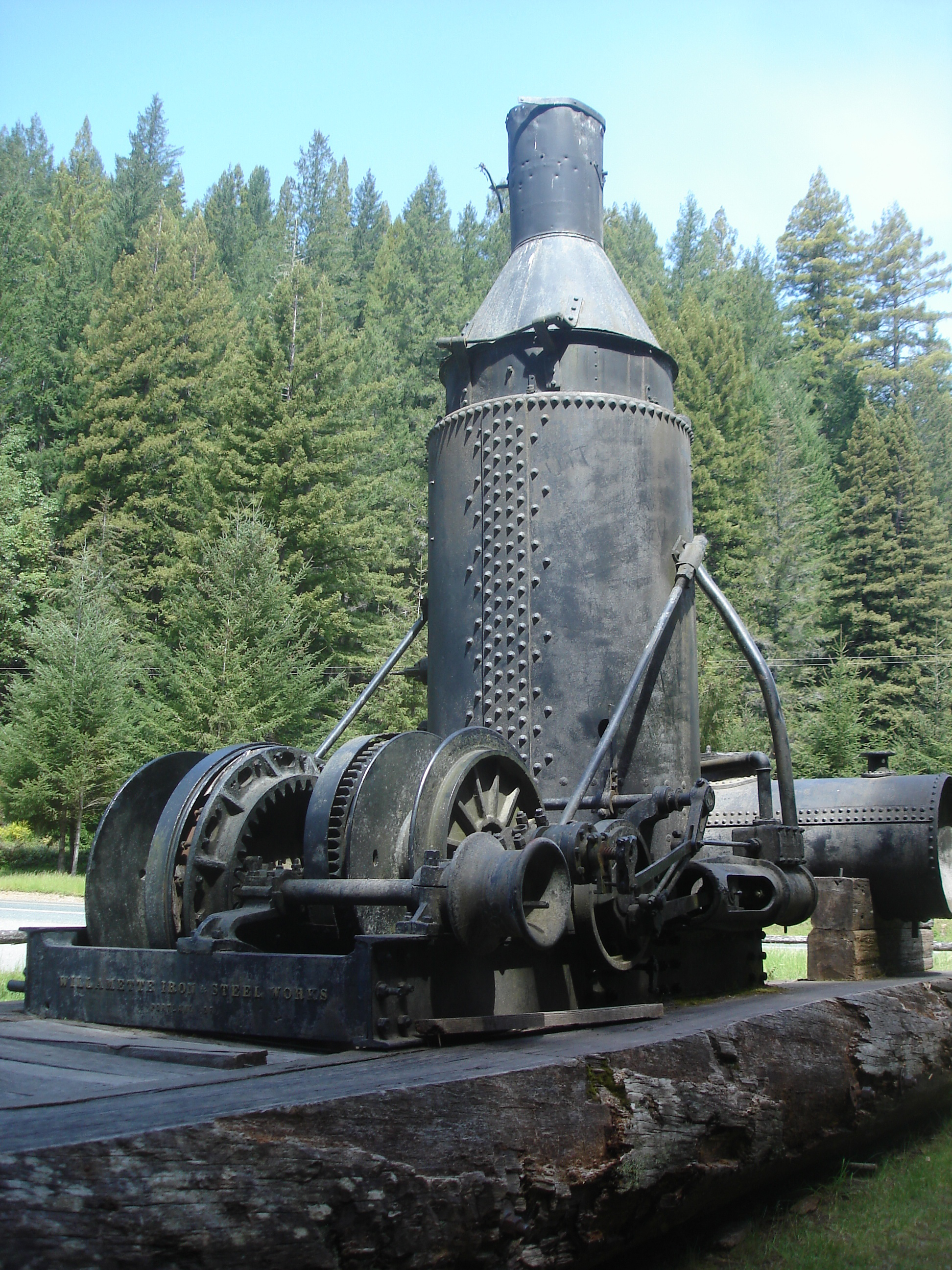
Willamette Steam donkey preserved at Caspar Lumber Company Camp 20 adjacent to California State Route 20

A functioning steam donkey is on display and occasionally operated at Fort Humboldt State Historic Park in Eureka, California. A non-functioning steam donkey accompanied by a plaque explaining the history of the machine is on permanent display at Grizzly River Run, an attraction at Disney California Adventure Park. Another collection of steam donkeys is located at the Point Defiance Park, Camp 6 Logging Museum located in Tacoma, Washington. The collection includes various steam donkeys, including one of the last very large ones built, and others at various stages of restoration.

Another steam donkey is on display along an interpretive trail at the Sierra Nevada Logging Museum in Calaveras County, California, an indoor open-air museum about the Sierra Nevada logging industry and history.

Another steam donkey is preserved at Roaring Camp Railroads park in Felton, California.

Another steam donkey is preserved at Legoland Billund on their Wild West gold-mine-themed railroad.

On August 1, 2009, a Steam Donkey was officially unveiled at McLean Mill National Historic Site in Port Alberni, British Columbia. It is now the only commercially operating steam donkey in North America. On that occasion, due to extreme fire risk, demonstrations of the donkey were not performed, but the logs hauled by previous test runs of the donkey (and had been loaded onto a truck) were dumped into the McLean Mill millpond, representing the first steam-powered commercial logging operation in North America in decades. This machine continued to operate after R. B. Mclean shuttered the steam-powered McLean Mill site in 1965. It ran until 1972 and was abandoned on site. It was restored by the Alberni Valley Industrial Heritage Society in 1986 for Expo 86 and, more recently, was re-certified for commercial use at McLean Mill. Agreements have been made with forestland owner Island Timberlands (owned by Brookfield Asset Management) to log, mill, and sell trees and lumber from the surroundings of McLean Mill.

A wide-face steam donkey (called that because the width of the drum is greater in proportion to that in later machines) has been operational at the Tillamook County Pioneer Museum in Tillamook, Oregon, since the early 1980s. Manufactured by the Puget Sound Iron & Steel Works in the early 1900s, this donkey was abandoned in the woods when the Reiger family finished logging their land in about 1952. The steam donkey was rescued and restored from 1979 to 1981. It was donated to the Pioneer Museum by the Ned Rieger family and has been on display on the Museum grounds.

A vertical steam capstan called "donkey" for hauling fishing lines and nets is preserved on the museum fishing vessel Balder in the historic harbour of Vlaardingen (near Rotterdam), the Netherlands.

Another steam donkey is located on the Monarch Lake Loop in the Indian Peaks Wilderness near Grand Lake, Colorado on Arapaho Pass Trail #6. This steam donkey was used by the, now abandoned and flooded, town of Monarch to harvest logs from the mountain sides.

== See also ==
- "Donkey Riding"
- Donkey jacket, so named because it was worn by donkeymen
- Geared steam locomotive—often used on forestry railways
- Lidgerwood—manufacturer of steam-powered logging equipment
- Range extender – auxiliary combustion engine used on battery vehicles
- Steam power during the Industrial Revolution
- Timeline of steam power
- Yarder – a larger steam-powered logging machine
