= Shovel logging =

Log transport method

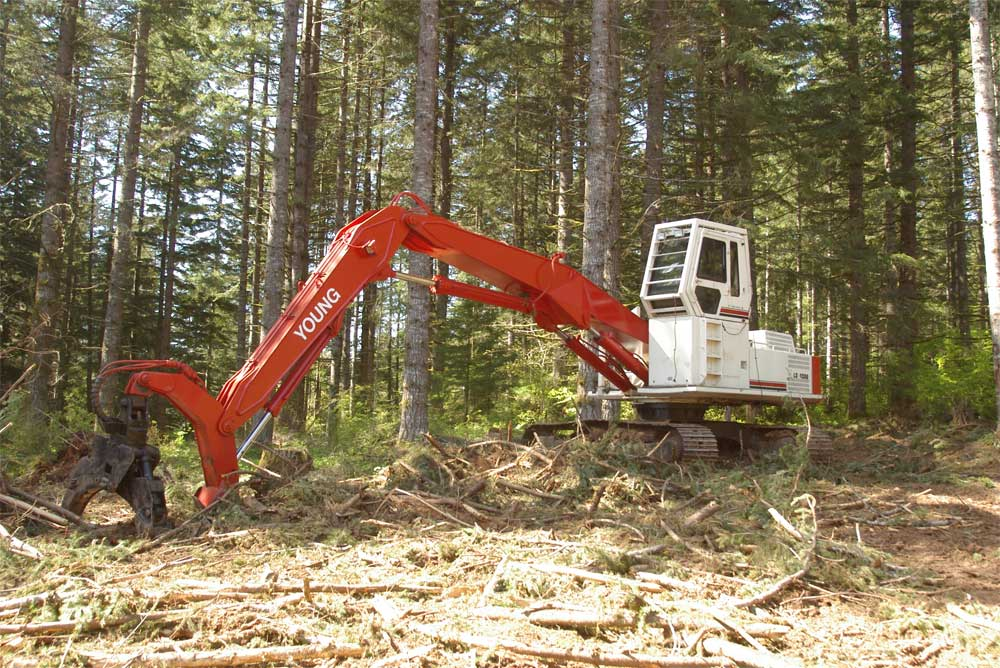
Log Loader

Shovel logging, sometimes called Hoe Chucking, uses a log loader to swing logs to the forest road. Shovel logging is one of a number of methods that may be used to move logs from forest to road. Rather than driving out to the log and dragging it back to the landing, the loader moves slowly across the harvest area, grabbing logs/trees within reach, and swinging them around to drop them closer to the road. Logs further from the road can be shoveled to the landing in a few passes back and forth.

Skidding and cable logging can be more cost efficient for logs further from the road. Shovel logging can make use of the loader between log truck arrivals. It can also reduce soil disturbance, since it requires only a single pass to move all the logs in reach.

The machine shown here is typical of the 'shovels' used for shovel logging. It is a modified excavator or 'shovel'. The name dates back to a previous generation of equipment when loggers uses power shovels (often with a different boom) to load logs.
