= Wirkkala =

Surname list

Wirkkala is a surname. Notable people with the surname include:

- Ilmari Wirkkala, Finnish architect
- Oscar Wirkkala (1880–1959), Finnish-American logger and inventor
- Tapio Wirkkala (1915–1985), Finnish designer and sculptor
- Teemu Wirkkala (born 1984), Finnish javelin thrower
