= Oscar Wirkkala =

Oscar Wirkkala (Finnish pronunciation: [ˈʋirkːɑlɑ]; October 30, 1880 – January 25, 1959) was a Finnish-American logger and inventor who spent much of his life in the Pacific Northwest.

== Background ==
Oscar Wirkkala was born in Kaustinen, Finland. His father Abraham and brother Andrew arrived in America first, working at a saw mill in Cosmopolis, Washington, to save money to pay for the migration of the rest of the family. Oscar arrived next, in 1898, followed closely by his mother, a sister, and three younger brothers. The family lived in the Naselle and Deep River area of Washington from 1899 to 1905.

== Career ==
Wirkkala invented and developed the high lead method of logging. This skyline (or "spar") method, ideally suited for steep terrain, revolutionized the industry. He also invented important pieces of that industry's machinery used during the first half of the 20th century, including the ubiquitous choker hook.

His first patent was granted in 1917, and was for a four-drum donkey engine used in his high lead logging system. In the following years, several of his patented devices were manufactured, under the Wirkkala brand, at the Willapa Harbor Iron Works in South Bend. A few of his patented inventions were still in manufacture well into the second half of the 20th century. Wirkkala sued his own patent attorney for patent infringement on the choker hook, and after several years of litigation the suit was decided in Wirkkala's favor. Later, Wirkkala developed and patented a marine propeller. In the course of his career he patented at least 18 different inventions.

== Personal life ==
Oscar Wirkkala married twice. In 1908, Wirkkala married Johanna Mustola and the couple had three children. A year after Johanna's untimely death in 1913, Oscar married Ida Haverinen. Oscar Wirkkala died in Seattle, Washington.

== Legacy ==
Wirkkala was one of the original fifty persons inducted into the Washington State Hall of Fame. Wirkkala was added to the Washington state Centennial Hall of Honor in 1985.
