= Skidding (forestry) =

Transportation of trees in logging

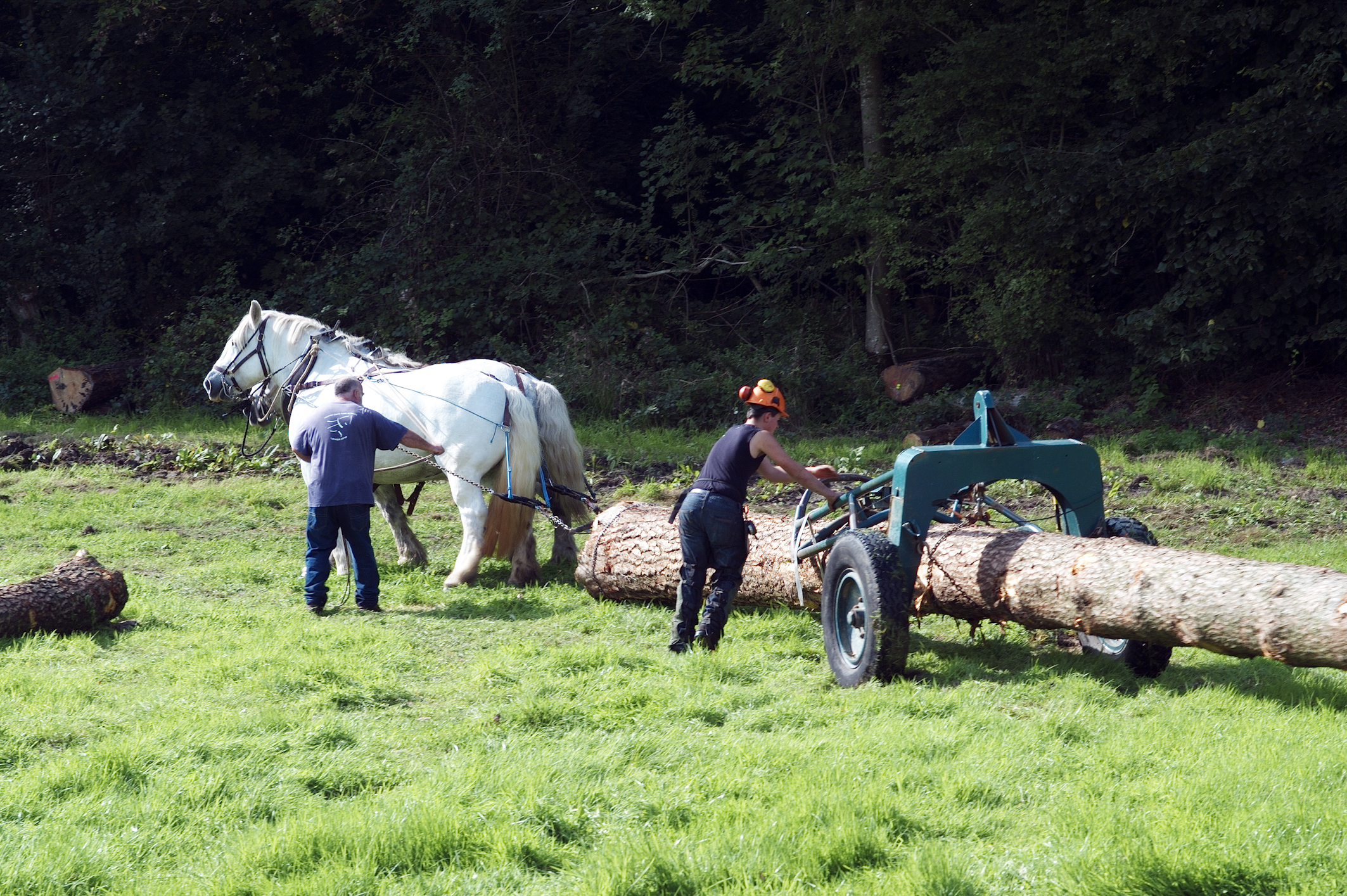
Two-wheeled skidding with Percheron horses.

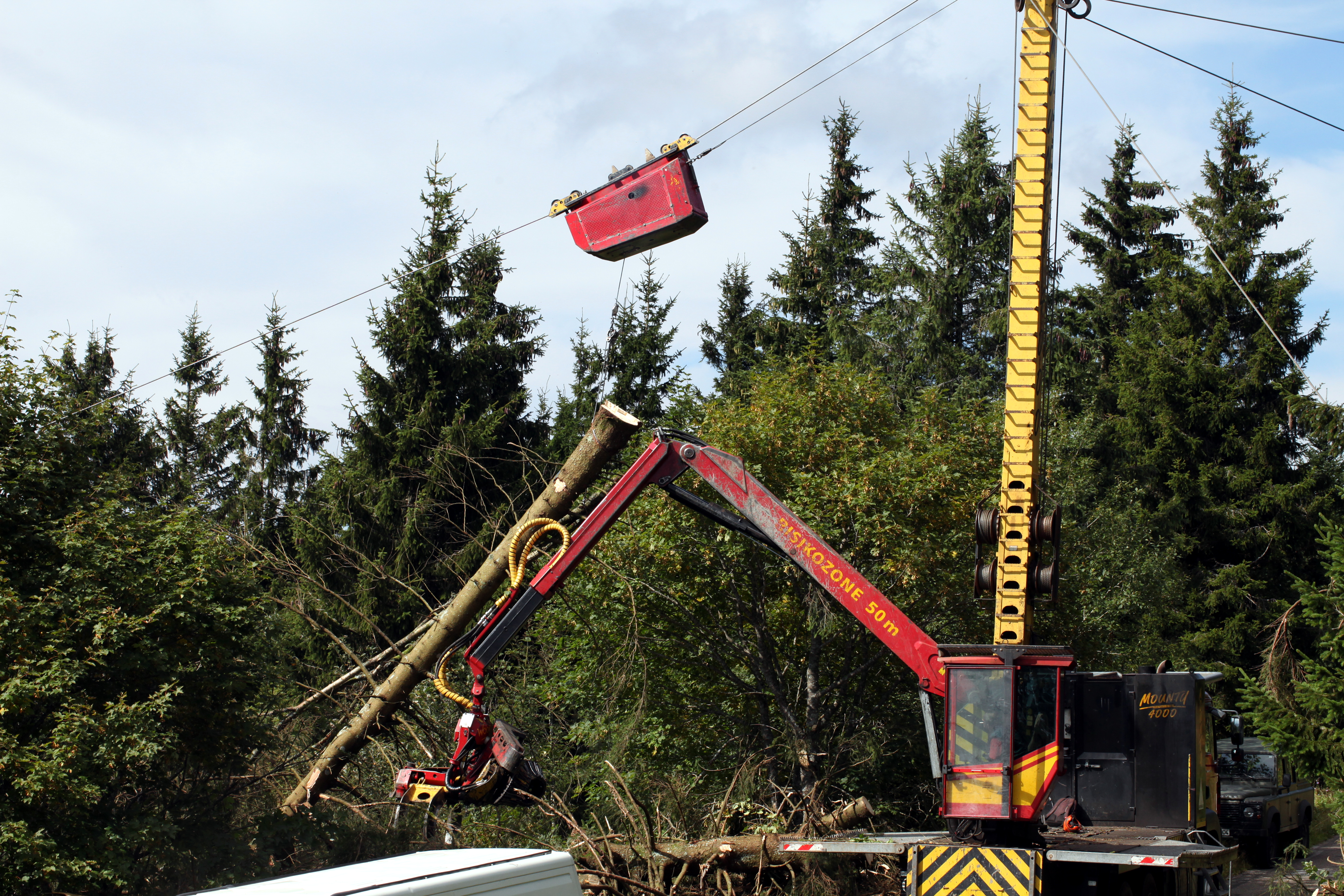
Cable logging.

Skidding in forestry is the first step in moving timber after trees have been felled. Logs are taken from the stump to a loading point, called a landing, beside a road, track or river, where they can be carried further.

Methods include dragging logs along the ground with animals or machines, using sledges or carts, floating them down rivers or Log flume, hauling them on cables, and, in mountain areas, lifting them out by helicopter. Until railways spread, dragging and floating were the most common methods. In the 20th century, machines largely took over, but they can compact soil and damage forests.

Horses and cable systems are now used where protecting the ground matters, such as in nature reserves and wet areas, though horse skidding can cost more per cubic metre of timber.

== Ancient skidding method ==
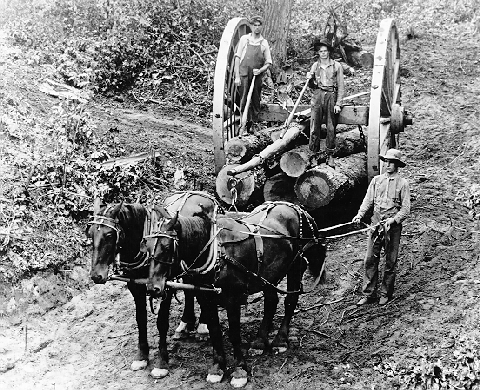
Skidding (circa 1900).

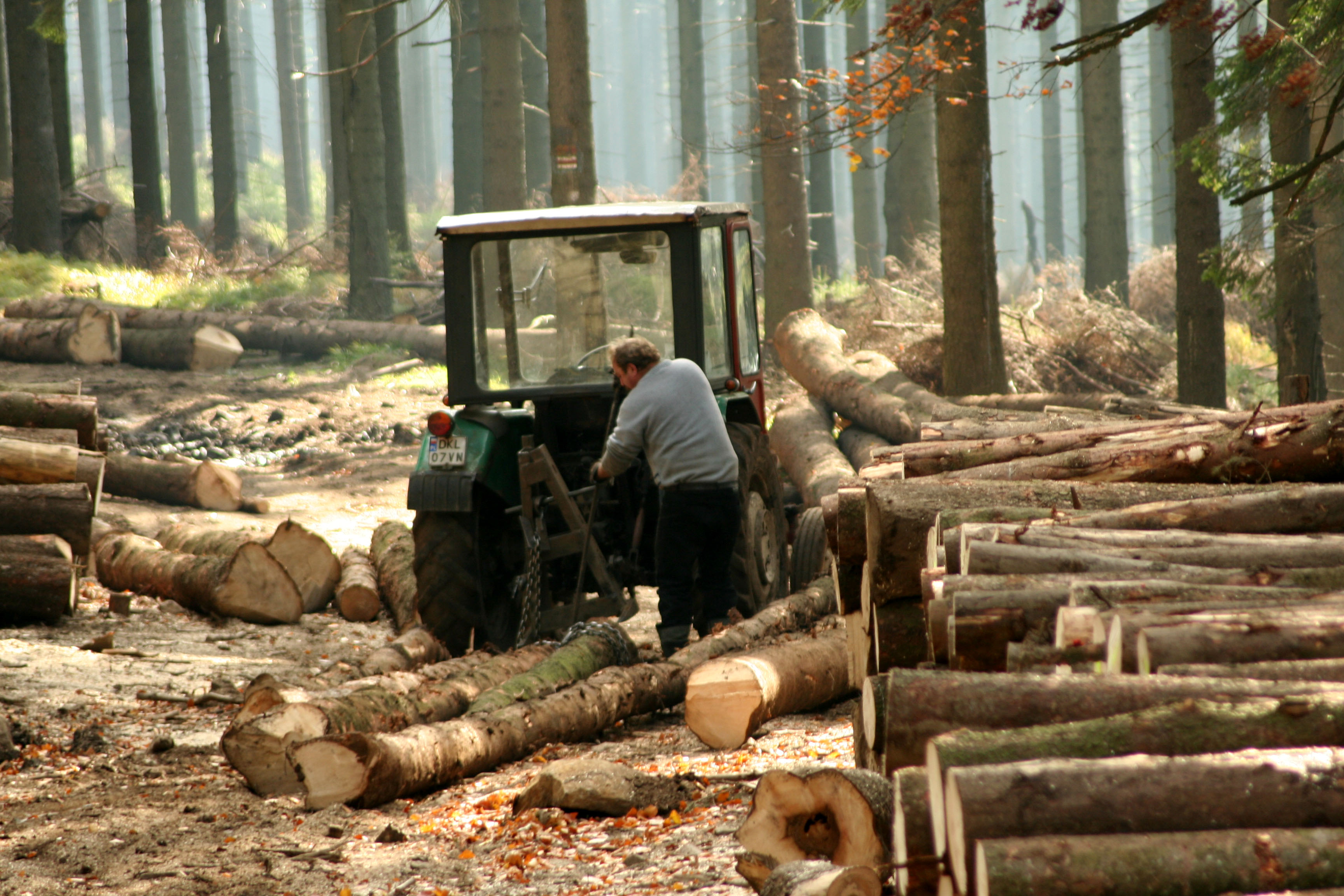
Skidding with a tractor.

In forestry skidding mainly concerned the usual transport of felled timber, sometimes cut to size, to the road, track, river or top of the slope which, from the loader or loading point, enabled it to be transported onwards.

The skidder is someone who does the skidding, often on behalf of the owner or purchasing merchant. In the rural and forestry world, the skidder is often an independent farmer who adapts his wagon and carriage to this type of activity in winter, on behalf of a timber merchant. The itinerant galvachers or bouviers-charretiers of the Morvan region, who rented the pulling power of their ox teams, practiced this trade among other rural services, migrating north and west.

== Forest skidding ==
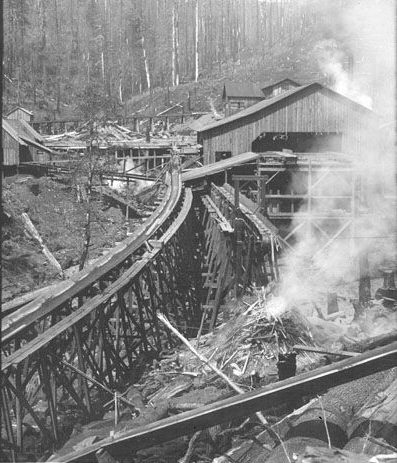
Skidding with a log flume.

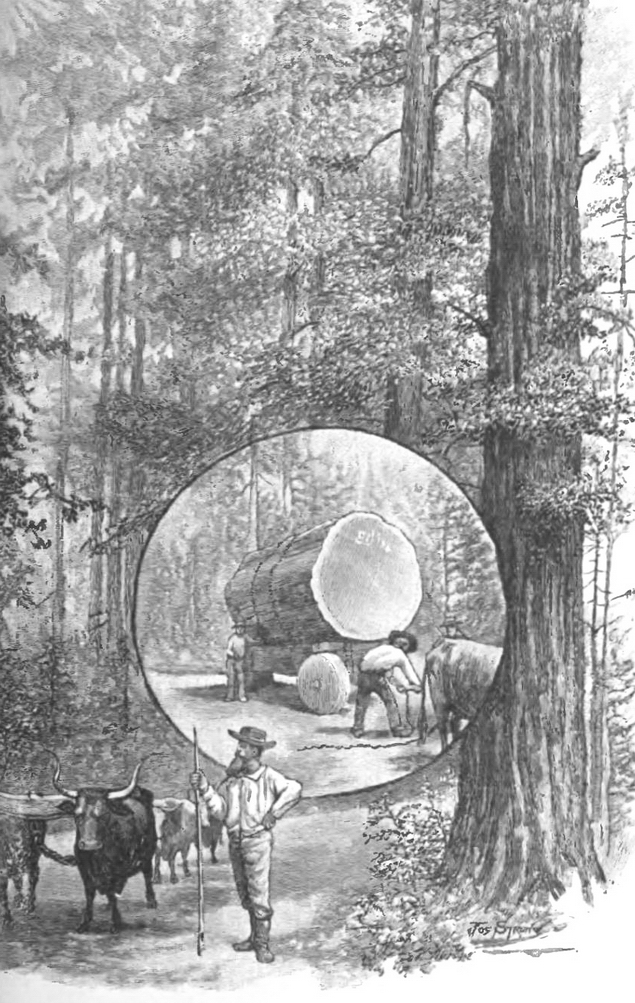
Skidding by oxen, United States, circa 1900.

Forest skidding is based on a multitude of techniques, which are sometimes combined or added to in succession:

Logs can be skidded in several ways, and these are often combined. They can be carried on rows of cross-laid poles or on a triqueballe, a wheeled log carrier. In the past, logs were sometimes thrown down steep slopes along set routes, called lançoirs in French, to reach a valley or river, though this was dangerous. More often, logs are dragged along the ground by draft animals (oxen, horses, buffalo or elephants) or by motorised equipment. They can also be dragged on sledges, using the slope or animal or motorised traction, or pulled on trailers by animals or machines.

Logs can be floated down rivers or across the sea, sometimes under tow, or sent along water channels called flumes. In steep country, logs can be hauled on cables, or lifted out by helicopter, as in the French mountains since 1975. Airships have also been tested several times, but not on a large scale, because the spans are short and changing winds make them unstable.

Skidding by dragging and hauling, then by water, was the most common method until the development of railroads. In the 20th century, this method was often replaced by mechanized skidding in forestry operations, which was sometimes considered to be responsible for considerable soil degradation (compaction affecting roots and the circulation of water and nutrients) and environmental damage (noise, pollution from engines, oils, etc., the need for a dense network of roads and tracks, destruction of country lanes and footpaths, etc.).

Today skidding by animals (horse, buffalo, elephant) is in line with ecological concerns in that it is more respectful of the soil and uses less fuel. Cable logging limit the impact on the soil, but at a slightly higher cost, except in difficult environments (mountain ranges not easily accessible to machines).

=== The specific case of horse skidding ===
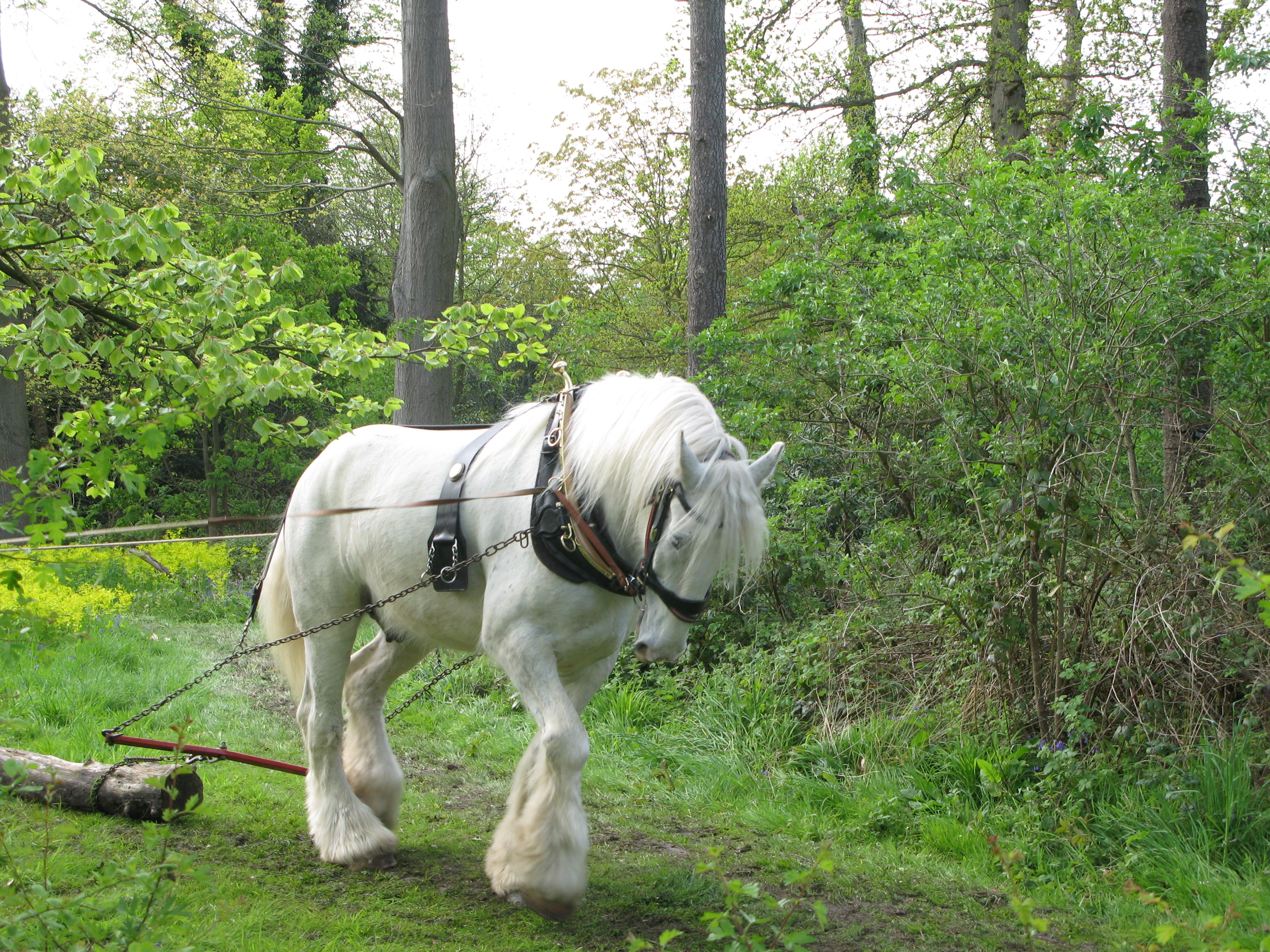
Skidding with a Shire horse.

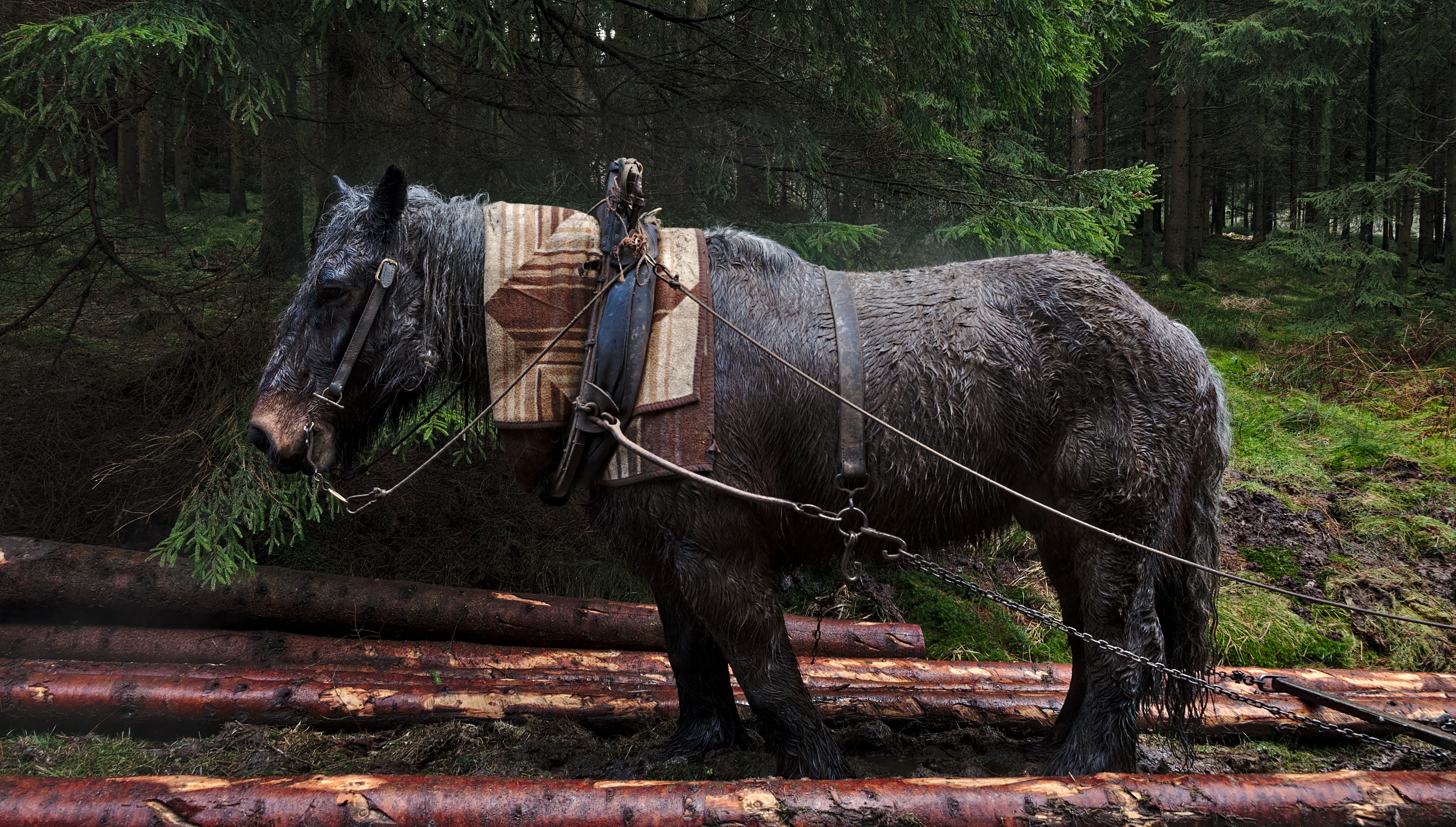
Draft horse used for skidding.

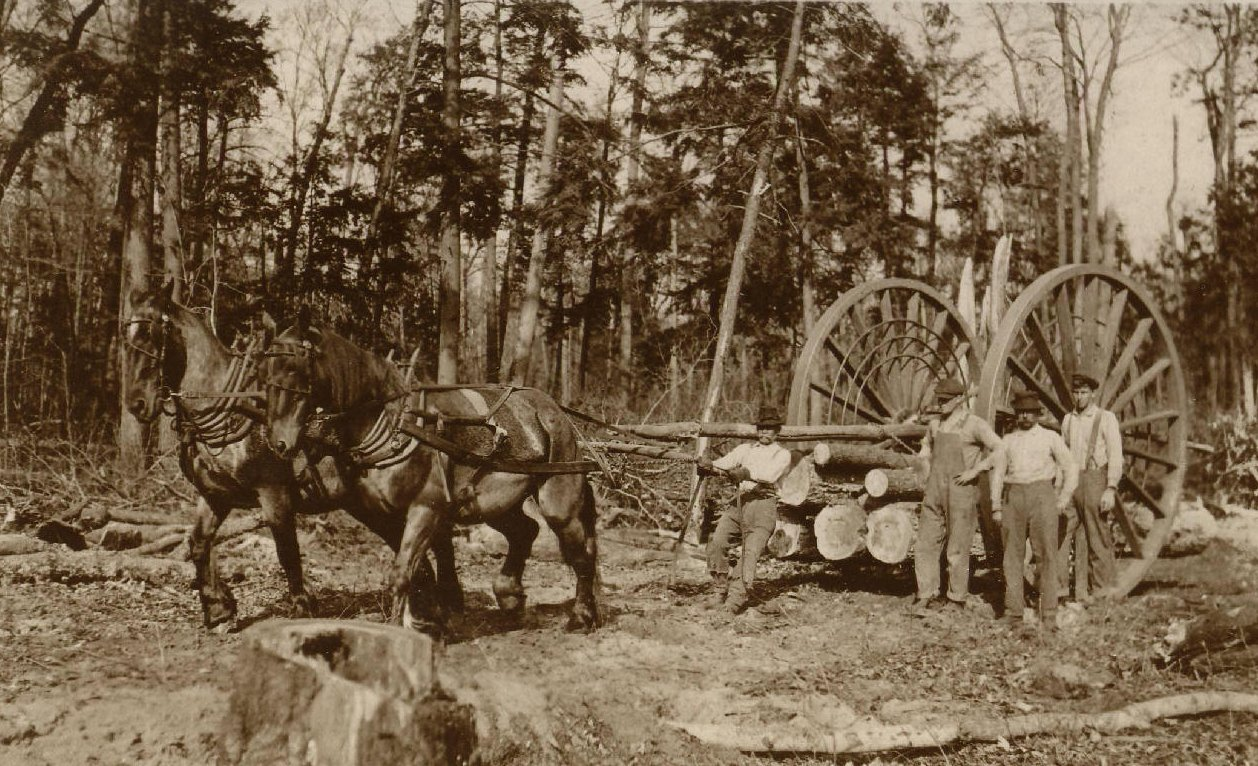
Skidding with a flatbed wagon and large wheels, Michigan, circa 1915.

The use of horses in forestry offers numerous advantages, such as soil protection, absence of pollution, and virtually silent operation. Horses can also be used to welcome the local population. The latter creates a social bond with the sponsors and the public, who are more fascinated by the strength of the horse than by the turbulence of forestry machinery.

However, this working technique requires much more preparation and maintenance time (feeding, cleaning, trimming, etc.). What's more, a horse may also need medical care, which requires considerable outlay. Finally, the use of a horse results in a much more expensive hourly service (around €60/hour).

To work safely the horse must have undergone rigorous training to enable it to work in good conditions. Many service providers prefer to lead their horses with a rope called a "Cordeau", as opposed to long reins called "Guides", which require the use of both hands.

To pull logs the horse is fitted with a harness for forestry/agricultural work (made up of lines), a bridle, a pair of guides (or a rope), a collar on the chest and neck, and a spreader bar to hang the wood with a chain consisting of a choke hook at each end.

The use of draft horses is much sought after by owners of wooded parkland, as without the presence of roads allowing access to forests for forestry machinery, the horse can also work in protected areas or areas with fragile soils and plant species (nature parks, Natura 2000 areas, peat bogs, marshy areas, etc.).

Horses, faster and more maneuverable than the placid and resistant oxen, were very soon appreciated for forest skidding. A powerful, well-trained horse could sometimes accomplish in half a day the task of a pair of oxen harnessed together for a day.

It reduces soil compaction and does not require the creation of new tracks or access roads. Contenting itself with passages less than a metre wide, the horse respects fragile soils and works without engine noise or pollution. The horse's performance varies according to the team, the size and shape of the trees to be pulled and the terrain, and it can pull an average maximum cube (in direct drag) of 1m3, 1.5 for two horses, with maximum efficiency at 0.5m3 for a single horse and 0.7m3 for three horses. Performance rises to 2.5m3 if a triqueballe or foretrain is used. This means an average daily dragged volume over 100 m of 18m3 (for an average cubic distance (DCM) of 0.25m3), 25 m³/day for a DCM of 0.5m3, and 18 m³/day for a DCM of 1m3. For a distance of 200 m, these figures fall to 12, 18 and 12 respectively. On easier terrain, the fardier (or trinqueballe; a horse-drawn machine with 2 braked wheels, a drawbar and a winch) enables 2 or 3 horses to lift and pull logs weighing up to 5,000 kg (3 to 4m^{3}).

The horse is slower on average, but more efficient for skidding on difficult soils, and less costly (24 euros per hour of service versus 32 euros for the farm tractor (taking into account the cost of purchase and use, wage costs and maintenance and travel costs (identical or close). The tractor remains more profitable for skidding outside the forest itself (on tracks). The horse is more expensive per m³ exported, but it is easier to exploit steep slopes (in the downhill direction), and this extra cost is sometimes entirely offset by the lack of need for infrastructure and by the benefits (wood sold at a much higher price) ofeco-labels such as FSC, which are more easily acquired with this type of skidding.

In the Belgian Ardennes (province of Luxembourg), around 90% of the first three clearings in coniferous woodlands are now harvested using horses, which can easily and profitably remove these light woods.

With motorized machines equipped with auxiliary motorized cranes, carts or sleds, daily production varies from simple to double (15 to 30 steres/day) depending on the difficulty of the site. The tractor also imposes compartmentalization, which results in a considerable loss of usable surface area and soil degradation, as well as a marked artificialization of forests.

Unlike the tractor, the horse is just as much at home in regular forests as in planted forests or protected areas (e.g. for grouse), where it is particularly appreciated. It is also appreciated in cases where the owner applies for an "ecological" forest management label or certification (FSC, for example). It is also effective in assisting the work of river wardens in removing log jams and macro-waste, and in restoring riparian forest.

=== Winter skidding ===
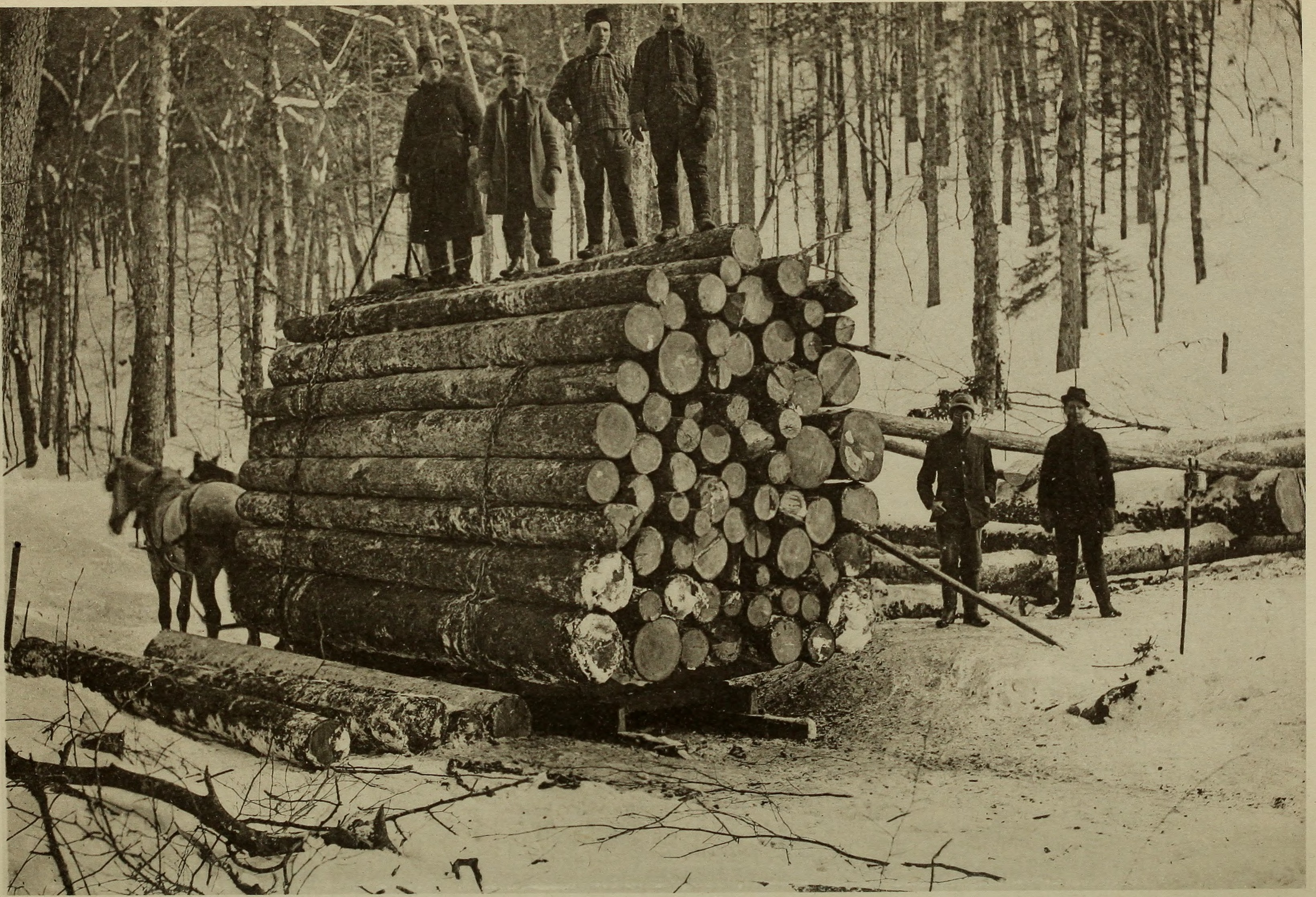
Skidding on frozen ground.

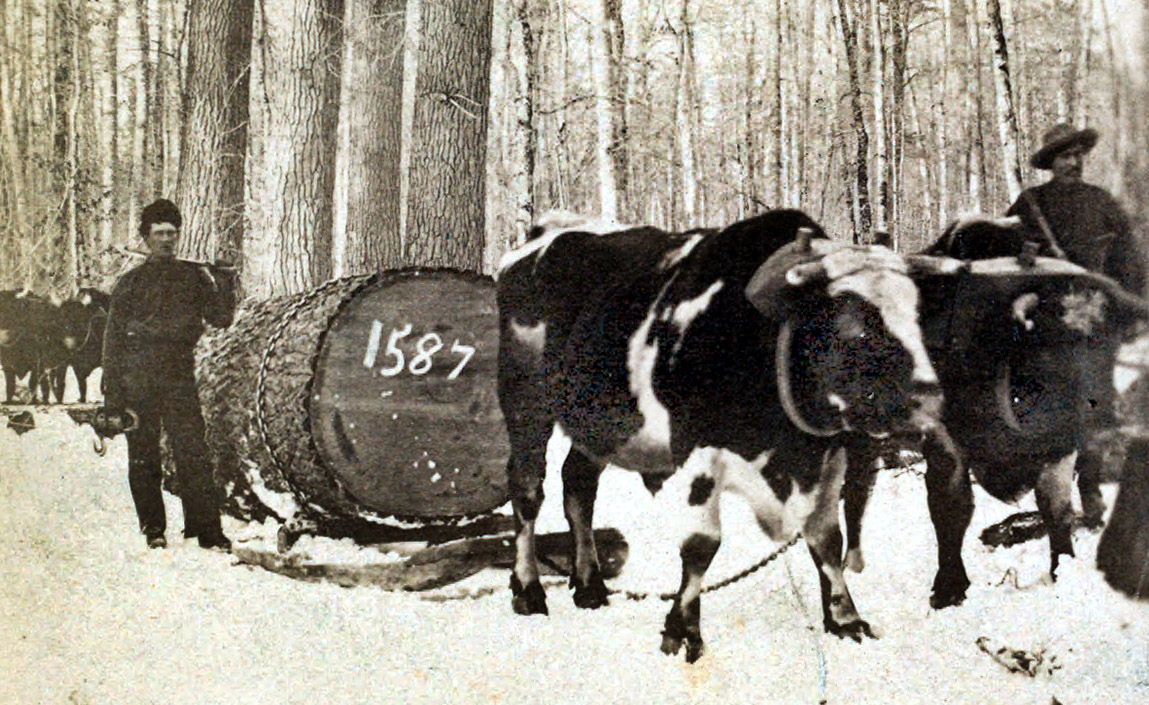
In winter, two oxen were enough to pull a large log on a sled.

For a long time, harvesting in winter was the preferred option for a variety of reasons. Skidding to rivers was often done in winter on frozen ground. Floating was established in spring, when rivers were swollen withmeltwater, and in summer. This was true in Quebec in the early 20th century: around 1930, the first trucks appeared on building sites, and by 1950, lumber was being trucked on expanding road networks; floating was gradually abandoned; finally, all-season timber harvesting and transportation operations appeared in the decades that followed; winter harvesting and transportation activities remained, almost exclusively concentrated in areas such as thin, hydromorphic soils with low bearing capacity, etc. Timber harvesting in Quebec is now often carried out in summer, with autumn spent building winter roads, and transportation taking place when the structure is sufficiently frozen, at the end of November. Frost can multiply soil bearing capacity by a factor of 8 or 10.

== See also ==
- Horse-drawn vehicle – Vehicle pulled by one or more horses
- Silviculture – Practice of controlling forests for timber production
- High forest – Type of forest consisting of large, tall mature trees with a closed canopy
- Selection cutting – Forestry practice
- Forest Stewardship Council – Global forest certification system
- Forestry law – Field of law

== Bibliography ==
- Kahn, Axel. Pensées en chemin, Ma France des Ardennes au Pays basque (in French). Stock 2014. ISBN 978-2-234-07010-3.
- Food & Agriculture Organisation. Chapitre 5 - Débardage.
- Boithias, Jean-Louis; Brignon, Marc (1985). Les scieurs et les anciens sagards des Vosges, bûcherons, schlitteurs, voituriers et voileurs (in French). Édition Créer.
- Dugast, Jean-Léo (2008). Forces de la nature : chevaux & débardeurs des forêts de France (in French). Éd. de l'Étrave. ISBN 978-2-909599-87-8.
