= Cable logging =

Logging method

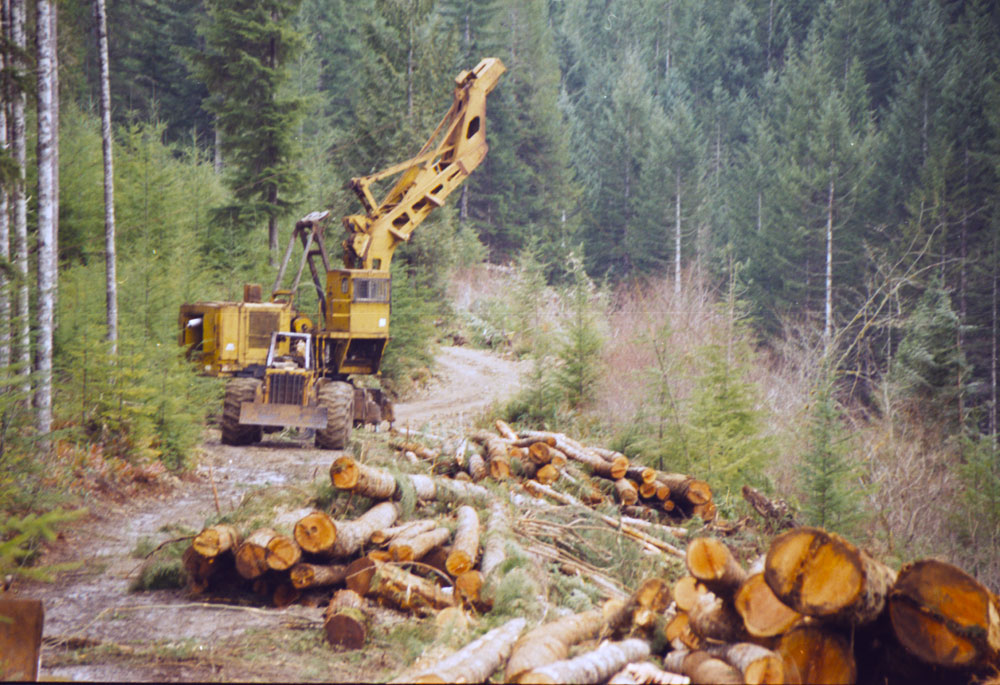
High Lead logging in Western Oregon

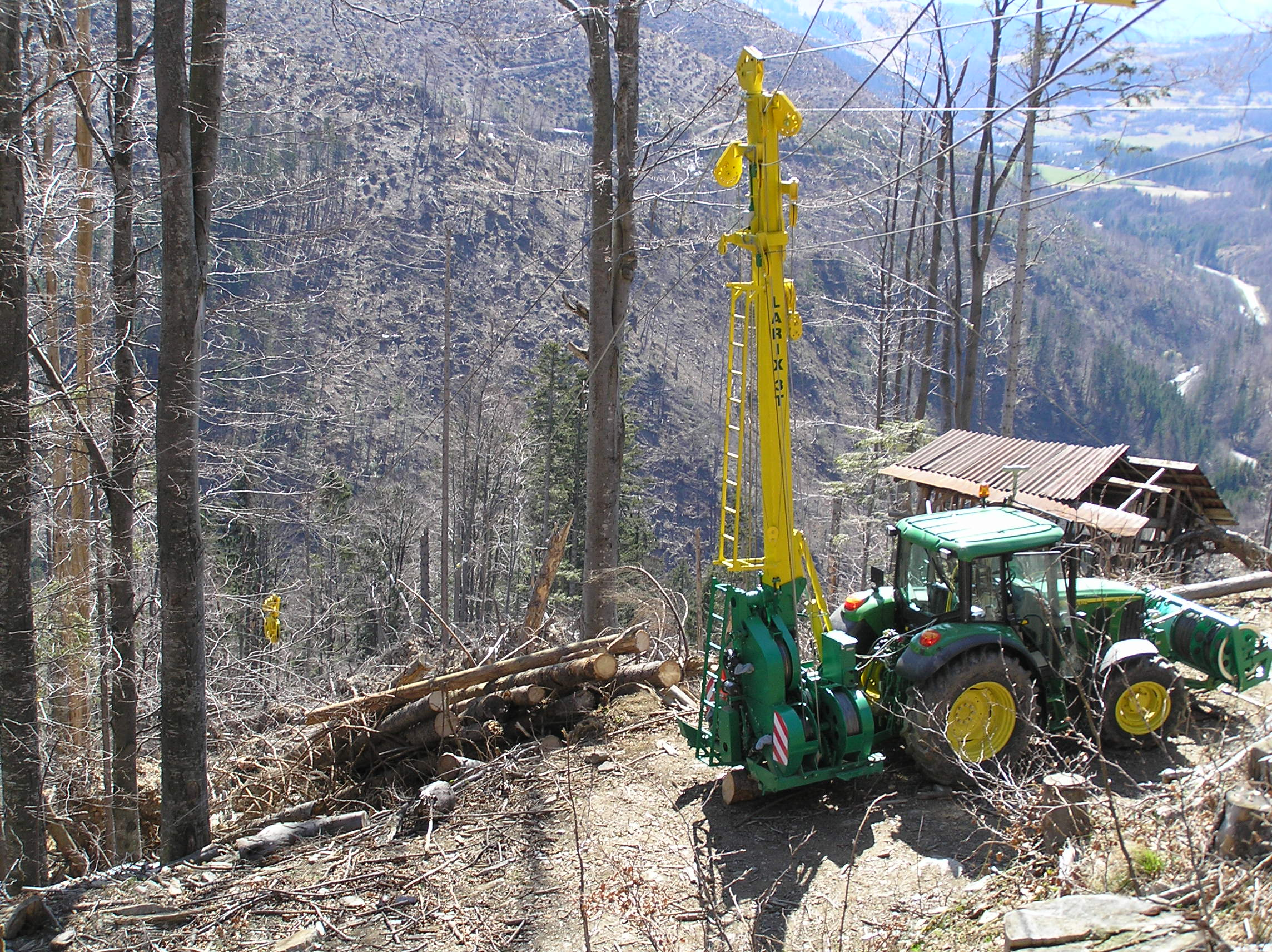
Cable grue Larix 3T, installed on agricultural tractor

Cable logging is a logging method primarily used on the West Coast of North America with yarder, loaders, and grapple yarders, but also in Europe (Austria, Switzerland, Czech Republic, France, Italy).

== Classes ==
The cables can be rigged in several configurations, of which two are common.

=== High lead ===
High lead logging, in which a simple loop of cable runs from the yarder out through pulley blocks anchored to stumps at the far end of the cut. It uses a spar, yarder and loader. It was developed by Oscar Wirkkala. It is accomplished with two lines (cables) and two winches (or cable drums). The mainline or yarding line extends out from one winch, while a second usually lighter line called the haulback line extends out from the other winch to a 'tail block' or pulley at the tail (back) end of the logging site, and passes through the tail block and connects to the main line. Butt rigging is installed where the two lines join and the logs are hooked to the butt rigging with chokers. The procedure is to wind up the main line and the logs are pulled in, wind up the haulback and the butt rigging is pulled out for more logs or another 'turn'.

The "high lead" feature is added by elevating both lines near the winch or 'head' end. This is accomplished by running the lines through a block (pulley) called the "head block" because it is on the head end of the project. Early on, it was customary to trim and top a tree making it into a 'spar pole' or 'spar tree' for the purpose of supporting the head blocks but gradually the use of wooden spars gave way over the 20th century to the use of steel spars stood up for the purpose. In any event the spars are supported by a number of guy wires.

The reason for elevating the lines (cables) at the head end is to assist in pulling the logs free of obstructions on the ground. Also if the trees are being partially lifted as they are transported it is less disruptive to the ground which can be an environmental issue. High lead is a popular method of logging on the West Coast of America. It was first used in 1904, with Lidgerwood winches, and a spar tree.

=== Skyline ===
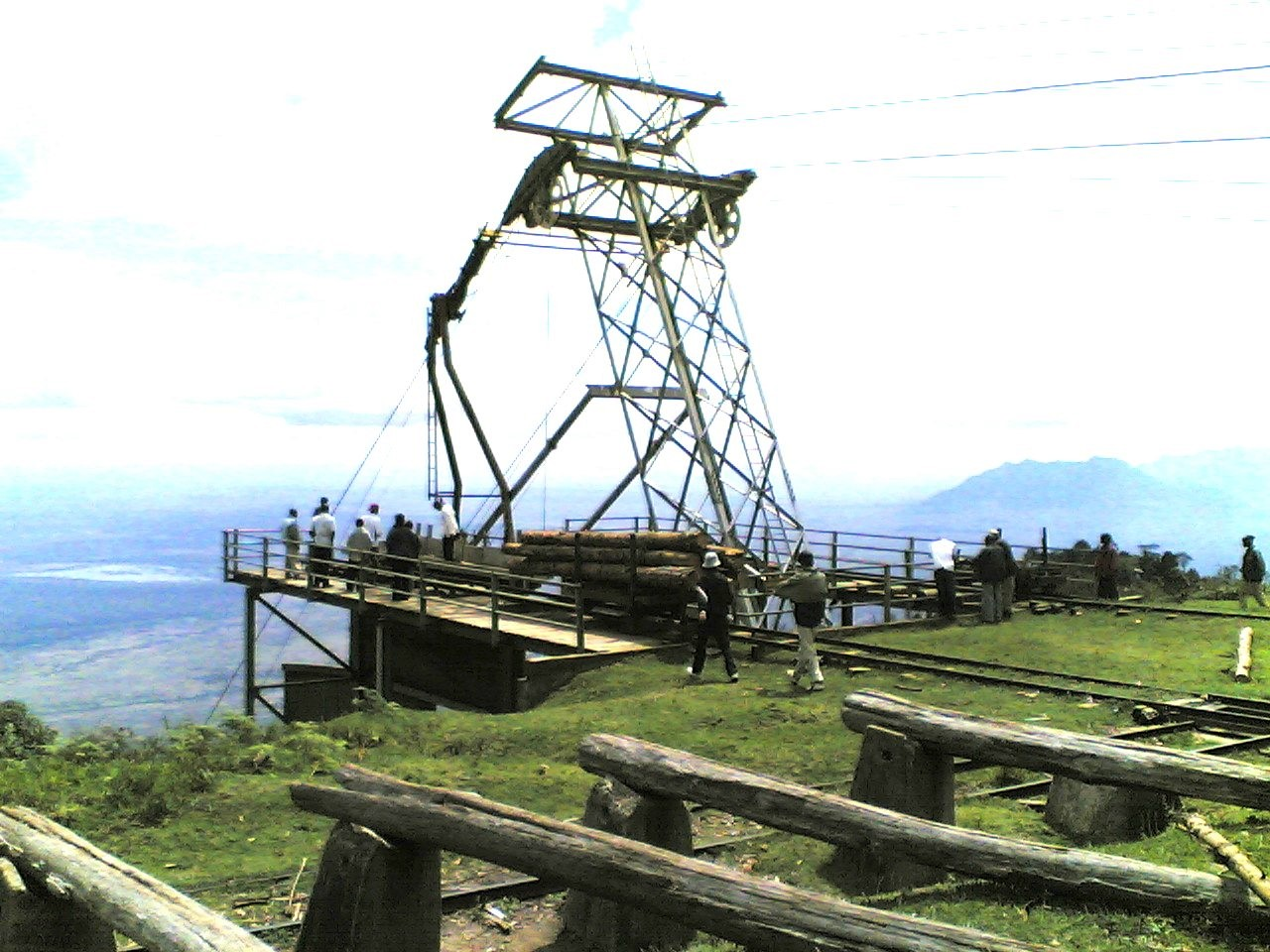
Cable Yarding System in Lushoto, Tanzania

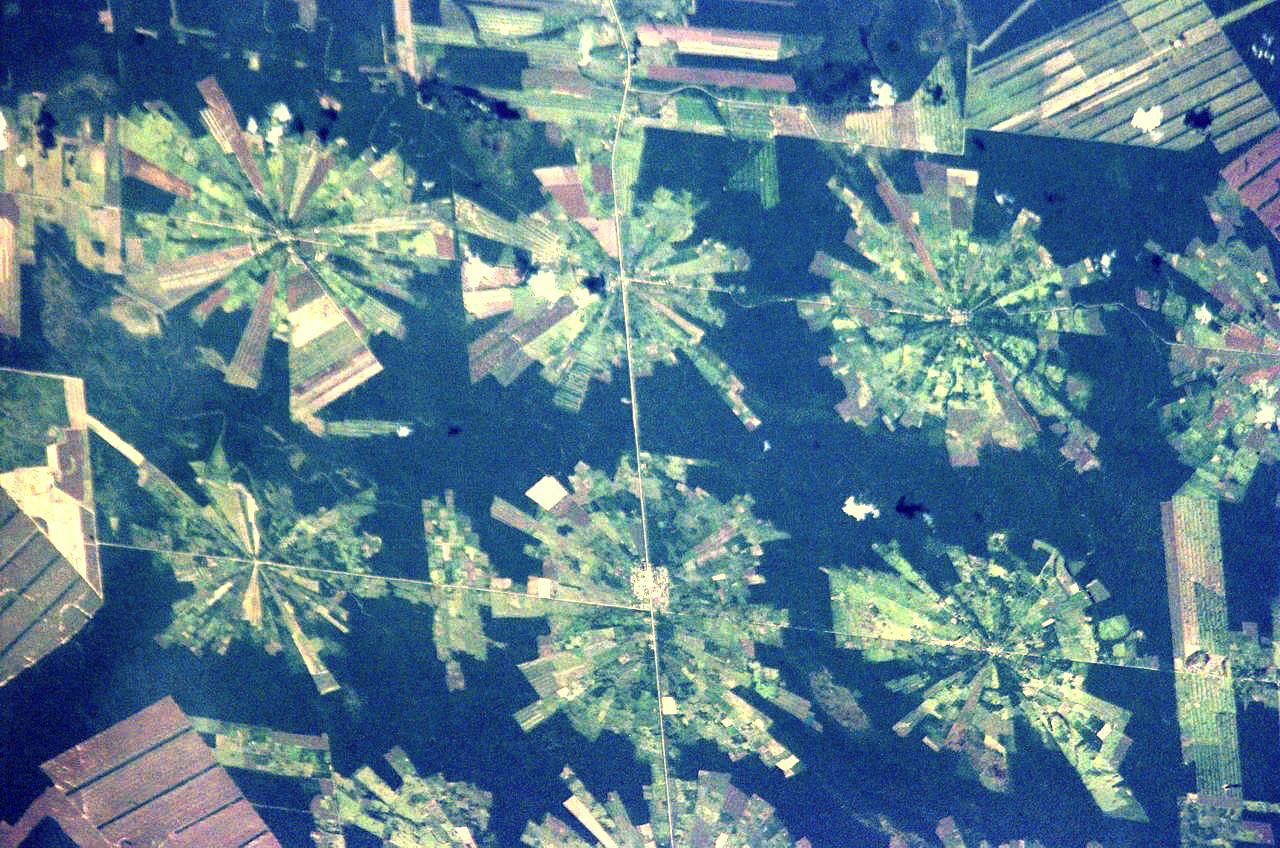
Satellite photograph of industrial-scale skyline logging in the Tierras Bajas project in eastern Bolivia, showing deforestation and its later associated replacement by agriculture

Skyline logging (or skyline yarding), in which a carriage, pulled by hauling cables, runs along a skyline cable (a cableway or "highline"), providing vertical lift to the logs. Harvested logs are transported on a suspended steel cable from where the trees are felled to a central processing location. The skyline's cable loop runs around a drive pulley, generally at the central delivery end, and the return pulley at the collection end; the collection-end pulley may be moved radially to other locations within the constraints of the system and may operate over large areas. Individual logs are attached to the suspended cable by means of choker cables and carriages. A skyline yarder can pull in 5 to 10 logs at a time, using separate chokers. The pulleys are mounted on towers or cranes, other trees, ridges, or, in rare cases, helium balloons.

== Comparison ==
While skyline logging requires additional setup, the vertical lift of the skyline allows faster yarding, which can outweigh the additional labor costs, especially on larger harvest units.

Since the 1980s grapple yarders have become popular.

Skyline and grapple yarding, however, require more complex, and expensive equipment. A traditional high lead or gravity system will function with just two cables, a skidding line. As the names imply the skidding line is used to drag the logs in, and the haulback line is used to drag the skidding line back out for the next turn (or group of logs).

A skyline system will add a third line---the skyline whose function is to hold the skidding line and the haulback line off the ground or 'in the sky'.

The yarder itself is located on a landing, a flat area on top of the ridge that is being logged. After the trees are retrieved by the yarder, the limbs are bucked (removed) and the logs are then placed in piles awaiting transport.

== Manufacturers ==
- Valentini, Italy
- Greifenberg, Italy
- Cable grue Larix, Czech Republic
- Mayr Melnhof ForestTechnik, Austria
- Madill, Sidney, British Columbia

== See also ==
- Washington Iron Works Skidder
- Swing yarder
- Skidding (forestry)
- Ax Men
- Skyline logging
