= Yarder =

Forestry equipment for moving logs

A yarder is piece of logging equipment that uses a system of cables to pull or fly logs from the stump to a collection point. It generally consists of an engine, drums, and spar, but has a range of configurations and variations, such as the swing yarder and grapple yarder.

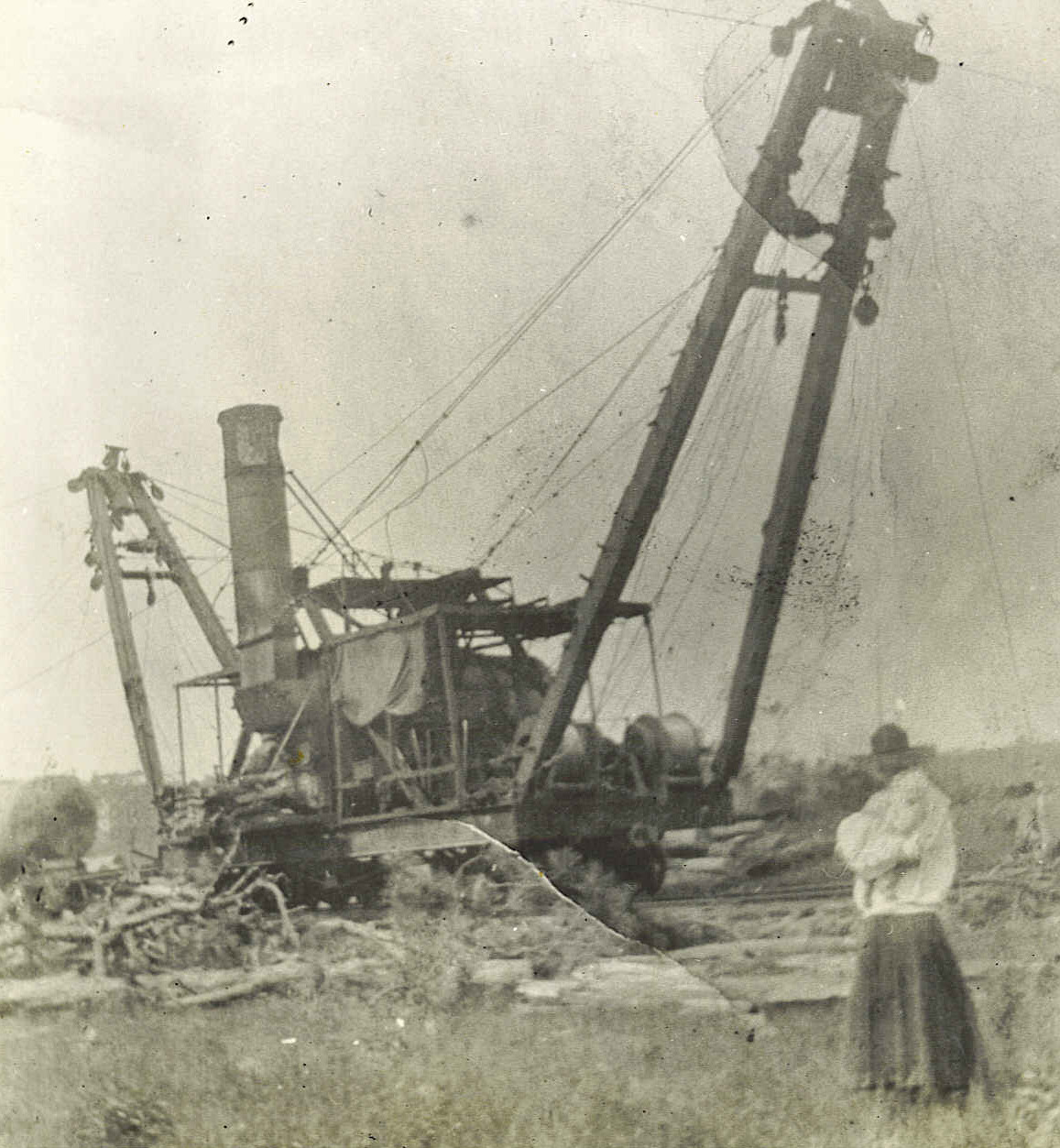
Clyde Skidder at Marathon Logging Camp near Newton, MS ~1921

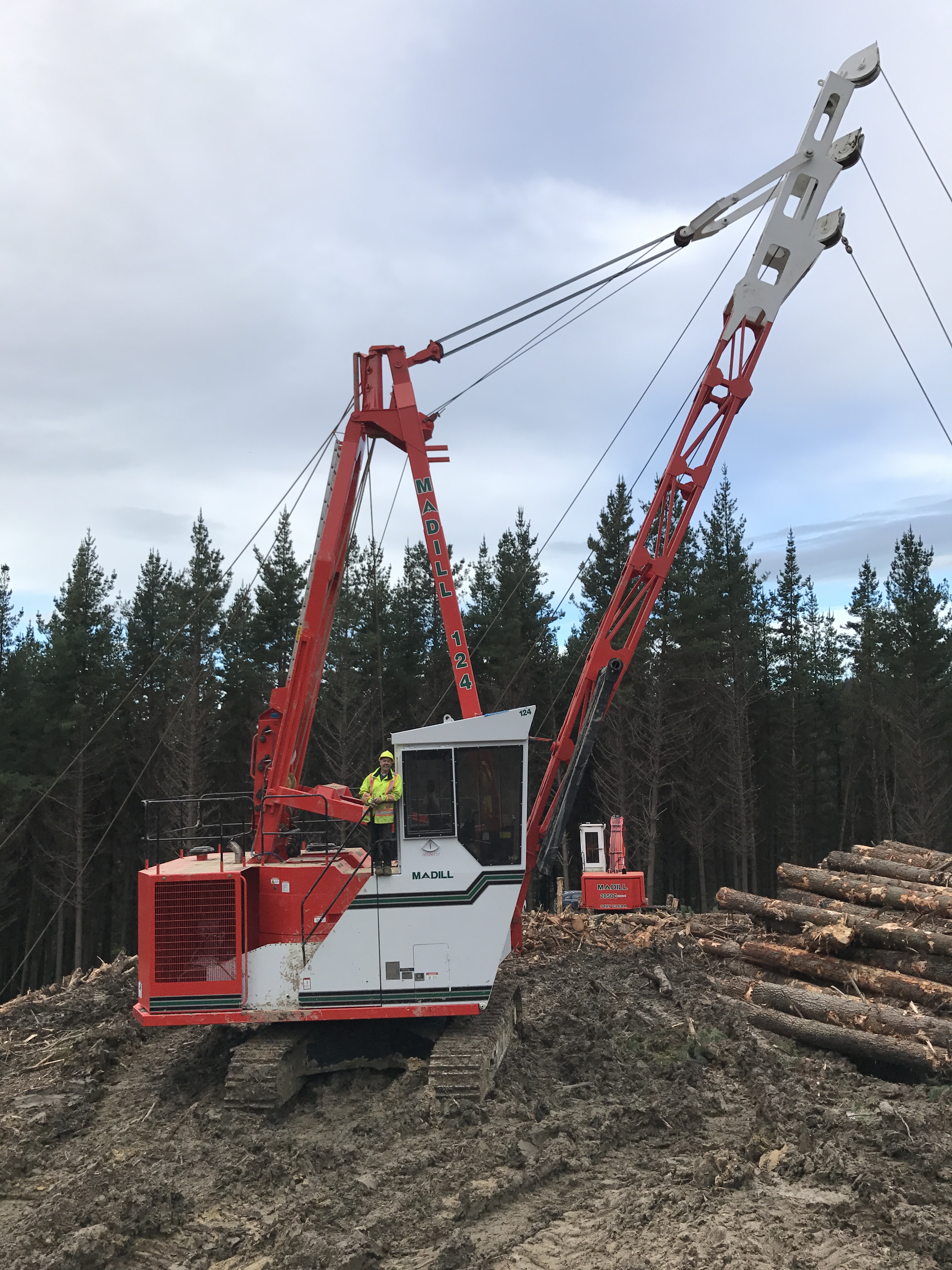
Madill 124 Yarder. An example of modern yarders still being used in logging industry.

== Early yarders ==
The early yarders were steam powered. They traveled on railroads, known as "dummylines", and felled trees were dragged or "skidded" to the railroad where they were loaded onto rail cars.

Popular brands included Willamette, Skagit, Washington, Tyee, or Lidgerwood and Clyde, built by Clyde Ironworks in Duluth, Minnesota. The company was formally Northwestern Manufacturing and was changed to Clyde Ironworks in 1901. Although these machines appear to be large and cumbersome, they were highly productive. The Clyde was capable of retrieving logs from four different points at the same time. Each cable, or lead, was approximately 1,000 feet (300 m) in length. Reportedly comparable to the Clyde, the Clearwater yarder, designed for mobile truck mounting, hauled logs at up to 800 feet (240 m) at 1,000 feet (300 m) per minute.

== Modern cable logging ==
Cable logging, used primarily on the North American west coast, uses a yarder, loaders and grapple yarders.

== Swing yarder ==
A swing yarder is a mobile piece of heavy-duty forestry equipment used for pulling logs from the woods to a logging road with cables. The swing yarder is also known as a grapple yarder.

In any logging operation, it is necessary to transport the harvested tree from the stump to a landing for transport to market (usually on a truck). If the ground is relatively flat, it may be possible to transport the tree or logs cut from the tree on a wheeled or tracked machine. However, if the ground is too steep for the operation of such machinery, it is common practice to rig a cable system for moving the wood. The swing yarder could be used for this purpose.

Cable yarding was first used in the Redwood forest in 1881 using manila rope. Wire rope was invented in 1883. The swing yarder has several drums to pull in the cables. The cables run up an angled boom and then to the far side of a setting. By using two cables set up like a clothesline, the rigging can be pulled out, and logs can be pulled across a log trail or corridor where the trees have been previously felled. This machine is most suitable for steep ground where it is difficult to access the logs with other machinery, often a 30-40% incline. Swing yarders can also be used in flatter areas with lighter loads.

While there are various rigging options, the most common one uses a grapple that can be lowered onto a log and closed via the cable system. Using a grapple avoids the need for people in the setting to attach chokers to the log. Choker setting, as a profession, is a dangerous occupation.

The main difference between a swing yarder and a tower yarder is that the upperworks is mounted on a large slewing bearing. This bearing permits the boom and cable system to be swung across a setting without relocating the machine. An experienced operator uses timing and cable tension to swing the grapple to the desired location. In practice, however, the main benefit of a swinging machine is that once the logs are yarded up to the machine, they can be swung to the side and landed. This allows the machine to be positioned in a small area, such as on a road, and to land (set down) the logs on the road behind (or in front of) the machine. By contrast a tower has no options on where to set the logs---so the tower has to be positioned back from the break of the hill to leave a landing area on the downhill side of the machine, the logs can only be pulled up to near the tower and then lowered to the ground making it necessary for a shovel (log loader) to also be present to remove the logs once landed. A swing machine does not need to be as tall as a tower yarder, particularly on steep ground. It can be set up to the 'edge' of a hill, while the tower yarder must be set back from the edge to allow landing space.

== See also ==
- Steam donkey – a similar, smaller logging machine
- Washington Iron Works Skidder
