= Lidgerwood =

American industrial company

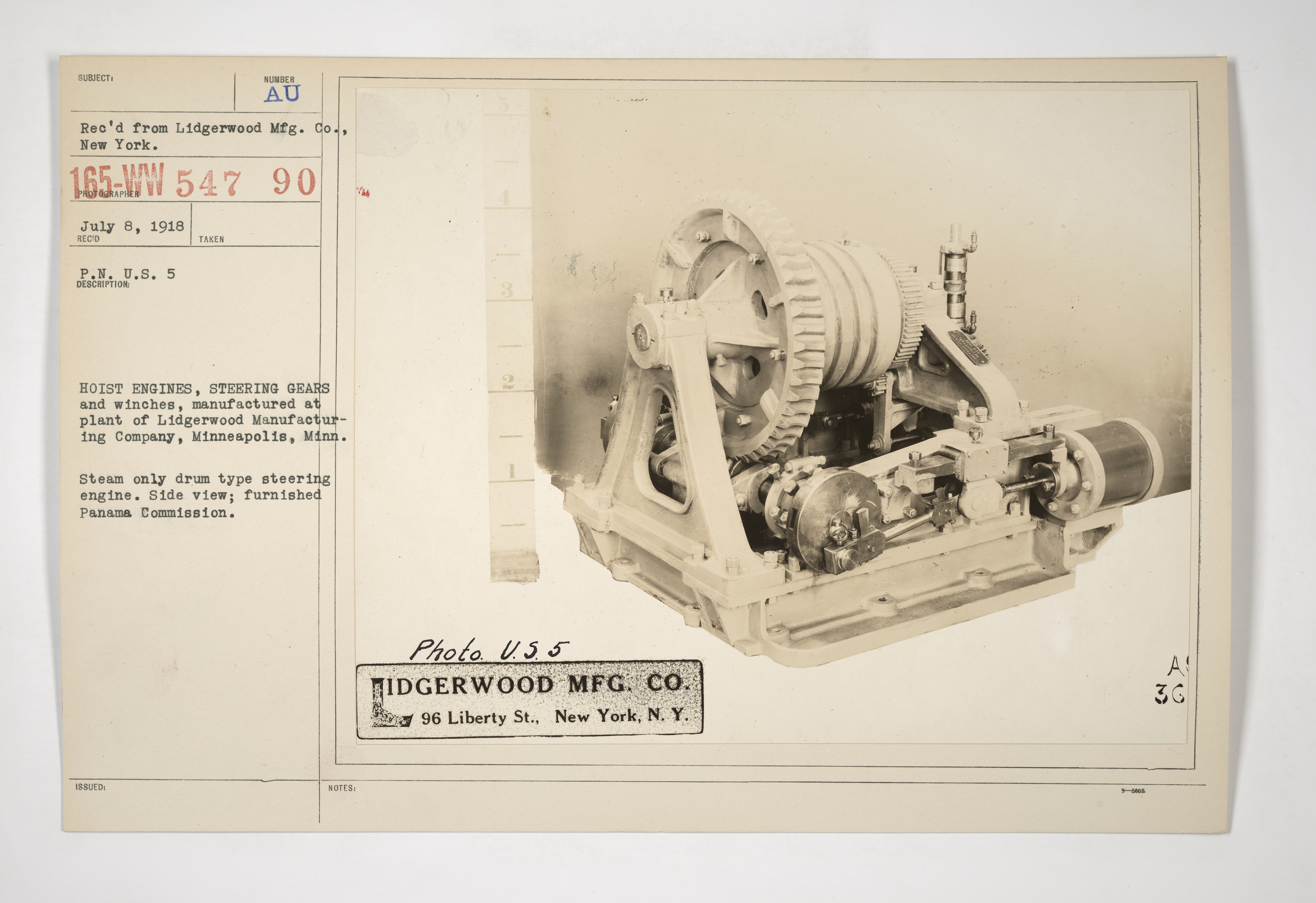
Lidgerwood steering engine

Lidgerwood Manufacturing Company was an American company that made boilers, winches, scrapers, hoists and cranes. Lidgerwood equipment was used on construction of the Panama Canal. They later built logging yarders and aerial tramways, cable cars or ropeways.

== Products ==
Lidgerwood winches had at least two specific railroad maintenance uses, and were used by railroad customers to move railroad freight cars into position for loading and unloading (and to move other cars out of the way). As the successor company is still in business it is probable that they continue to be used in the railroad industry for moving cars through current (2013) times.

Railroad wheels need to have a specific profile. As the profile wears into degraded shapes their performance becomes irregular and eventually unsafe. Most wheels are re-profiled using some variation of a wheel lathe or milling machine; but it is impractical to position steam locomotives over a lathe or to remove the wheels for re-profiling (although shop lathes do re-profile dis-mounted drive wheels when the locomotive is already disassembled). Instead, a winch – known colloquially as "The Lidgerwood" on some railroads – would move the locomotive while cutting heads were mounted on brake shoe brackets and forced against the wheels. As the locomotive moved against the cutting heads, its wheels were cut back to a desirable profile. In a locomotive maintenance facility of the steam engine era (until, generally, the mid-1950s in the US) the place where this was done was sometimes known as the "Lidgerwood Track".

Maintenance of a railroad embankment may require material (soil, rock, etc.) to be moved from where it is deposited by erosion near the track to a place where the embankment has been eroded away, or a railroad may need to simply widen the cut and fill sections. One method to do this was to mount a winch on one flat car (colloquially known as the Lidgerwood Car and in some cases labeled as such) with a line connected to a plow that was configured to slide along the decks of many flat cars. Soil material was shoveled (manually or by power equipment) onto the flat cars then the train of flat cars was moved to where the material was to be unloaded and the plow was pulled over the decks, forcing the material laterally off the flat cars where it fell to the embankment.
