= Logging =

Process of cutting, processing, and moving trees

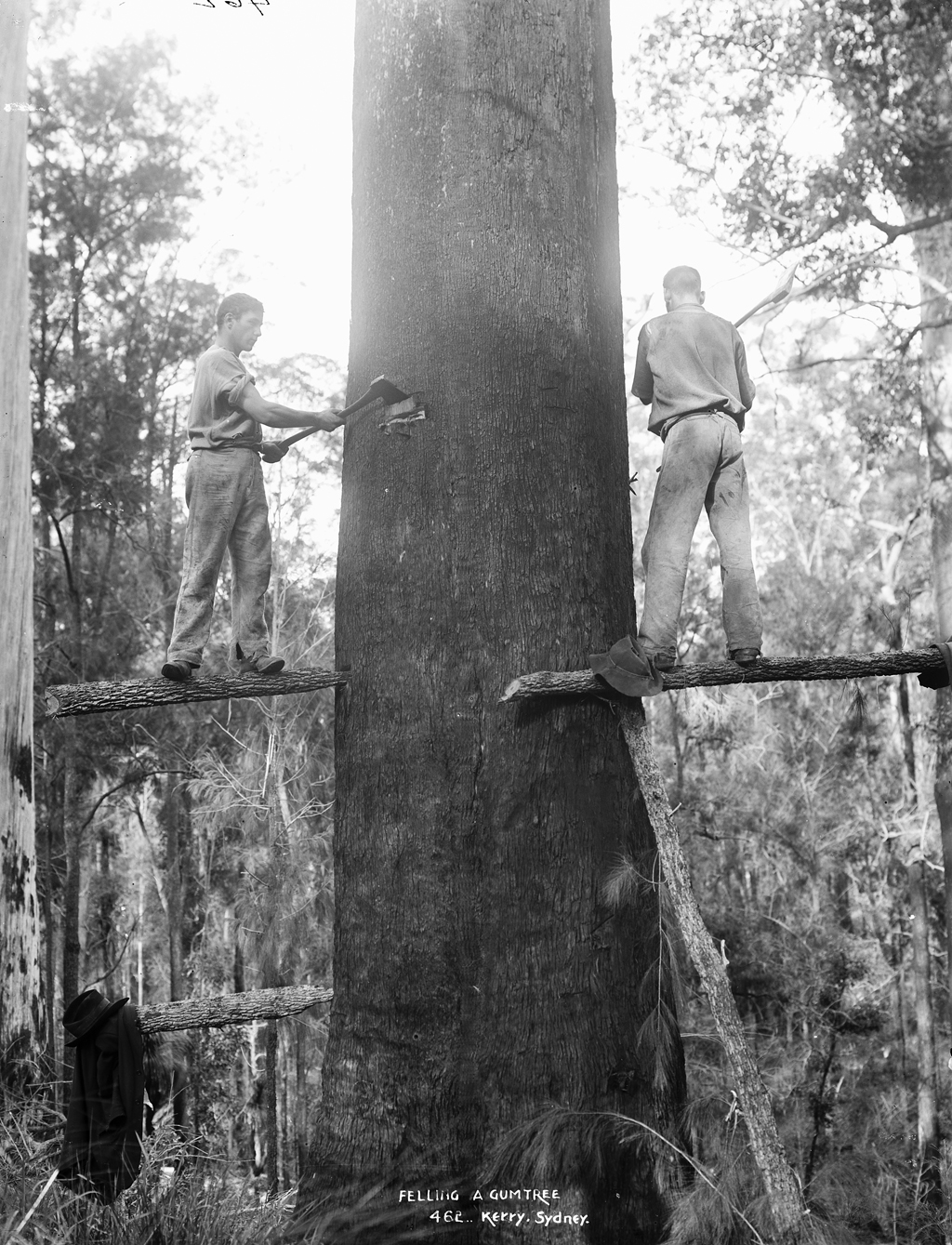
A Eucalyptus (Eucalyptus) being felled using springboards, c. 1884–1917, Australia

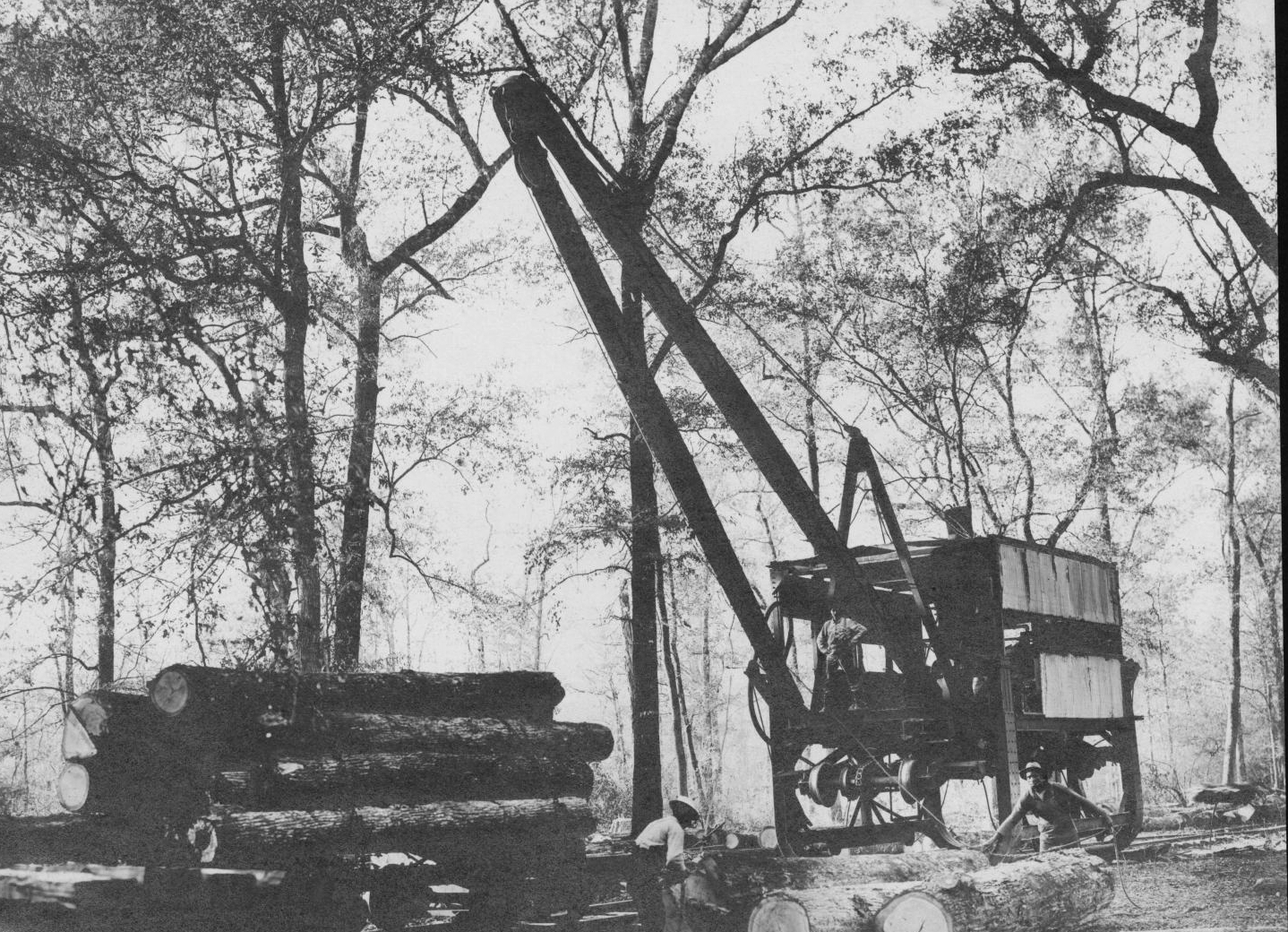
McGiffert Log Loader in East Texas, US, c. 1907

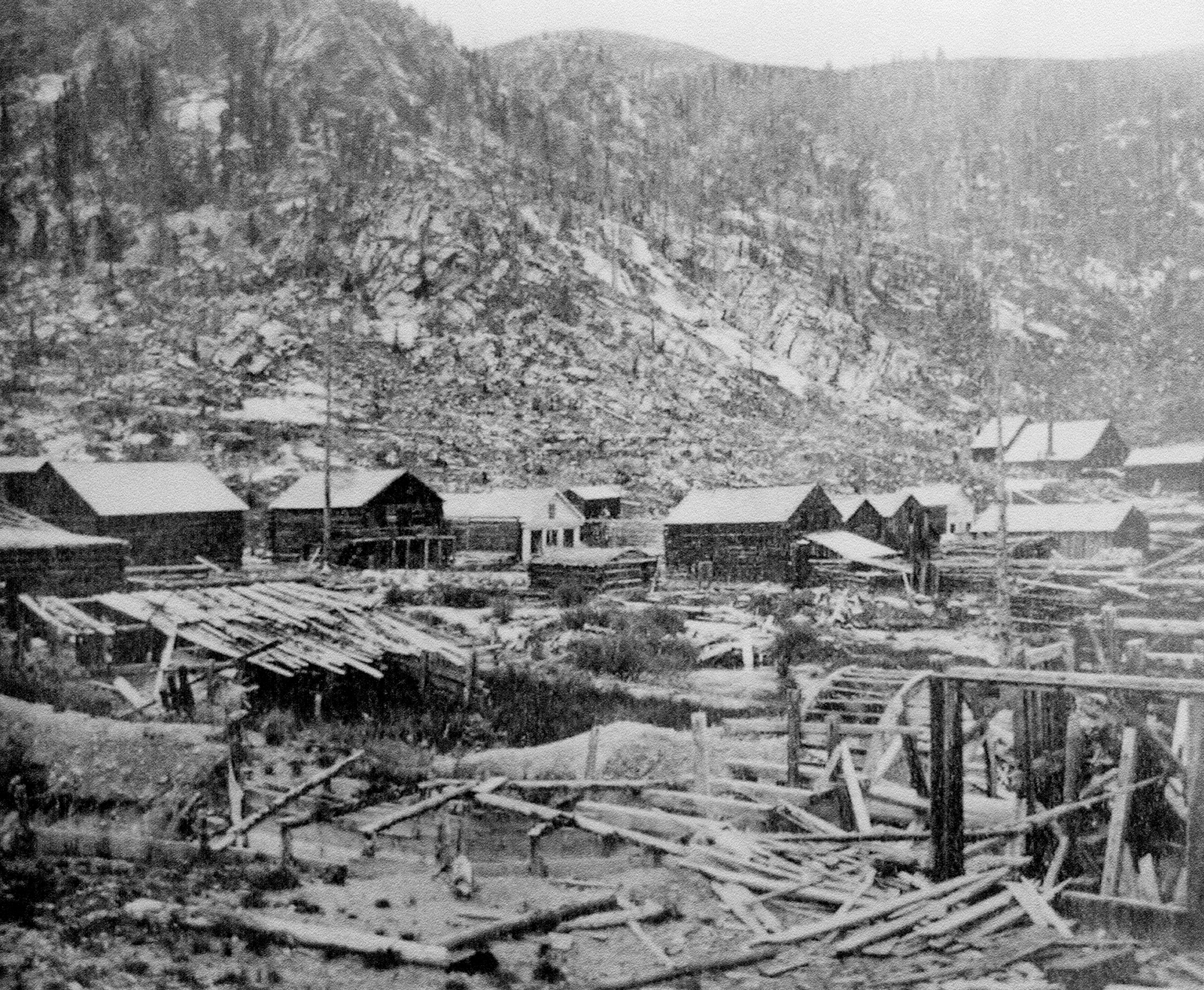
Lumber under snow in Montgomery, Colorado, 1880s

Logging is the process of cutting, processing, and moving trees to a location for transport. It may include skidding, on-site processing, and loading of trees or logs onto trucks or skeleton cars. In forestry, the term logging is sometimes used narrowly to describe the logistics of moving wood from the stump to somewhere outside the forest, usually a sawmill or a lumber yard. In common usage, however, the term may cover a range of forestry or silviculture activities.

Logging is the beginning of a supply chain that provides raw material for many products societies worldwide use for housing, construction, energy, and consumer paper products. Logging systems are also used as a source of biomass, to manage forests, reduce the risk of wildfires, and restore ecosystem functions, though their efficiency for these purposes has been challenged.

Logging frequently has negative impacts. The harvesting procedure itself may be illegal, including the use of corrupt means to gain access to forests; extraction without permission or from a protected area; the cutting of protected species; or the extraction of timber in excess of agreed limits. It may involve the so-called "timber mafia". Excess logging can lead to irreparable harm to ecosystems, such as deforestation and biodiversity loss. Infrastructure for logging can also lead to other environmental degradation. These negative environmental impacts can lead to environmental conflict. Additionally, there is significant occupational injury risk involved in logging.

Logging can take many formats. Clearcutting (or "block cutting") is not necessarily considered a type of logging but a harvesting or silviculture method. Cutting trees with the highest value and leaving those with lower value, often diseased or malformed trees, is referred to as high grading. It is sometimes called selective logging, and confused with selection cutting, the practice of managing stands by harvesting a proportion of trees. Logging usually refers to above-ground forestry logging. Submerged forests exist on land that has been flooded by damming to create reservoirs. Harvesting trees from forests submerged by flooding or dam creation is called underwater logging, a form of timber recovery.

== Clearcutting ==
Clearing 150,000 trees at Cwmcarn Forest, Ebbw Valle, Wales

Clearcutting, or clearfelling, is a method of harvesting that removes essentially all the standing trees in a selected area. Depending on management objectives, a clearcut may or may not have reserve trees left to attain goals other than regeneration, including wildlife habitat management, mitigation of potential erosion or water quality concerns. Silviculture objectives for clearcutting, (for example, healthy regeneration of new trees on the site) and a focus on forestry distinguish it from deforestation. Other methods include shelterwood cutting, group selective, single selective, seed-tree cutting, patch cut, and retention cutting.

== Other logging methods ==
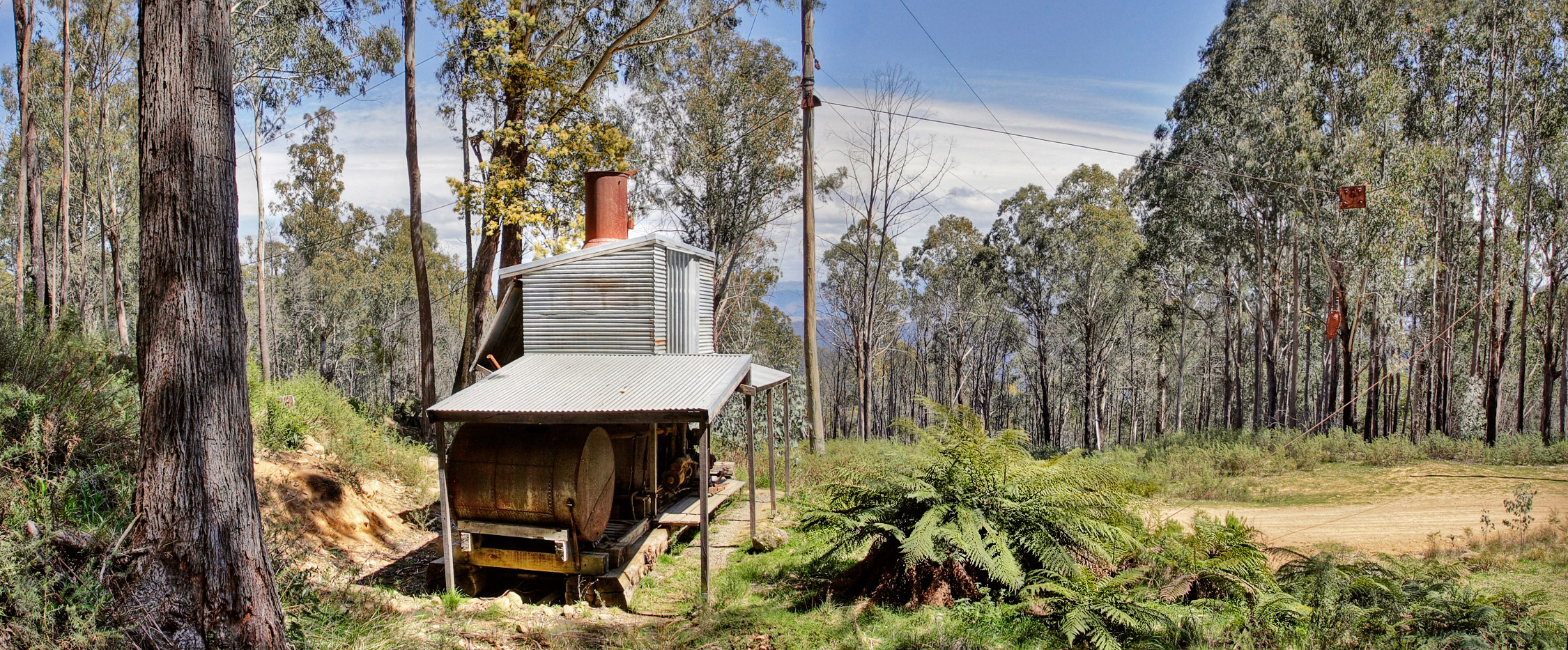
The Washington Iron Works Skidder in Nuniong is the only one of its kind in Australia, with donkey engine, spars, and cables still rigged for work.

The above operations can be carried out by different methods, of which the following three are considered industrial methods:

=== Tree-length logging / stem-only harvesting ===
Trees are felled and then delimbed and topped at the stump. The log is then transported to the landing, where it is bucked and loaded on a truck. This leaves the slash (and the nutrients it contains) in the cut area, where it must be further treated if wild land fires are of concern.

=== Whole-tree logging ===
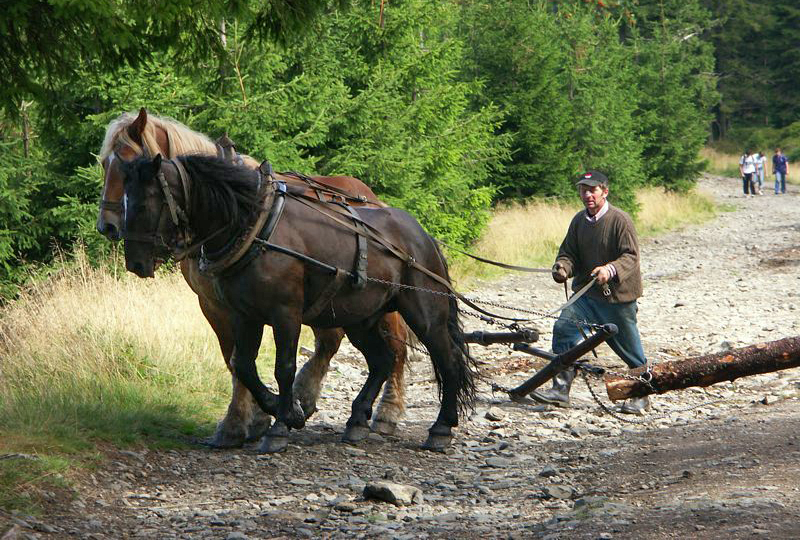
Horse logging in Poland

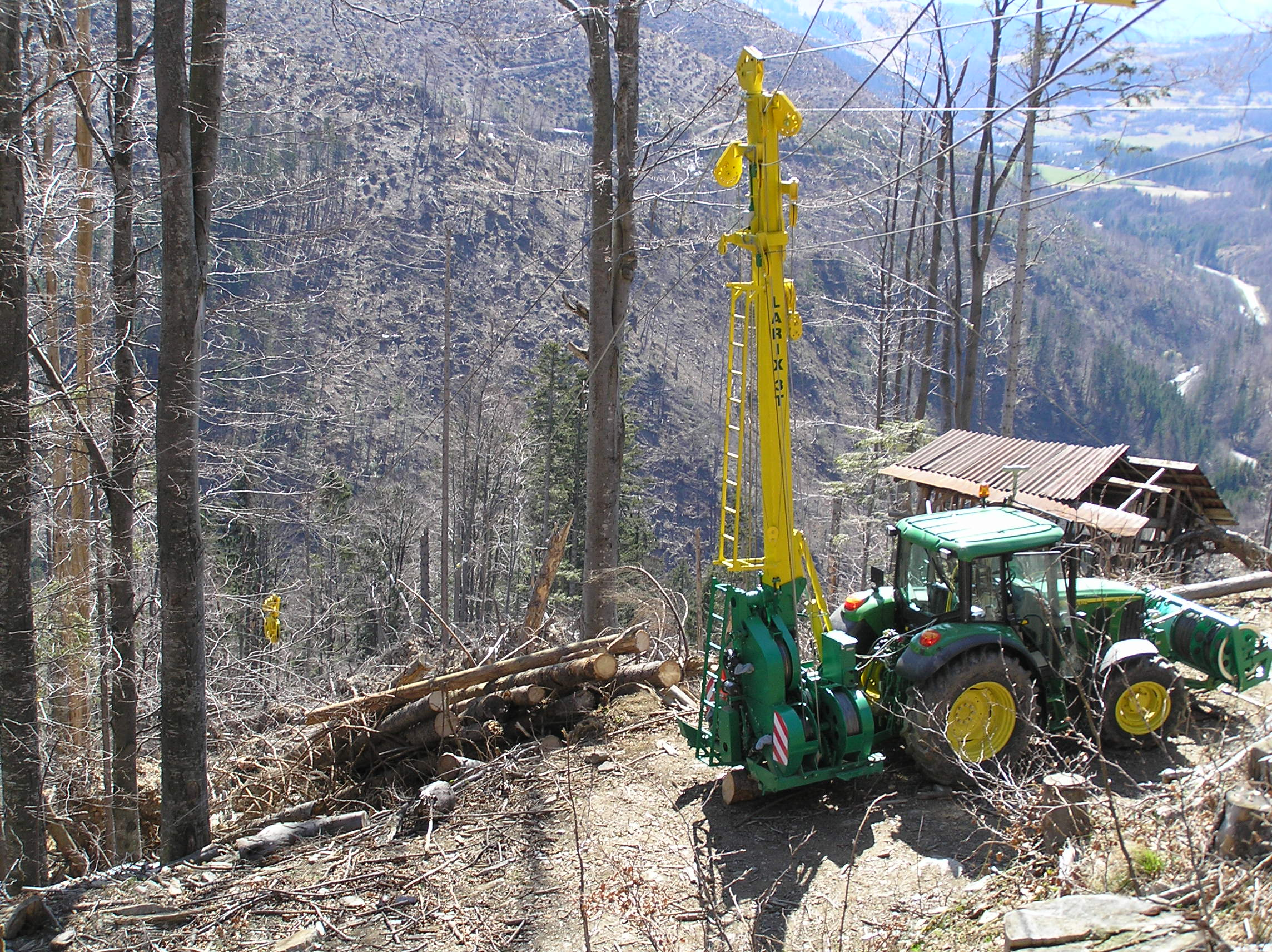
Cable logging in French Alps (cable grue Larix 3T)

Trees and plants are felled and transported to the roadside with top and limbs intact. The trees are then delimbed, topped, and bucked at the landing. This method requires that slash be treated at the landing. In areas with access to cogeneration facilities, the slash can be chipped and used for the production of electricity or heat. Full-tree harvesting also refers to utilization of the entire tree including branches and tops. This technique removes both nutrients and soil cover from the site and so can be harmful to the long-term health of the area if no further action is taken, however, depending on the species, many of the limbs are often broken off in handling so the result may not be as different from tree-length logging as it might seem.

=== Cut-to-length logging ===
Cut-to-length logging is the process of felling, delimbing, bucking, and sorting (pulpwood, sawlog, etc.) at the stump area, leaving limbs and tops in the forest. Mechanical harvesters fell the tree, delimb, and buck it, and place the resulting logs in bunks to be brought to the landing by a skidder or forwarder. This method is routinely available for trees up to 900 mm (35 in) in diameter.

== Transporting logs ==
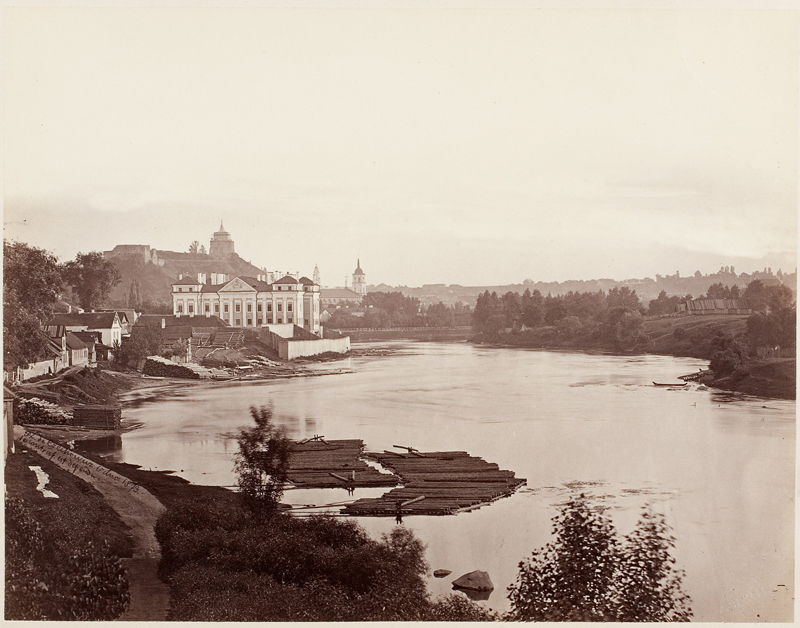
Timber floating in Vilnius, 1873

Logging with Belarus MTZ-82-L in Estonia 2021

Logging methods have changed over time, driven by advancements in transporting timber from remote areas to markets. These shifts fall into three main eras: the manual logging era before the 1880s, the railroad logging era from the 1880s to World War II, and the modern mechanized era that began after the war.

=== Pre-1880s: Pre-Industrial Era ===
In the early days, felled logs were transported using simple methods such as rivers to float tree trunks downstream to sawmills or paper mills. This practice, known as log driving or timber rafting, was the cheapest and most common. Some logs, due to high resin content, would sink and were known as deadheads. Logs were also moved with high-wheel loaders, a set of wheels over ten feet tall, initially pulled by oxen.

=== 1880s to World War II: Railroad Logging Era ===
As the logging industry expanded, the 1880s saw the introduction of mechanized equipment like railroads and steam-powered machinery, marking the beginning of the railroad logging era. Logs were moved more efficiently by railroads built into remote forest areas, often supported by additional methods like high-wheel loaders, tractors and log flumes. The largest high-wheel loader, the "Bunyan Buggie", was built in 1960 for service in California, featuring wheels 24 feet (7.3 m) high.

Loggers with a ten-foot fir log in Shelton, Washington in the early 20th century

=== Post–World War II: Modern Mechanized Logging ===
After World War II, mechanized logging equipment, including chainsaws, diesel trucks, and Caterpillar tractors, transformed the logging industry, making railroad-based logging obsolete. With the advent of these tools, transporting logs became more efficient as new roads were constructed to access remote forests. However, in protected areas like United States National Forests and designated wilderness zones, road building has been restricted to minimize environmental impacts such as erosion in riparian zones.

Today, heavy machinery such as yarders and skyline systems are used to gather logs from steep terrain, while helicopters are used for heli-logging to minimize environmental impact. Less common forms of logging, like horse logging and the use of oxen, still exist but are mostly superseded.

== Safety considerations ==
Logging is a dangerous occupation. In the United States, it has consistently been one of the most hazardous industries and was recognized by the National Institute for Occupational Safety and Health (NIOSH) as a priority industry sector in the National Occupational Research Agenda (NORA) to identify and provide intervention strategies regarding occupational health and safety issues.

In 2008, the logging industry employed 86,000 workers and accounted for 93 deaths. This resulted in a fatality rate of 1.08 deaths per 1,000 workers that year. This rate is over 30 times higher than the overall fatality rate. Forestry/logging-related injuries (fatal and non-fatal) are often difficult to track through formal reporting mechanisms. Thus, some programs have begun to monitor injuries through publicly available reports such as news media. The logging industry experiences the highest fatality rate of 23.2 per 100,000 full-time equivalent (FTE) workers and a non-fatal incident rate of 8.5 per 100 FTE workers. The most common type of injuries or illnesses at work include musculoskeletal disorders (MSDs), which include an extensive list of "inflammatory and degenerative conditions affecting the muscles, tendons, ligaments, joints, peripheral nerves, and supporting blood vessels". Loggers work with heavy, moving weights, and use tools such as chainsaws and heavy equipment on uneven and sometimes steep or unstable terrain. Loggers also deal with severe environmental conditions, such as inclement weather and severe heat or cold. An injured logger is often far from professional emergency treatment.

Traditionally, the cry of "Timber!" developed as a warning alerting fellow workers in an area that a tree is being felled, so they should be alert to avoid being struck. The term "widowmaker" for timber, typically a limb or branch that is no longer attached to a tree, but is still in the canopy either wedged in a crotch, tangled in other limbs, or miraculously balanced on another limb demonstrates another emphasis on situational awareness as a safety principle.

In British Columbia, Canada, the BC Forest Safety Council was created in September 2004 as a not-for-profit society dedicated to promoting safety in the forest sector. It works with employers, workers, contractors, and government agencies to implement fundamental changes necessary to make it safer to earn a living in forestry.

The risks experienced in logging operations can be somewhat reduced, where conditions permit, by the use of mechanical tree harvesters, skidders, and forwarders.

== Bioenergy ==
Bioenergy is a form of energy that derives from recently living organic matter known as biomass. Biomass is made up of plants, forestry and agricultural residues, and multipurpose or dedicated crops and waste. Through combustion, gasification, and fermentation processes biomass can be produced into liquid, gaseous, and solid fuels which are commonly used for transportation, heat, electricity, and other products. Since carbon is released during the combustion of biomass and returned to the atmosphere in a reuse cycle, bioenergy is viewed as a low-emissions fuel. Forest-based industries surrounding woody products such as timber, pulp, and paper are generally a target for biomass reallocation towards renewable energy production.

=== Materials (biomass) ===
Forest biomass typically includes tops, twigs, branches, bark, stumps, roots, small trees, and unmerchantable stem wood. These prominent residues used for bioenergy are generated by thinning, pruning, harvesting and logging. Other forest-based industry residues include black liquors and wood residues such as bark, slab, sawdust and wood chips. These residues that often remain in the cutting area are processed into fuel chips through mobile chipping machines. The common chipping machine collects the residue as it moves along the cutting area and sends it to an extended chipping device and hopper trailer which is attached by a removable body. An abundance in residue makes forestry and forest-based industries such as logging an important source of fuel for bioenergy.

Primary sources of biomass are generated by production (frequently timber), multiple use systems (e.g. agroforestry), or non-use forests (preserved for protection or conservation) forest systems. The amount of biomass and carbon that is stored in these ecosystems varies across biomes, sites, species, stand structure, and silviculture system management with harvest age and intensity of forest management being critical factors of how much carbon gets sequestered. Intensive management forests promote maximizing productivity in the shortest possible time and tend to have higher biomass production than forests with extensive management. Extensive management tends to have lower management intensity and longer production cycles. Energy plantations are sites that are composed of fast growing tree species that have high densities and short cyclical durations to solely produce biomass and increase the supply of bioenergy compared to forest stands managed for timber and pulp. Energy plantations might be a source of renewable energy if it is established in current agricultural land that can be diverted from food or feed production, though large-scale plantations are commonly associated with ethical concerns. Energy plantations can drive land-use conflicts, displace communities, and pose environmental risks.

=== Role of bioenergy ===
Bioenergy meets the need for the minimum, continuous, and reliable power grid demand of baseload electrical power at a relatively low cost. In 2019, bioenergy accounted for 9.5% of total primary energy supply in the United States, and half of all renewable energy consumed in 2017. As a major source of electricity, heat, and transportation energy, there are many ecological concerns associated with intensive biomass removal from forests. Land-intensive bioenergy is limited by the availability, competition, and incompatibility of conservation efforts surrounding land-use. On a less intensive scale, using logging and pulpwood residues show a potential for greenhouse gas emissions reduction, as indicated through a study in Florida which reported an 82% reduction of greenhouse gases through the use of wood pellets. When considering carbon benefits, product use and disposal of forest management such as the lifespan and durability of products are important factors of consideration.

The reallocation of woody residues results in a high potential reduction of CO² emissions in comparison to the use of fossil fuel based materials on many accounts, but is contested by a number of studies indicating there are greater near-term emissions than the fossil fuels it replaces. The concern is raised by how much biomass combustion and the decrease of soil organic carbon caused by organic matter decomposition is an emitter of CO² in the short term. One study indicates that leaving pulpwood and logging residues will sequester carbon on a large scale, though bioenergy development can significantly help carbon savings.

Horse logging in Wales

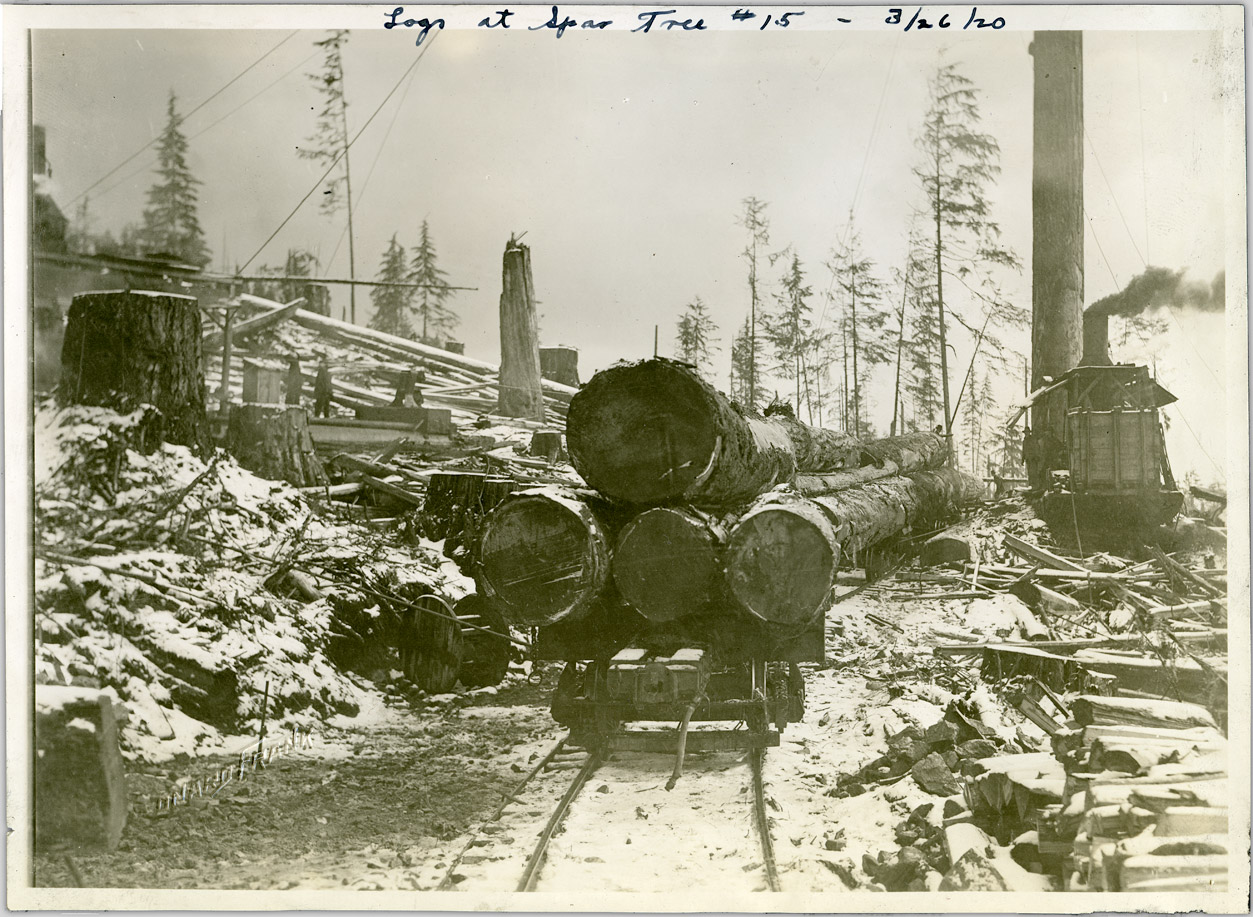
Log transportation by rail in British Columbia in 1920

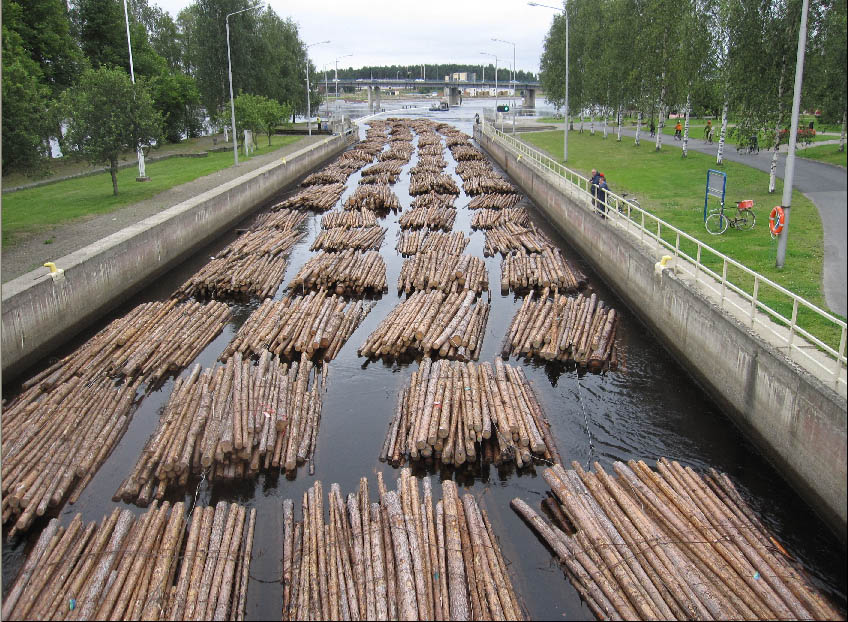
Timber rafting in Joensuu canal, Finland, in 2009

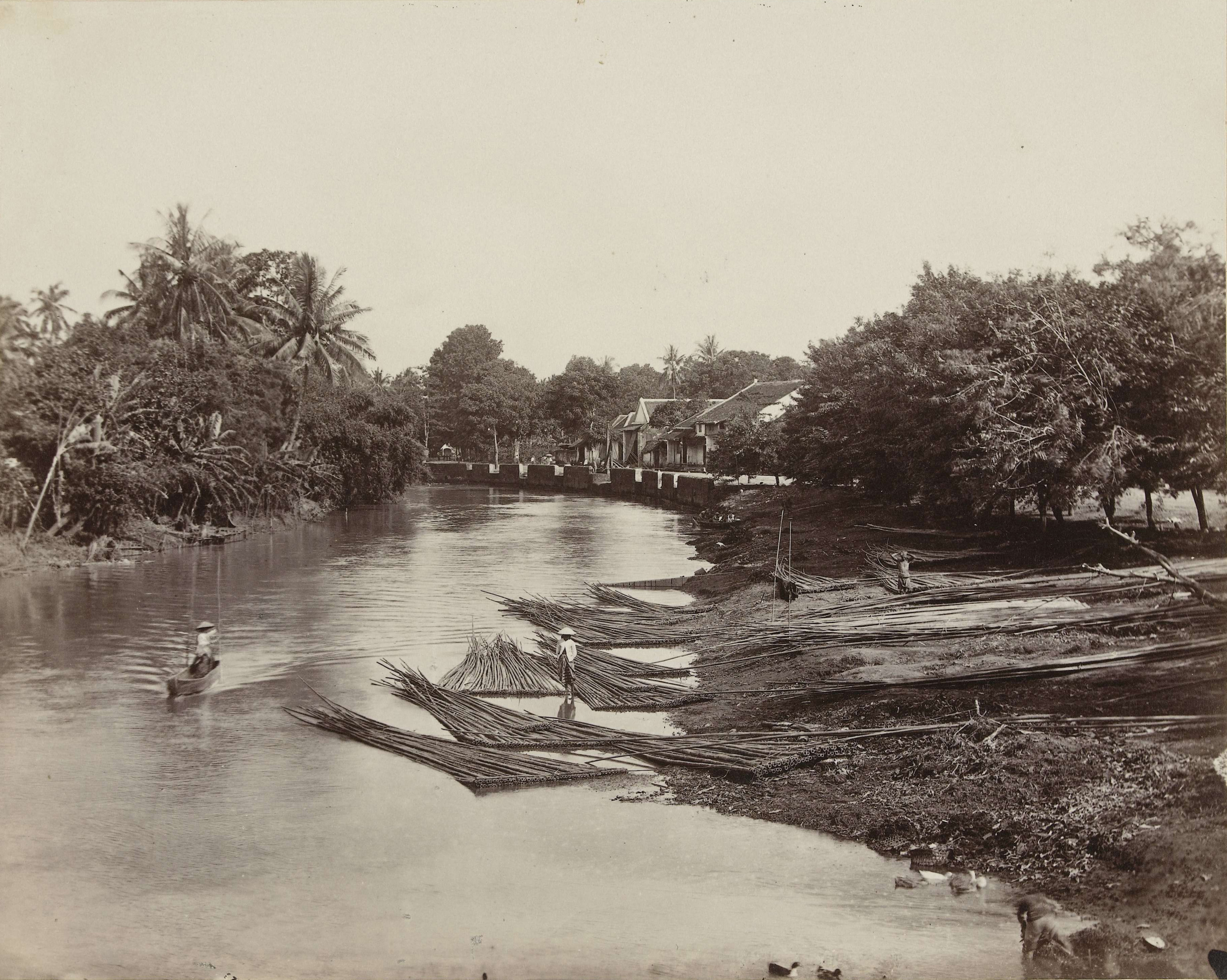
Log transport in the Dutch East Indies (now Indonesia) c. 1870

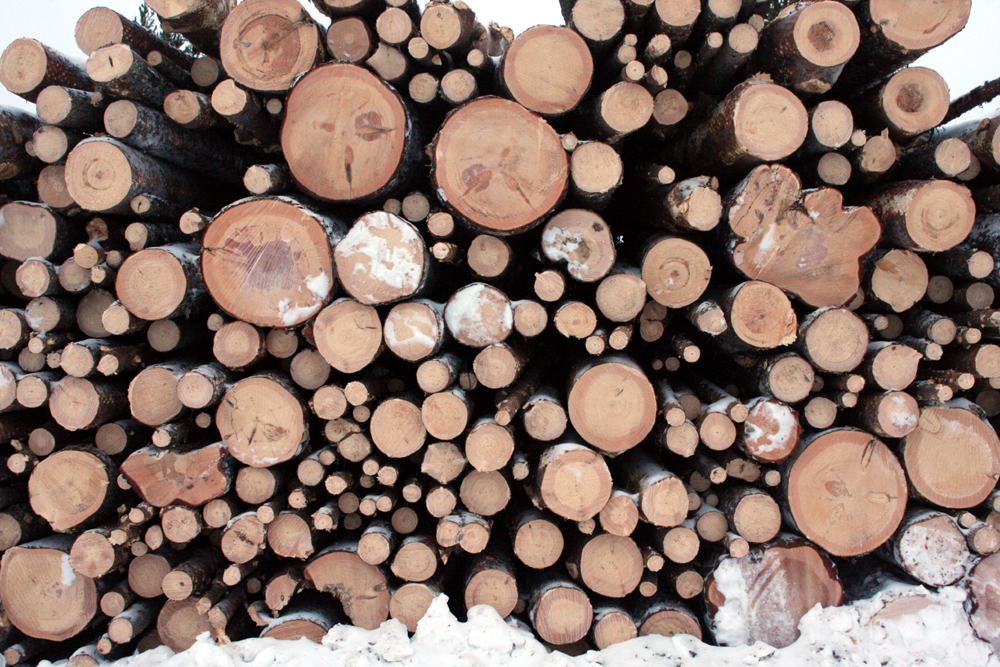
Bucked old growth wood in Finland

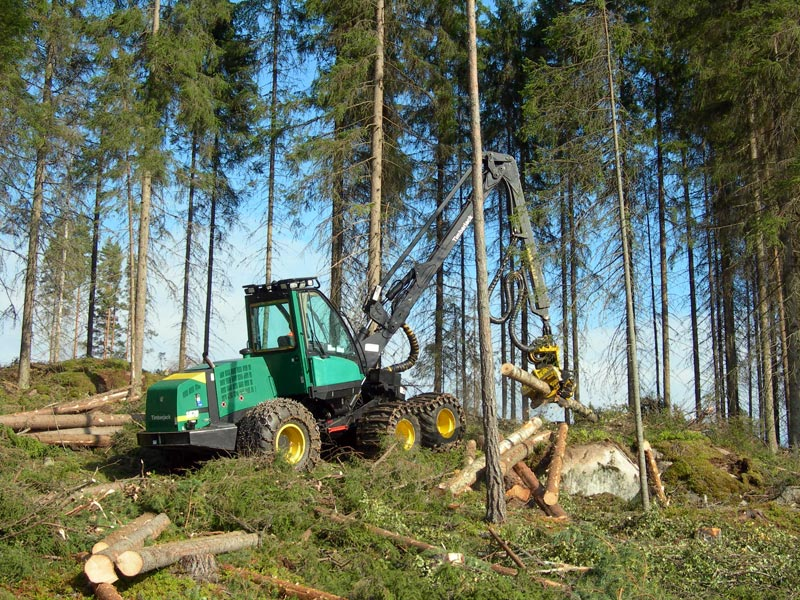
Mechanical harvester at work

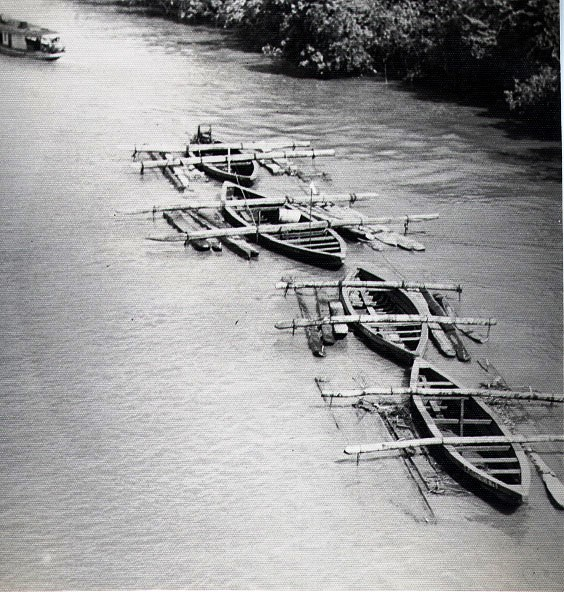
Hardwood logs transported down the Suriname River in South America in 1955

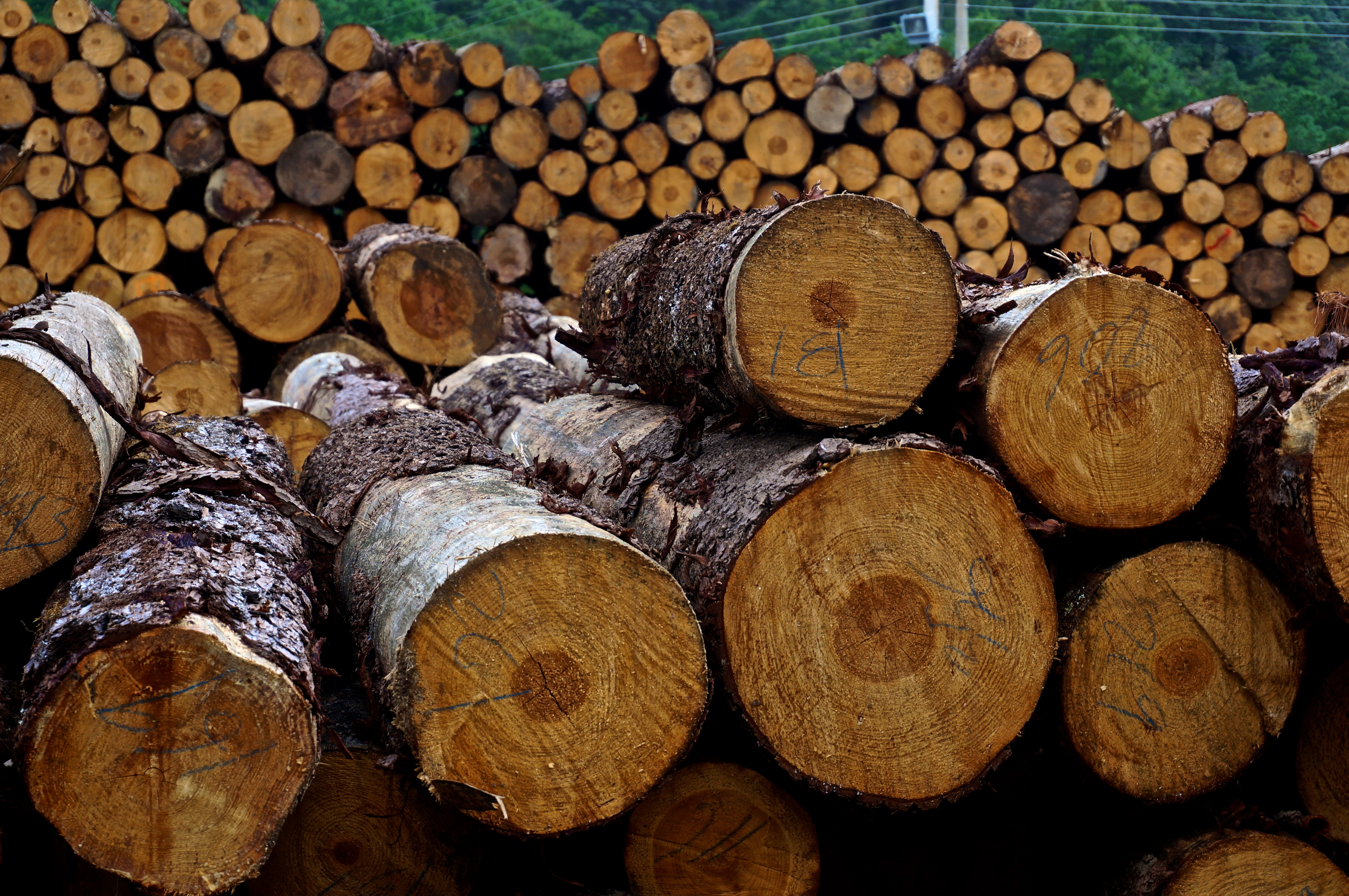
Logs in Mexico in 2018

== See also ==
- Ark (river boat)
- Cable logging, Skyline logging
- Deforestation
  - Deforestation and climate change
- Forest railway or logging railroad
- Logging road
- Heli-logging
- Log driving
- Log scaler
- Lumberjack
  - Lumberjack World Championship
  - Logging camp
- Logging in the Sierra Nevada
- Salvage logging
- Shovel logging
- Silviculture
- Timber rafting
- Wood industry
- Wood economy
- World Forestry Congress
