= Fire control =

Practice of reducing the heat output of a fire

Fire control is the practice of reducing the heat output of a fire, reducing the area over which the fire exists, or suppressing or extinguishing the fire by depriving it of fuel, oxygen, or heat (see fire triangle).

Fire prevention and control is the prevention, detection, and extinguishment of fires, including such secondary activities as research into the causes of fire, education of the public about fire hazards, and the maintenance and improvement of fire-fighting equipment.

== Types of fires and extinguishers ==
In some territories, such as the United States, Europe and Australia, fire types are categorised with letter codes. Each class is a specific type of fire that requires a specific control method based on its cause. Understanding the cause is essential so that the correct fire extinguisher is used; if the wrong extinguisher is used, it can either make the fire worse or fail to control it.

=== Flammable solids: Class A (US/EU/AU) ===
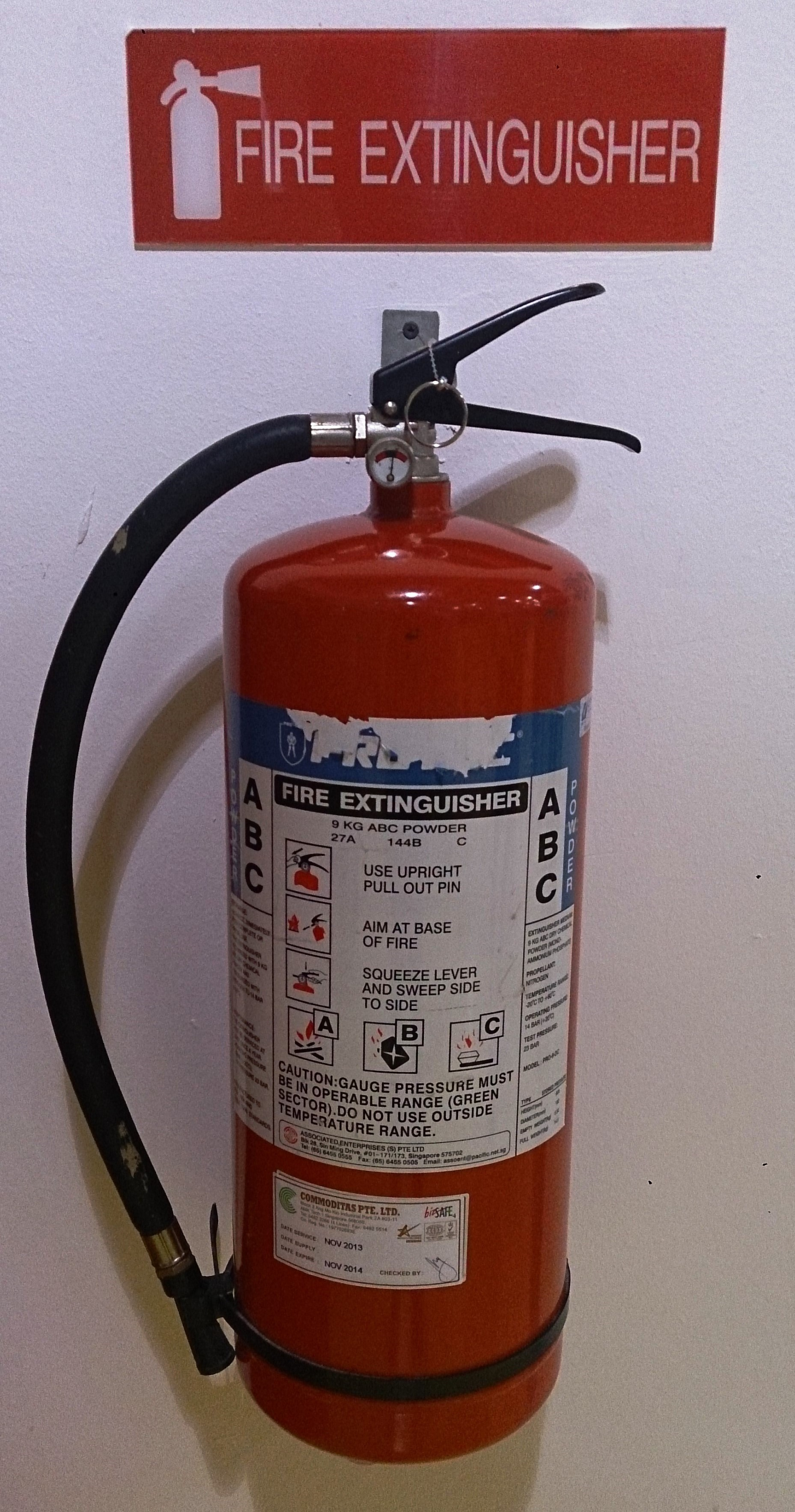
This fire extinguisher is rated for Classes A, B, and C

A fire that is fuelled by ordinary combustible solids, like paper, wood, or plastics is one of the most common and simplest types to extinguish with a fire extinguisher.

The most common method to control them is to remove heat by spraying the burning solid fuels with water. Another control method for most class types of fires would be to reduce the oxygen content in the immediate vicinity of the fire (i.e., "smother" the fire), by, simply, covering it with the natural ground soil or mud. A fire blanket consists of a sheet of a fire retardant material that is placed over most class types of fires in order to smother them. Sodium bicarbonate dry powder is another commonly sourceable method to smother most class types of fires in effective fire control. Another method to smother the fire is the introduction of an inert gas such as carbon dioxide. Another common type of extinguisher uses the chemical monoammonium phosphate.

In a wildfire, fire control includes various wildland fire suppression techniques such as defensible space, widening the fuel ladder, and removing fuel in the fire's path with firebreaks and backfires to minimize the brush fire reaching new combustible fuel and spreading further.

=== Flammable liquids: Class B (US/EU/AU), and flammable gases: Class B (US) / Class C (EU/AU) ===
Many flammable liquid and gas based fires (hydrocarbons, petroleum, and similar fuels) cannot be efficiently controlled with water because fuels with a density less than water (such as gasoline or oil) float on top, resulting in the fire continuing to burn. In addition, the heat of an intense fire may cause water to flash into steam in an explosion which can spread the flaming fuel more widely.

The configuration of some fuels, such as coal and baled waste paper, may result in a deep-seated and burrowing fire, resulting in less effective fire control by the application of water on the outer surfaces of the fuel. Class B fires should be extinguished with foam, powder, or carbon dioxide extinguishers. Some Class-B fires can be controlled with the application of chemical fire suppressants. Applying a combination of fire suppressant foam mixed with water is a common and effective method of forming a blanket on top of the liquid fuel, which eliminates the oxygen needed for combustion.

=== Combustible metals: Class D (US/EU/AU) ===
Fires based on combustible or pyrophoric metals can include those involving potassium, uranium, sodium, lithium, calcium, and plutonium. The most common are those fuelled by magnesium and titanium. The recommended method to extinguish them is to use a dry powder fire extinguisher, which smothers the fire while absorbing heat.

=== Electrical fires: Class C (US) / Class E (AU) / Unclassified (EU) ===
Fires involving electricity as a continuous power source for the ignition of the fuels associated with electrical equipment, such as plastic cable jackets. The application of water does not always result in effective fire control, and there is a general concern regarding conductivity and personnel safety, possibly resulting in electrical shock. They can be effectively controlled by removing the oxygen with a dry powder (typically monoammonium phosphate and sodium bicarbonate) or carbon dioxide, dry chemical ABC extinguisher. The source of electricity also needs to be removed to eliminate re-ignition. Once the electricity is removed, the remaining fire can be dealt with as one of the other classes.

=== Grease fires (cooking): Class F (EU/AU) / Class K (US) ===
Fires involving cooking fats and oils (grease fires) are a distinct cagetory, set apart from other flammable solids and liduids. Water should not be used on such a fire, as it will disperse the material and cause the fire to grow rapidly. The correct type of fire extinguisher is usually a wet chemical fire extinguisher.

== Ventilation ==
Fires can spread through the interior of a structure as the hot gases spread due to the expansion of the gases as a result of the combustion. Some fires can be partially controlled by venting these gases to the outside through manufactured heat vents in the structure's roof, or by the fire department cutting holes in the roof. Ventilation is important when it comes to the fire service, since it is "the systematic removal or heat, smoke and fire gases from a structure". The main purpose for ventilating a fire is to decrease the likelihood of a flashover from occurring. The best time to ventilate is before sending anyone into a structure so that the path the fire will take is through the roof and not through the front door when firefighters open it, allowing more oxygen to feed the fire.

== See also ==
- Fire blanket
- Fire bucket
- Fire classes
- Fire extinguisher
- Firefighting foam
