= Fire safe councils =

Community wildfire safety organizations in California

Fire safe councils are grassroots community-based organizations in California that share the objective of making communities less vulnerable to catastrophic wildfire. Fire safe councils accomplish this objective through education programs and projects such as shaded fuel breaks or firebreaks to protect area residents against an oncoming wildfire and to provide firefighters with a place to fight the oncoming fire. The first fire safe councils started in the early 1990s, and there are now over 100 around the state.

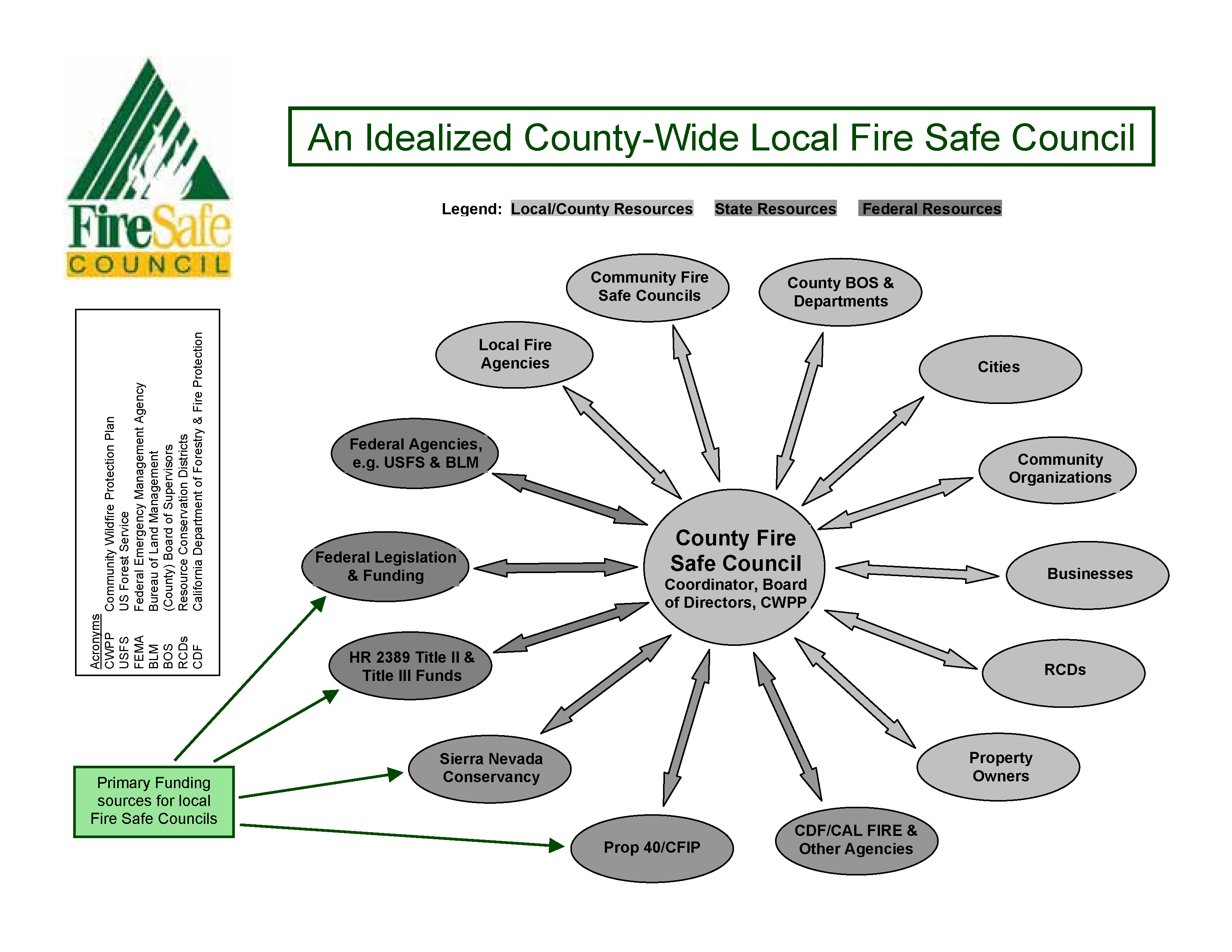
An idealized county-wide fire safe council

The California Fire Safe Council, Inc. (CFSCI) was incorporated in mid-2002 with the primary role of operating the Fire Safe California Grants Clearinghouse. The grassroots fire safe councils are referred to as "local fire safe councils" (FSCs) to distinguish them from the CFSCI.

Local fire safe councils usually include representatives from:

- Fire agencies, including the California Department of Forestry and Fire Protection (CDF or CAL FIRE), the US Forest Service, the Bureau of Land Management, and/or local fire protection districts as appropriate
- Local governments, such as city and/or county
- Businesses, especially insurance
- Other agencies, such as Resource Conservation Districts
- The public

The fire agency and local government representatives may be members of the FSC, or may serve in an advisory capacity, depending on local needs.

All local fire safe councils are independent entities. Some are organized as non-profit and/or tax-exempt corporations; others operate under a memorandum of understanding with a county, city, and/or local fire protection district; some have no formal structure at all.

Fire safe councils vary in focus. Some are county-wide, while others comprise only the Homeowner's Association in a subdivision, to all sizes in between. There are also several regional associations of fire safe councils.

While some fire safe councils have paid staff, such as an executive director, and may have grant funding for fuel reduction projects, all FSCs rely heavily on volunteers for much of their work.

The community-based approach to reducing wildfire risk is being implemented in other locations in the United States. An example is FireSafe Montana. Firewise USA Communities are also community-based organizations focused on wildfire mitigation throughout the United States, including California.

== Evolution ==
=== The "Fire Safe" concept ===
The Operation Fire Safe wildfire prevention program was begun in 1968 by the State of California Resources Agency, Department of Conservation, Division of Forestry, (CDF or CAL FIRE) in response to changing wildfire conditions resulting from more and more homes being built in rural areas that were formerly wildland. The term wildland–urban interface (WUI) is used to describe this area.

Next, the Fire Safe! Inside and Out wildfire prevention campaign was developed in 1989 by Loren Poore, Chief of Fire Prevention with CDF. This program created materials, including a video, a brochure, and other items, to educate homeowners about implementing fire safe practices inside and outside the home. Defensible space began to become the catchword for protecting homes and wildlands in the WUI. At this time, most wildfire safety education was conducted by members of the CDF Volunteers in Prevention (VIP) program.

The Oakland firestorm of 1991 provided a new incentive to increase wildfire prevention education and activities, and CDF formed the Fire Safe Advisory Council, AKA the Fire Safe Council, which included insurance industry representatives, wildland firefighting agencies (such as the U.S. Forest Service (USFS) and the Bureau of Land Management (BLM)), private industry, and the public.

=== The first fire safe councils ===
In the early 1990s, three organizations were formed that were precursors of what eventually became known as local, community-based Fire Safe Councils:

- The Oakhurst Fire Safe Program, located in the central Sierra foothills, was formed as a joint effort by CDF and the US Forest Service, National Park Service, local agencies, community groups, and businesses seeking to formalize a cooperative fire prevention relationship. This program has evolved into the present-day Mariposa County Fire Safe Council.
- The Fire Safe Committee of San Mateo County (now Fire Safe San Mateo County) was formed by the local community.
- Fire Safe Marin in Marin County was formed by the local community in 1992 and remains active today.
- The 1993 Firestorm in Southern California was another major wildfire event. Residents of the Laguna Beach area formed three committees to deal with the losses as well as to prevent, or at least reduce, future losses. These groups evolved into the present-day Greater Laguna Coast Fire Safe Council.

Preceding The Fire Safe Council of Nevada County, Inc. was a working group called the 49er Fire Safe Group (local citizens and Agency Partners taking action after the 49er fire in Nevada County in 1988) was being supported by the local Resource Conservation District, grew into the county-wide organization that exists today. The Fire Safe Council of Nevada County, Inc. began its official formation in January 1998, under the leadership of CDF Battalion Chief Kate Dargan. Chief Dargan is also a founding member at The California Fire Safe Council, and in October 2021, she was appointed Assistant Director for Disaster Preparedness and Response to the White House Climate and Environment Team.

=== CDF support for fire safe councils ===
In support of the community-based efforts, CDF began including these local groups in its Fire Safe Council. The coalition was headed by the CDF Public Education Officer. Sometime after 1996, as more and more communities started local Fire Safe Councils throughout the state, the Fire Safe Council became known as the California Fire Safe Council (CFSC). The CFSC was a precursor of the current California Fire Safe Council, Inc. (CFSCI).

Through the CFSC, CDF assisted local fire safe councils via monthly meetings where local fire safe councils, and other organizations sharing the fire safe mission, could network; marketing literature such as a brochure; development of videos and Public Service Announcements; a handbook on how to form a Fire Safe Council; and other materials. Marketing support was provided under a contract with the public relations firm Manning Selvage & Lee, which had an office on K Street in Sacramento at the time.

This overall support from CDF ceased when the California Fire Safe Council, Inc. was formed as a 501(c)(3) non-profit corporation in mid-2002. However, most individual CDF/CAL FIRE Units continue to work closely with their local area fire safe councils, often providing "in-kind" matching funds for grants as well as advice on fire safe projects.

=== The number of fire safe councils expands ===
With active support from CDF and its California Fire Safe Council coalition, more and more communities began forming local Fire Safe Councils. Expansion of the program accelerated after the Fire Safe Council of Nevada County (FSCNC) received a Wildland Urban Interface (WUI) grant in 1998. One of the conditions of the WUI grant was that the executive director of the FSCNC takes an active role in assisting other communities to form Fire Safe Councils and aids in their success. FSCNC staff, at all levels, continue to offer support and/or mentorship to any fire safe council that inquires.

Now, over 100 local Fire Safe Councils are active in California alone, with more forming all the time.

== Networking for fire safe councils ==
Prior to the incorporation of the CFSCI, the California Fire Safe Council was the primary means of networking for local FSCs. After incorporation, the CFSCI continued to host the monthly meetings for local FSCs until November 2006, when budget constraints would no longer allow for the expense.

== Funding ==
=== Federal funding ===
In California, Federal funding is administered by the California Fire Safe Council, Inc. (CFSCI) which operates the Fire Safe California Grants Clearinghouse AKA Grants Clearinghouse. Funding is provided to the Grants Clearinghouse by the US Forest Service (USFS), the Bureau of Land Management (BLM), the National Park Service, and the Fish and Wildlife Service. (Note that these agencies, notably the USFS, may have other grant funding streams that do not go through the Clearinghouse.)

Beginning in 2001, Title II and Title III funds from the Secure Rural Schools and Community Self Determination Act of 2000 (AKA "HR 2389") were another source of funds for FSCs in Counties that qualify for HR 2389 payments, especially for staff, operations, and education projects, as funds from the Grants Clearinghouse are generally not available for these functions. These funds are paid to Counties, and it was up to the Counties to decide how they are used. In the past, many Counties used at least a portion of the funds for fire safe activities.

=== State funding ===
State funding varies from year to year as programs come and go. Check with your CAL FIRE Unit or County Resource Conservation District or current information.

All of the State and Federal funding sources described in this section require matching funds, either in the form of cash or "in-kind", such as labor, materials, vehicles, etc. While not a formal program, most CAL FIRE units provide financial assistance to their local fire safe councils in the form of "in-kind" matching funds for grants.

=== Other funding sources ===
Other sources of funds for fire safe councils are donations from the community, membership dues, grants from sources other than listed here, and funding from their county and/or city government. In addition, a percentage for administration is usually a component of any grants received, although these funds are restricted in that they can only be used on activities associated with the particular grant and must be accounted for to the funding agency.

== Examples of fire safe council accomplishments ==
This section is not intended to be exhaustive, but rather to give a few examples of what has been accomplished by fire safe councils over the years. Most of these projects were funded by grants.

=== Special needs assistance ===
Many fire safe councils operate a program that assists people with special needs, such as seniors, low-income, and disabled persons, to create and maintain the defensible space around their homes. Some examples are:

- El Dorado County Fire Safe Council Senior Assistance
- Plumas County Fire Safe Council Senior & Disabled Assistance Program
- Fire Safe Council of Nevada County Access and Functional Needs Program

=== Free chipper program ===
One difficulty homeowners have with creating and maintaining defensible space is what to do with the vegetation once it is removed. To help with this, many fire safe councils provide free access to a chipper. An example is the Kern River Valley Fire Safe Council Chipper Days.

=== Defensible space inspection/education program ===
The purpose of these programs is to educate homeowners about creating adequate defensible space and advice for home hardening modifications to reduce the risk of structure loss in a wildfire. These are also called "dooryard visits" by some fire safe councils. These volunteers are trained by their local CAL FIRE Unit or their local Fire Protection District.

For example, the Fire Safe Council of Nevada County has a Defensible Space Advisory Visit service. Visits are free, and anonymous to allow residents the comfort to ask all the questions they need to ask. Advisors assist the resident to build a customized action plan for risk reduction or improvements that can be made.

=== Fuel breaks ===
While defensible space protects homes from wildfire, firebreaks, also called fuel breaks, protect communities. These may also be referred to as "shaded fuel breaks". Fuel breaks are usually linear. The US Forest Service also uses the Strategically Placed Area Treatment (SPLAT) concept. SPLATs may be any shape. Many fuel breaks have been created by fire safe councils, using grant funding. One example is the Eastern Madera County Fire Safe Council Crooks Mountain Fuel Break.

=== Community wildfire protection plans ===
The Federal funding sources described in the section on Funding either require that projects be part of an approved Community Wildfire Protection Plan (CWPP), or give preference to such projects. In response, many FSCs have taken a proactive role in getting these plans developed and approved, even though this responsibility really resides with local government.

=== A sampling of other projects ===
- The Greater Laguna Coast Fire Safe Council Red Flag Program is designed to complement the official steps taken by the fire fighting professionals to provide a highly visible reminder to all citizens in the region to be extra careful and vigilant on the days when the Santa Ana winds blow.
- In 2011, The Fire Safe Council of Nevada County published a Fire Wise Plants for Western Nevada County], which is distributed by a local nursery, among other places. The nursery reported a significant shift in the mix of plants people purchase.
- A helpful tool for homeowners is a list of local contractors who do fuel reduction work. The Fire Safe Council of Nevada County maintains a list of contractors by category, and the El Dorado County Fire Safe Council has a Fuels Reduction Contractors List.
- At the request of the Butte County Fire Safe Council, California State Assemblyman Rick Keene authored legislation (AB 1883) to streamline the process by which local Fire Safe Councils may contract with CAL FIRE to have inmate fire crews implement fuel reduction projects. This bill became law on August 4, 2008.

== Recognition of fire safe councils ==
Many fire safe councils, as well as individual contributors, have received recognition of their efforts to improve the ability for California's communities to survive a wildfire. Since it is impossible to list all of these, the following examples are offered in honor of all who have contributed to this important effort.

=== National recognition ===
- In 2001, the Bronze Smokey Award was presented to the Fire Safe Council of Nevada County by the US Forest Service for providing outstanding public service in wildfire prevention. The Bronze Smokey is the highest National honor given for community-based fire prevention work.
- In 2002, the Yuba Watershed Protection and Fire Safe Council received a Bronze Smokey from the USFS
- In 2003, Idyllwild's Mountain Communities Fire Safe Council received a national award from the USFS in recognition of its contributions to the community over the past year.
- In 2004, Plumas County Fire Safe Council was recognized by the US Forest Service Chief with the Rural Community Assistance National Leadership Award for, "Outstanding accomplishments through their exceptional leadership, vision, and perseverance in working collaboratively to reduce the risk of catastrophic wildfire in Plumas County".
- In 2005, Luana Dowling, Fire Chief for Iowa Hill and Chair of the Foresthill/Iowa Hill Fire Safe Council, received recognition from the US Forest Service for her success in obtaining funding for, and then implementing, various fuel reduction projects on USFS and BLM land near Foresthill and Iowa Hill.

Numerous national recognition has been awarded since 2005.

=== State recognition ===
- In 2000, Laura Dyberg, President of the Mountain Rim Fire Safe Council in Southern California, was named Woman of the Year for the 31st Senate District of California by Senator Jim Brulte
- in 2007, Governor Arnold Schwarzenegger included fire safe councils in his Executive Order S-07-07 as one of the resources available to CAL FIRE "to support a heightened level of fire prevention public awareness and education"
- In 2008, the California Legislature enacted a joint resolution, SCR 80 (Cogdill) recognizing that "local Fire Safe Councils work to educate communities, provide wildfire safety planning, fire prevention, and educational programs throughout the state and remain a critical component of statewide fire protection efforts."

=== Local recognition ===
- In 2003, Fire Safe Marin received the Regional Excellence Award from the Board of Supervisors for its work to support fire agencies across Marin County in protecting life, property, and the environment for the citizens of Marin.
- On October 19, 2004, Robin Yonash, Founder of the Greater Colfax Area Fire Safe Council, received a commendation from the Placer County Board of Supervisors (Resolution 2004–163) for promoting fire safety throughout Placer County.
- In 2006, the Fallbrook Fire Safe Council was honored as the Fire Safe Council of the Year for San Diego County for "its extraordinary efforts to improve fire safety in the community" by the North County Fire Protection District (NCFPD).
- In 2006, Blair Ceniceros received a plaque from Riverside County commemorating his tenure as President of the Mountain Communities Fire Safe Council. Ceniceros began his leadership as president of the MCFSC in 2003 and stepped down in May 2006 but remained on the Board.
- On October 18, 2006, the third anniversary of the Cedar Fire entry into the City of San Diego, Jerry Mitchell, Director of the Scripps Ranch Fire Safe Council, was presented the Channel 10 (KGTV) Leadership Award for starting the fire safe council in October 2003. Mr. Mitchell also received the Fire Safe Council of San Diego County Volunteer of the Year Award and the United States Senate Certificate of Appreciation.
- In 2007, The Greater Auburn Area Fire Safe Council was awarded the Citizen Outstanding Service Award by the Placer County Fire Chief's Association. The citizen-led Greater Auburn Area Fire Safe Council was recognized for working hand-in-hand with local and state fire agencies in Auburn, Newcastle, and Penryn, in identifying ways to educate residents on protecting their families and homes from wildfire.
- In 2007, Janice Fast, a longtime member, staunch supporter, and volunteer of the Mountain Communities Fire Safe Council was awarded the Mountain Communities Fire Safe Council's first "Citizen of the Year" award.

There have been numerous other awards and recognition since 2007.

== California community-based fire safe councils ==
For a list of current fire safe councils in California see the "Fire Safe Councils" link on the California Fire Safe Council site.

== Relationship with the California Fire Safe Council, Inc. ==
As described earlier in this article, initially fire safe councils throughout the state, with support from CDF staff and other organizations that shared the fire safe mission, comprising the California Fire Safe Council (CFSC).

However, with the incorporation of the California Fire Safe Council, Inc. (CFSCI) in mid-2002, the old inclusive CFSC disappeared and was replaced by a non-membership 501(c)(3) non-profit corporation. The CFSCI Board of Directors and its staff comprise the CFSCI. Local fire safe councils are no longer members and have minimal impact on, or knowledge of, decisions made by the CFSCI. The CFSCI is simply one more entity among the over 100 independent organizations that focus on wildfire safety throughout the state of California. It has a somewhat different function from local FSCs in that its primary role is to administer the Grants Clearinghouse.

== Firewise USA ==
Like fire safe councils, the Firewise USA program is designed to reach beyond the fire service by involving homeowners, community leaders, planners, developers, and others in the effort to protect people, property, and natural resources from the risk of wildland fire - before a fire starts. Fire safe councils and Firewise USA both emphasize community responsibility for planning in the design of a safe community as well as effective emergency response, and individual responsibility for safer home construction and design, landscaping, and maintenance.

The Firewise USA program is intended to serve as a resource for agencies, tribes, organizations, fire departments, and communities across the U.S. who are working toward a common goal: reduce loss of lives, property, and resources to wildland fire by building and maintaining communities in a way that is compatible with our natural surroundings. It differs from fire safe councils in that the Firewise program is nationwide while fire safe councils are mainly in California.

The two approaches to motivating community members to take responsibility for preparing their communities to be better able to survive a wildfire are very compatible. The major difference between the two methods is that to be certified by Firewise USA, the entire community must be involved, including financially, whereas fire safe councils, especially those that are 501(c)(3) organizations, can operate with a much smaller level of individual participation. Also, fire safe councils often implement projects which go beyond a single community, such as shaded fuel breaks.

The Firewise USA communities in California are often chapters of a county-wide fire safe council, but they also function independently if that best serves the community.

Firewise USA offers a wide range of resources including printed materials as well as courses.

== See also ==
- California Fire Safe Council
- Fire Safe California Grants Clearinghouse
