= California Fire Safe Council =

Name of two different organizations

Fire Safe Council Logo (used by the CFSC and local fire safe councils)

The name California Fire Safe Council (CFSC) has been used for two very different organizations. The original use of the name, from 1993 through mid-2002, referred to a loose consortium of local community-based fire safe councils and other organizations that shared the mission of making California's communities less vulnerable to catastrophic wildfire. It was funded by the state of California Resources Agency, Department of Conservation, Division of Forestry, also called CDF or CAL FIRE. It was led by staff from the CDF Prevention Bureau.

In mid-2002 a 501(c)(3) non-profit organization was formed by members of the former CFSC using the name California Fire Safe Council, Inc. (CFSCI). At the moment the CFSCI came into existence, the former CFSC ceased to exist because the CFSCI was specifically set up as a non-membership corporation. (Subsequently, the Board amended the bylaws to create a class of "at-large members." However, these "members" have no voting rights.) The reason for creating the CFSCI was for it to be able to administer grants and collect the administration fee for operations rather than using grant funds for that function, since CDF had ceased funding for the old CFSC due to budget restraints.

== The California Fire Safe Council: initially an inclusive coalition ==
=== A need develops: prior to 1993 ===
In the early 1990s, the California Department of Forestry and Fire Protection (CDF or CAL FIRE) was facing increasing costs for wildfire suppression due to the influx of people building homes in what had previously been unpopulated wildlands. This area of mixed homes and wildlands is variously called the Wildland Urban Interface, Urban-Wildland Interface, or the I-Zone (where I=Interface). Now during a wildland fire, more and more CDF firefighting resources had to be used to defend homes and lives, which meant that it was taking increased time and resources to get fires under control. Also, since over 90% of fires are started by human activity, the number of fires was increasing due to the increased population.

In response, CDF stepped up its efforts to educate the public in "fire safe" principles, generally referred to as defensible space, which can prepare a home to withstand an approaching wildfire and allow the firefighting resources to focus on controlling the fire. These same principles reduce the chance that a house fire will spread to the wildlands. In 1991, the CDF Fire Prevention Unit introduced the "Fire Safe - Inside and Out" program as part of the ongoing "Fire Safe - California" campaign. The intent of the new public awareness program was to help people who live in the wildlands learn to protect themselves and their property, inside and out, from wildfire. The program package included a video, a homeowners booklet, a fire safe checklist, a brochure, and a poster. The creator of the program, Bruce Turbeville, received a Bronze Smokey in recognition of his efforts.

=== The Fire Safe Advisory Council: 1993 to 1995 ===
In 1993 the State of California was facing an extreme budget deficit. CDF's budget had been shrinking for many years, and with the sharp decline in 1993 and increasing costs, the Department could no longer sustain its level of service unless something new was done. In May, in a special edition of the CDF in-house newsletter, Communiqué, CDF Director Richard Wilson announced the report entitled "Targeting CDF's Future", which was a result of an extensive planning project to identify ways CDF could improve its efficiency and effectiveness. One theme of the report was that CDF must "…seek out cooperative relationships with the private sector and other government agencies…"

A direct result was the formation of the "Fire Safe Advisory Council" in 1993 "as a means to help support the department's shrinking education budget by enlisting the monetary and in-kind support of the private sector." Initially, the Fire Safe Advisory Council consisted of representatives of the building, insurance, real estate, and utilities industries plus various government agencies such as the California Office of Emergency Services.

The following year, when Rich Just took the position of Staff Chief for Fire Prevention and Law Enforcement at Sacramento Headquarters, he said: "The Fire Safe Advisory Council is [a] means of bringing together agencies and business leaders from insurance companies to landscape firms to work on providing dollars and ideas to spread the prevention message here in California. … The path prevention is taking now is toward "communities". We've seen the disastrous effects of wildfires over the past several years, where entire communities have been devastated by fire. Educating the public on the firesafe measures they must take to give their homes and neighborhoods a fighting chance has become critical here in California."

=== The Fire Safe Council: 1995 to 1997 ===
Chief Just's vision inspired local Ranger Units to work with their communities to become fire safe. By 1995, two community partnerships were well on their way. One was the Shingletown Community Fire Safe Project in the Shasta-Trinity Ranger Unit. Another was the Oakhurst-Ahwahnee Basin Community Fire Protection Project in the Madera-Mariposa-Merced Ranger Unit. Having the local Ranger Units involved in fostering community partnerships was also the philosophy of CDF Director Richard Wilson: "As CDF takes the Fire Safe Council concept to local communities, the field will become an important resource and uniting force. Ranger units can and should play a leadership role in this effort to form local fire safe councils." Director Wilson also said: "As more Californians move into wildland/urban intermix areas, a coordinated group effort has to be made to keep them safe from wildfire. We can't afford to have a fire engine in front of every home day and night; we must help our communities prepare for fire before it happens."

At this time, the former Fire Safe Advisory Council became known as the Fire Safe Council with the "mission to preserve California's natural and man-made resources by mobilizing all Californians to make their homes, neighborhoods and communities fire safe. More than 30 businesses and government organizations sit on the statewide council. The objectives of the organization are to unite members to speak with one voice about fire safety, use the marketing expertise and communication channels of member organizations to increase distribution of fire prevention education materials and empower grass roots organizations to create fire safe communities." People interested in forming a local fire safe council were directed to contact their Ranger Unit.

In 1996, the Fire Safe Council/CDF, in cooperation with the Western Insurance Information Service, developed a Community Action Kit to assist the formation of local community-based fire safe councils. Also in 1996, as mentioned in the Community Action Kit, the updated "California Fire Plan" from CDF and the "Introduction to the I-Zone", sponsored by the Federal Emergency Management Agency (FEMA), the California Department of Forestry and Fire Protection (CDF), the Governor's Office of Emergency Services (OES), and the University of California Forest Products Laboratory (UCFPL) both mentioned the value of creating local fire safe councils in California's communities.

=== The California Fire Safe Council: 1997–2001 ===
By the end of 1997, the organization had changed its name to the California Fire Safe Council to reflect the increasing number of local fire safe councils being created around the state. People wanting to form local fire safe councils were now directed to contact the CDF Sacramento Headquarters Public Education Office. By January 1998, there were 50 local fire safe councils, and a web site was created for the California Fire Safe Council, which included pages for each local council. Local councils continued to form and to participate as part of the California Fire Safe Council coalition.

=== Years of transition: 2001–2002 ===
In 2001, several things happened that set the CFSC on a new path which eventually led to the formation of the California Fire Safe Council, Inc., a 501(c)(3) non-profit corporation. These were:

- Bruce Turbeville retired, and CDF named a new Public Education Officer
- CDF reduced their funding support for the CFSC
- The National Fire Plan provided a potential new funding stream
- The Community-Based Wildfire Prevention Grants Program was established

Each of these is explored in more depth below.

==== A new CDF Public Education Officer ====
Bruce Turbeville, who had developed and administered the CFSC since 1993, retired in early 2001. At the March 8, 2001 monthly meeting, he "introduced [Deputy Chief] Bryan Zollner, the new Public Education Officer for the California Department of Forestry and Fire Protection." Turbeville continued in his role as the Chairman of the California Fire Safe Council. Chief Zollner led the effort to establish the BLM Community-Based Wildfire Prevention Grants Program.

==== CDF reduced funding ====
Due to the state of California's financial situation in 2001, CDF was facing a significant budget reduction, which included cutting back on funding for the Prevention department. Since it was the Prevention department which funded the operation of the CFSC, Bruce Turbeville, who was still acting as the Chairman of the CFSC since his retirement in early 2001, was told that while CDF supported the Council, it could no longer be the sole source of funds; the CFSC needed to find other ways to support its programs

==== New funding ====
In response to the wildland fires of 2000, President Bill Clinton requested, and the Secretaries of the Department of the Interior and Department of Agriculture submitted, a September 8, 2000, report, Managing the Impact of Wildfires on Communities and the Environment, A Report to the President In Response to the Wildfires of 2000. This report, its accompanying budget request, Congressional direction for substantial new appropriations for wildland fire management, resulting action plans and agency strategies and the Western Governors Association's A Collaborative Approach for Reducing Wildland Fire Risks to Communities and the Environment - A 10-Year Comprehensive Strategy - Implementation Plan have collectively become known as the National Fire Plan.

The National Fire Plan, and the subsequent Healthy Forests Initiative (HFI), significantly increased Federal funding for projects on private lands, both "on the ground" and educational, that would reduce the wildfire risk to Federal lands.

For the first time, the Bureau of Land Management (BLM) had funds available for grants to private organizations. Unlike the United States Forest Service, (USFS), BLM did not have any internal structure in place to administer grants to the private sector.

Initially, CDF planned to route BLM funds through its ranger units and then to the local fire safe councils. However, this proved not to be a viable option because it would only be able to disburse the grant funds on a reimbursable basis. This meant that grant recipients would not receive their grant funds until after work had been done and paid for, and local fire safe councils did not have the operating budgets to be able to do that.

==== Establishment of the BLM Community-Based Wildfire Prevention Grants Program ====
Since the BLM funds could not be routed through CDF, a search was begun to locate a 501(c)(3) non-profit organization that could accept the funds, disburse them, and provide an accounting to BLM. At the Monthly Meeting on June 21, 2001, Chief Zollner announced that the Sacramento Regional Foundation (SRF) had been chosen to serve as the grant administrator. This program subsequently became known as the "Community-Based Wildfire Prevention Grants Program." The Sacramento Regional Foundation agreed to host the grant program under contract with the Bureau of Land Management until 2006 or until it (the SRF) had hosted $10 million in grants, whichever came first. In return for this service, the SRF received an administrative fee (AKA "indirect cost rate") based on the amount of funds it administered: 8% on up to $2,000,000; declining gradually to just 5% on over $10,000,000.

In order to qualify to receive grants through the SRF, recipients had to be 501(c)(3) non-profit organizations, or have a fiscal sponsor which was a non-profit, such as a Resource Conservation District. Alternatively, the California Community Forests Foundation (CCFF) was available to work with local fire safe councils that did not yet have 501(c)(3) status.

Indeed, the CFSC itself used the CCFF to administer "five grants provided by the Bureau of Land Management via the Sacramento Community Foundation. These funds will support for the ongoing development of the California Fire Safe Council by providing for the Fire Safe Council executive director and council administration and development of public education outreach materials including a new Fire Safe Council webpage (www.firesafecouncil.org)." A total of $716,665 was received from the Sacramento Regional Foundation for these grants.

The SRF operated the Community-Based Wildfire Prevention Grants Program for 2001 and 2002, at which point it was nearing the $10 million limit it had agreed. Something else needed to be done.

==== Formation of the California Fire Safe Council, Inc. ====
The idea of formalizing the California Fire Safe Council as a 501(c)(3) non-profit corporation was first proposed at a monthly meeting on May 24, 2001. Discussions eventually resulted in the Administrative Action Group (AAG) subcommittee taking on this task in April 2002.

The work of the AAG resulted in the following:

- Articles of Incorporation for the California Fire Safe Council, Inc. (CFSCI), a 501(c)(3) non-profit corporation
- Final draft Bylaws
- Selection of a slate of candidates for the first Board of Directors
- Election of the first Board by local fire safe councils; i.e. the general membership of the CFSC

== The California Fire Safe Council, Inc. (CFSCI): an independent corporation ==
=== The CFSCI begins ===
In mid-2002 the CFSCI was established as a non-membership 501(c)(3) corporation under non-profit law. The CFSCI Board of Directors and its staff comprise the CFSCI. (Subsequently, the CFSCI Board amended the bylaws to create a class of "at-large members," however the at-large members have no voting rights.)

The CFSCI was set up as a non-membership organization because the AAG felt it would be too cumbersome to include representatives from all local FSCs in future voting, due to how many local councils there were and how difficult it was to determine how the various FSCs would be represented, given how many different types of FSCs there were. Instead, the AAG divided the state into three regions: Coast, Sierra, and Southern California, and created a seat on the Board for each region. The intention was for these representatives to have an ongoing two-way dialog with the local councils in their regions and thus allow local councils and the Board to be in communication through the local representative.

The following people were elected as the initial Board Members: Bruce Turbeville, Chairman; Ken Blonski, Vice Chairman; Leo McElroy, Secretary; and David Horne, Treasurer. A nominating committee, a legislative review committee, a public education committee and a development committee were established.

The first meeting of the new board of directors for the California Fire Safe Council, Inc. (CFSCI) was held on August 21, 2002.

=== Differences in the role and function of the CFSCI vs the former CFSC ===
The CFSCI differs from the former CFSC in several ways:

- The CFSCI is not statewide. It is a business with headquarters in McClellan Park, California.
- The current CFSCI is not a coalition or an umbrella organization or a confederation. It is an independent 501(c)(3) business.
- The CFSCI is not a "community level cooperator." It is the local fire safe councils which operate at the community level.
- Calling the CFSCI "the" Fire Safe Council ignores the fact that it is one of hundreds fire safe organizations.
- Contrary to its stated mission to "Mobilize Californians to protect their homes, communities and environment from wildfires," it is the local community-based fire safe councils and Firewise USA organizations that empower their communities. The CFSCI channels (mostly Federal) funding to support this.

=== Relationship with local fire safe councils ===
The CFSCI is one entity among the hundreds independent organizations that focus on wildfire safety throughout the state of California. It has a somewhat different function from local fire safe councils in that its primary role is to administer Federal funding through the Fire Safe California Grants Clearinghouse on behalf of the members of the California Fire Alliance.

There was nothing in the Bylaws that created the CFSCI about the CFSCI having any control over local FSCs. Local FSCs are independent organizations, as is the CFSCI. Bruce Turbeville himself said in his April 2002 White Paper that he wrote during the process of forming the CFSCI: "Once formed, the local Councils did not want the [C]FSC telling them how to conduct their business, but did want the FSC to provide them with tools they couldn't create on their own to facilitate the success of their Councils."

However, in the past the CFSCI has made several attempts to establish a top-down organizational structure with itself at the head. All of these were eventually abandoned, and local fire safe councils have retained their independence.

- 2006: Trademark applications submitted to restrict use of the fire safe logo and the phrase "Fire Safe Council"
- 2006: "Code of Conduct" for local fire safe councils proposed
- 2006: "Affiliate Structure" proposed
- 2007: "Smart Growth Program" to certify local Fire Safe Councils proposed

=== Funding for the CFSCI ===
==== Federal funding ====
The California Fire Safe Council, Inc. receives reimbursement for direct and indirect expenses for administering the block grants that go through the Clearinghouse. These funds are "restricted" in that they can only be used for activities associated with administering the Clearinghouse funds. These activities include conducting grant writing workshops on how to apply for Clearinghouse grants, convening the annual Review Committee that selects projects to fund and providing administrative support for that Committee, disbursing funds to the grant recipients, processing status reports from recipients, and other tasks required by the funding agencies. Operating expenses incurred by the CFSCI outside of grant administration, such as lobbying and fund raising, must be funded from other sources.

In addition, the CFSCI has received direct grants, both for Clearinghouse operation and for other projects. Some, but not all, of these grants are listed on the fedspending.org database. Note that some grants are listed multiple times in this database.

==== Non-governmental funding ====
From time to time the CFSCI has received grants from non-Federal sources, primarily insurance organizations. These funds may be restricted to specific activities or unrestricted. In some cases, funds that were originally restricted were changed to unrestricted at the request of the CFSCI so that the monies could be used for CFSCI operating expenses other than those associated with grant administration. Through 2008, some of the non-Federal funds received include:

- 2003: $200,000 from Pacific Gas & Electric for the development of an updated "Fire Safe Inside and Out" video [This video was released under the title "Controlling Nature's Wrath"]
- 2003: $2,500 from Chemco
- 2003: $3000 from Thermo Gel
- 2006: $100,000 from Allstate to conduct three media and safety fairs and to provide capacity building grants to several local fire safe councils
- 2007: $5,000 from Farmers Insurance
- 2008: $250,000 from State Farm Insurance, with $150,000 to go to CAL FIRE for hydration packs and fire shelter holsters. The CFSCI will act as the fiscal agent for the CAL FIRE funds. Uses for the remaining $100,000 include newsletters, regional public relations and media workshops, and distribution of excess copies of the "Controlling Nature's Wrath" DVD to local FSCs.
- 2008: $150,000 grant from Farmers Insurance for 4–5 workshops on effective partnerships, including partnering with Farmers, for fire prevention activities.
- 2011: $4,000 grant from Pacific Gas & Electric for the complete redesign and update of the CFSC organizational website, among other uses.

==== The Million Who Dare to Care Program ====
In August 2007, the CFSCI announced the Million Who Dare to Care Program. The announcement said: "Join "The Million Who Dare to Care" program of the California Fire Safe Council to help raise funds to provide services to homeowners and local Fire Safe Councils for fuels reduction around homes and in our communities." The flyer stated "Your gift of just one dollar means the California Fire Safe Council can help homeowners prepare ahead of time for a wildfire." Thus the program was publicly positioned as a funding source for community fire safe projects.

However, internally the CFSCI Board of Directors appears to have considered the funds as being for its use as a source of unrestricted funds. The minutes from the August 2, 2007 Board meeting read: "Dr. Horne [the CFSCI Treasurer] asked the Board to recognize the efforts of Ms. Rightmyer in conceiving of and implementing the "Million Who Dare to Care" fundraising program. ... Ms. Rightmyer ... commented that these are unrestricted funds..."

As of September 2011 there has been no public accounting of how much money was raised or how these funds were used.

==== Attempts to acquire state funding for the Grants Clearinghouse ====
While local units of CAL FIRE, which is a State agency, often provide "in-kind" matches for federal grants obtained by their local fire safe councils, the State of California as of May 2018 has yet to supply a formal funding stream through the Grants Clearinghouse for community fire safe projects, such as is provided by Federal agencies.

== See also ==
- Fire safe councils
- Fire Safe California Grants Clearinghouse
