= Women's Timber Corps =

British forestry workers in the Second World War

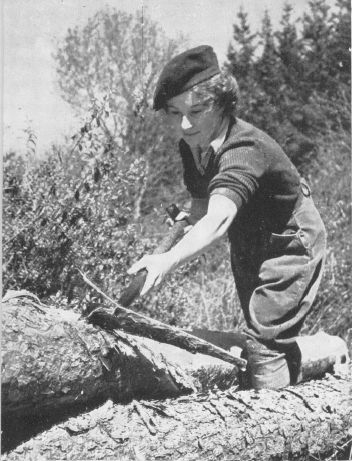
- A member of the Women's Timber Corps stripping bark from a felled tree to be used as a telegraph pole.
- Abbreviation: WTC
- Established: 1942
- Dissolved: 1946
- Region served: United Kingdom
- Staff: 6,000 – 13,000 (1943)

The Women's Timber Corps (WTC) was a British civilian organisation created during the Second World War to work in forestry, replacing men who had left to join the armed forces. Women who joined the WTC were commonly known as Lumber Jills or Lumberjills.

== Formation ==
Formed in 1942, the origins of the WTC go back to the First World War, when the Women's Timber Service had been formed to help with the war effort. In 1940 to solve a labour shortage and an increased demand for timber the Forestry Commission started recruiting women both as forestry workers but also to work in sawmills. In 1942 responsibility passed from the Forestry Commission to the Home Timber Production Department of the Ministry of Supply and the 1,200 women already working for the Forestry Commission or in forestry jobs as part of their service in the Women's Land Army (WLA) became part of the new corps.

== Organisation ==
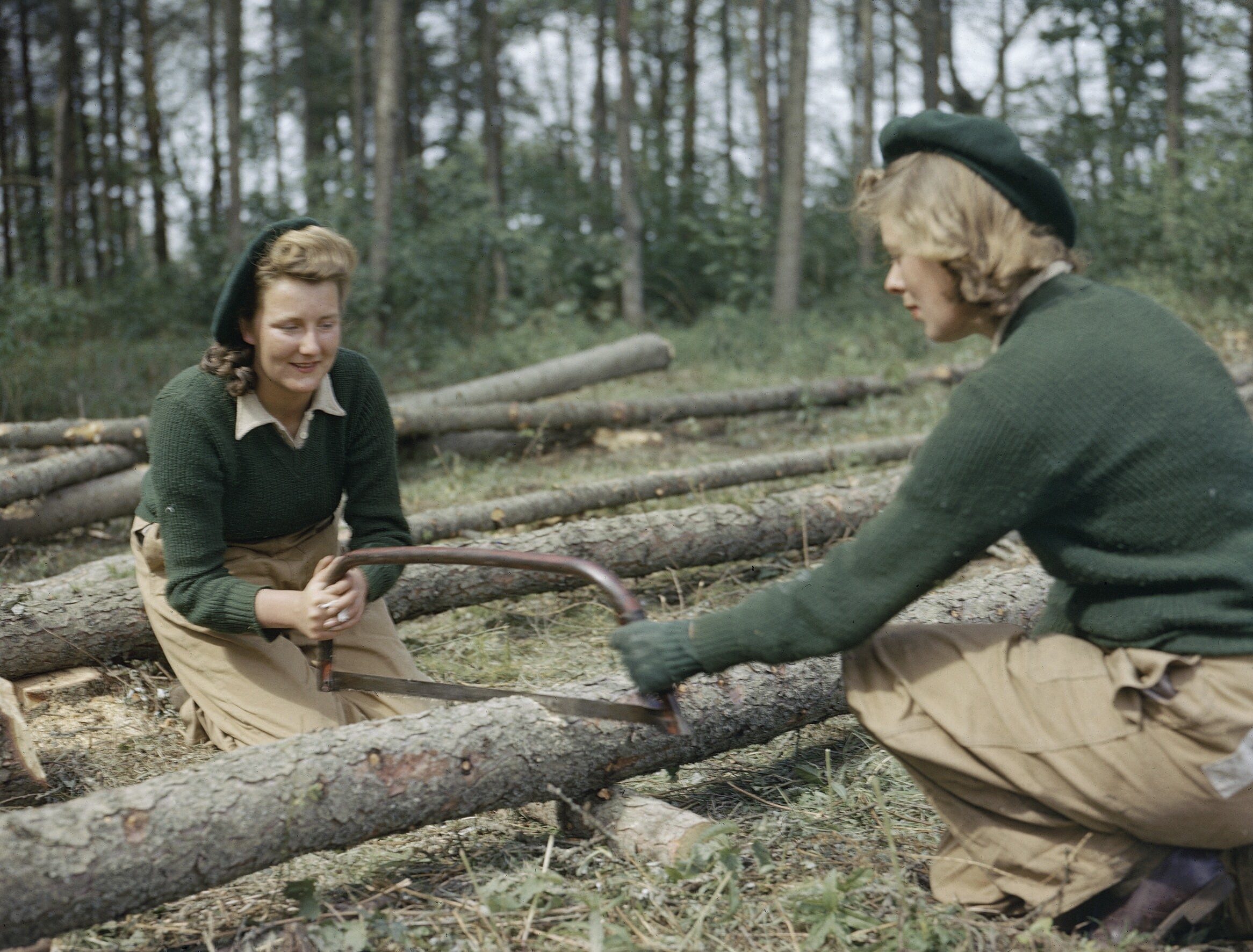
Two members of the WTC cutting pit props during their basic training at Culford

As many of the women who had joined the Forestry Commission came from the WLA, the WLA took over the administration and recruitment for the WTC and although the WTC was officially part of the WLA it retained a separate identity. The uniforms were identical except that the WTC replaced the WLA felt hat for a beret and wore the WTC badge.

A full set of kit consisted of:

- 2 green jerseys
- 2 pairs of riding breeches
- 2 overall coats
- 2 pairs of dungarees
- 6 pairs of woollen knee socks
- 3 beige knit shirts
- 1 pair boots
- 1 pair of brown shoes
- 1 pair of gumboots or boots with leggings
- 1 green beret
- 1 melton overcoat
- 1 oilskin or mackintosh
- 2 towels
- a green armlet and a metal badge
- a bakelite hat badge

Many of the women rarely wore the full uniform and instead they wore what was comfortable and/or practical to work in.

The corps was divided into nine geographic areas responsible for the work and welfare of the women in that area. Accommodation ranged from purpose built hutted camps, through small hotels and hostels to private billets. Never as large as the WLA, the WTC did have a maximum strength estimated at being between 6,000 and 13,000 at its peak size in 1943 working throughout the United Kingdom. This compared with over 51,000 men and 48,000 Italian and German prisoners of war working in forestry by 1945 The corps was a mobile organisation so the workers could be posted anywhere and moved frequently as work required. One of the major difficulties the women faced was in finding accommodation as in most cases they had to find their own accommodation and many householders were reluctant to take the women in as they considered them dirty or held other prejudices against women workers. One woman recalled that she stayed at over 80 different billets in two years.

== Duties ==
The work of the WTC included all the jobs involved with forestry including felling, snedding, loading, crosscutting, driving tractors, trucks, working with horses and operating sawmills. A more specialist skill was measuring which was the job of assessing the amount of timber in a tree, measuring the amount of timber felled, surveying new woodlands and identifying trees for felling.

Initial training consisted of a four to six week course at one of the Corps depots at Culford, Hereford, Lydney or Wetherby before being posted elsewhere. The work was heavy and arduous but there was a grudging acceptance from farmers and foresters that the women of the WTC were as good as the men they had replaced.

Pay ranged from 35 to 46 shillings per week for treefellers (equivalent to £70-90 in 2025) with measurers earning more at about 50 shillings per week (equivalent to £100 in 2025). The women were paid piece-work rather than a set wage as paid to the women of the WLA, this resulted in the average WTC wage being higher than the WLA. The overall wages though was lower than the national average of just over 62 shillings per week (equivalent to £120 in 2025) being earned by women in industry during the later war years.

The pay rates were much less than the rates paid to men for the same work. A post-war report on forestry rates of pay showed that in 1944 male forestry workers classed as general labourers were paid 72 shillings per week compared to the pay for the WTC of 56 shillings per week.

Towards the end of the war some of the women were considered skilled enough to be posted to Germany to help salvage the sawmills there.

== Disbandment and subsequent recognition ==
The WTC was disbanded in 1946 when each member was awarded a personal letter signed by Queen Elizabeth. Other than this no recognition of the WTC (or the WLA) was made and it was not until 2000 that former members of the WTC were allowed to take part in the annual Remembrance Sunday parade in London. In 2007, the Department for Environment, Food and Rural Affairs announced that all surviving members of the WTC would be entitled to wear a new badge to commemorate their service in the Corps.

In 2012, the Forestry Commission marked the 70th anniversary of the WTC. On Remembrance Day 2012, BBC Countryfile broadcast a tribute to the work of the WTC with veteran members, filmed in the Forest of Dean.

== National memorial ==
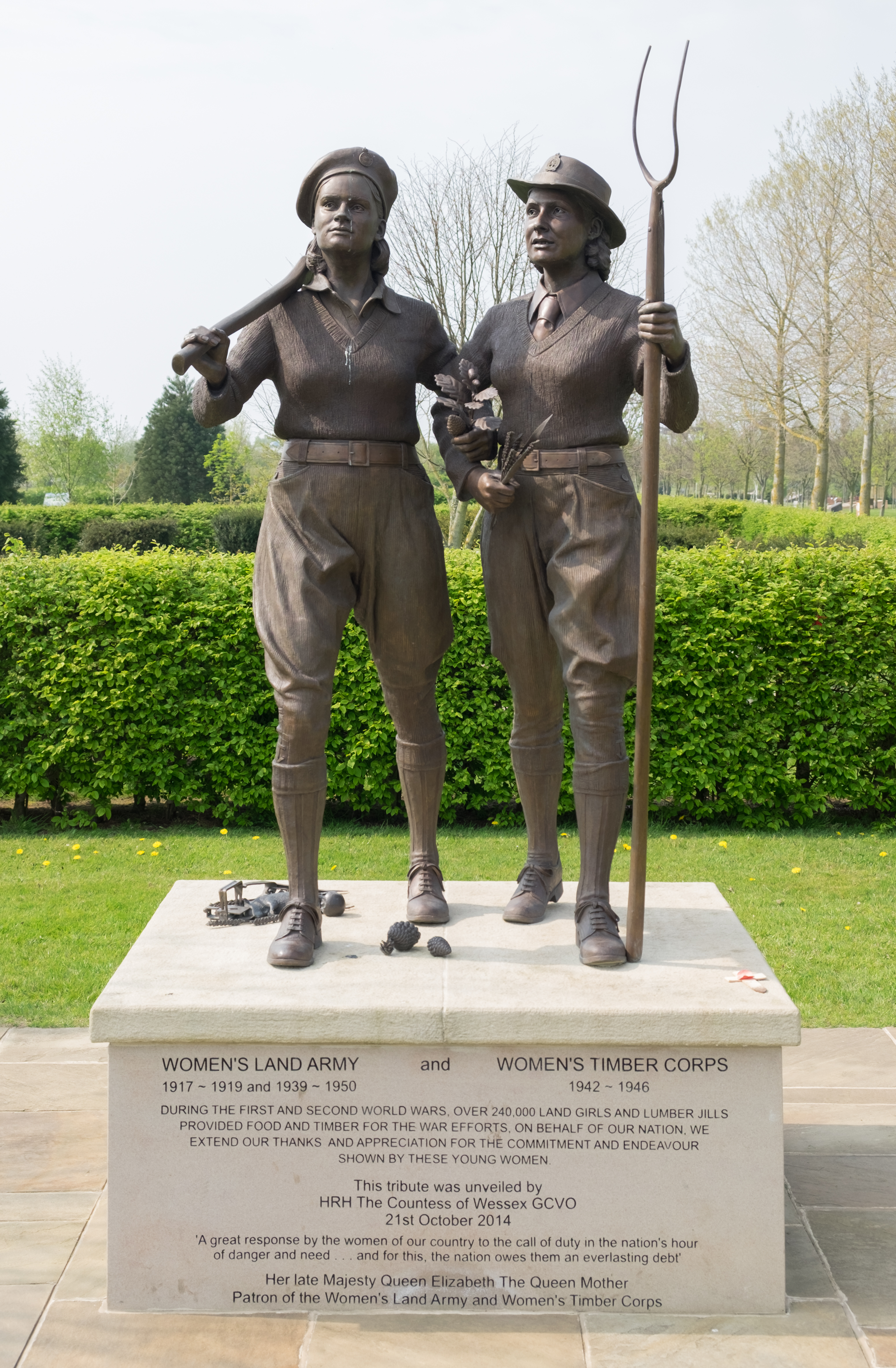
Memorial at the National Memorial Arboretum

On 10 October 2007 Forestry Commission Scotland unveiled a national memorial to the women of the WTC in the form of a life size bronze sculpture by Malcolm Robertson. The statue is in the Queen Elizabeth Forest Park near Aberfoyle, Stirling.

In October 2014, a memorial statue to both the Women's Land Army and the Women's Timber Corps was formally unveiled at the National Memorial Arboretum in Alrewas, Staffordshire.
