= Defensible space =

Defensible space may refer to:

- Defensible space theory, a concept of influencing negative social behavior through architectural and urban design
- Defensible space (fire control), referring to planning methods for prevention and control of fires
