= Limbing =

Process of removing branches from a tree trunk

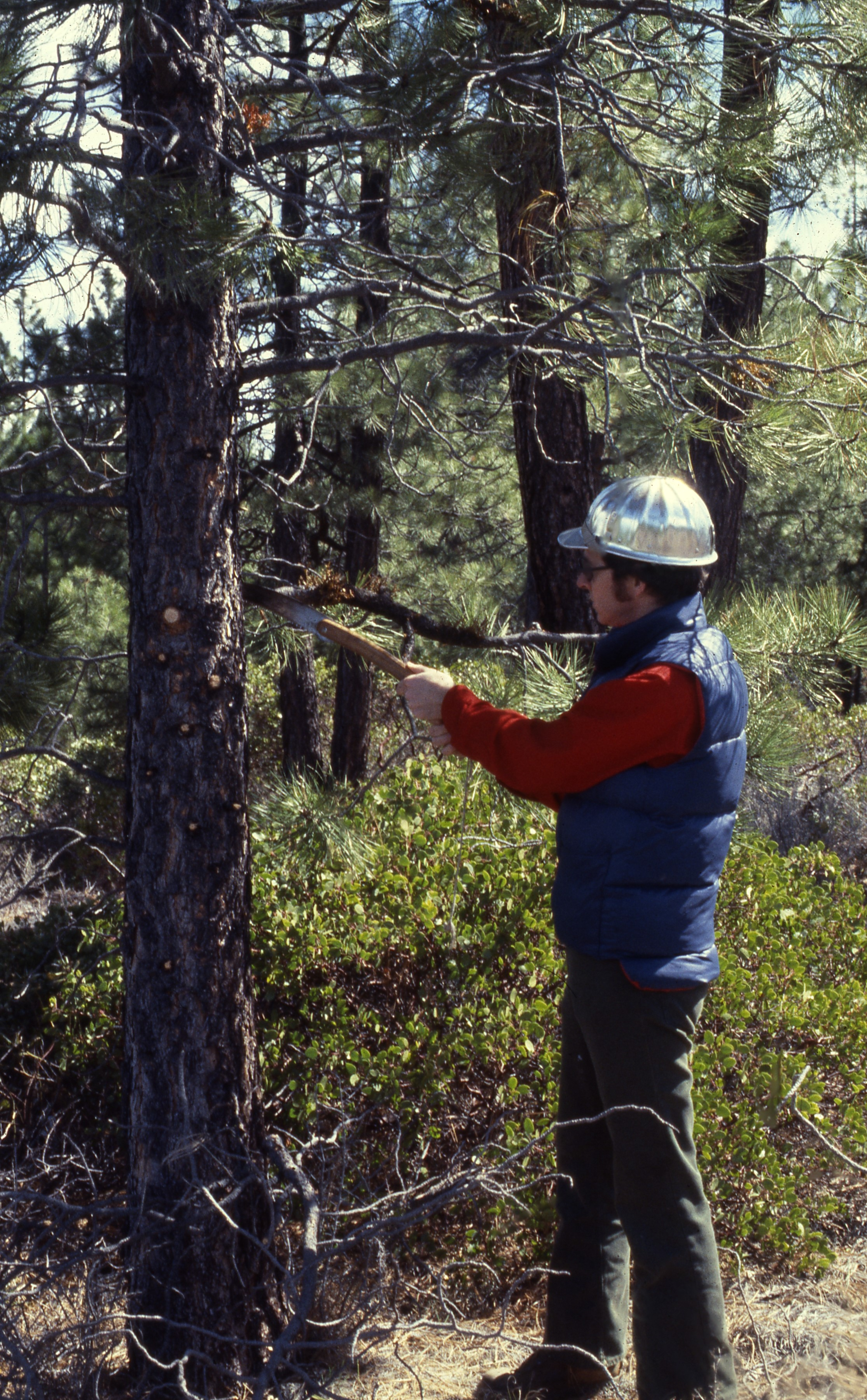
Limbing a pine tree with a manual pruning saw

Limbing or delimbing is the process of removing branches from a standing or fallen tree trunk.

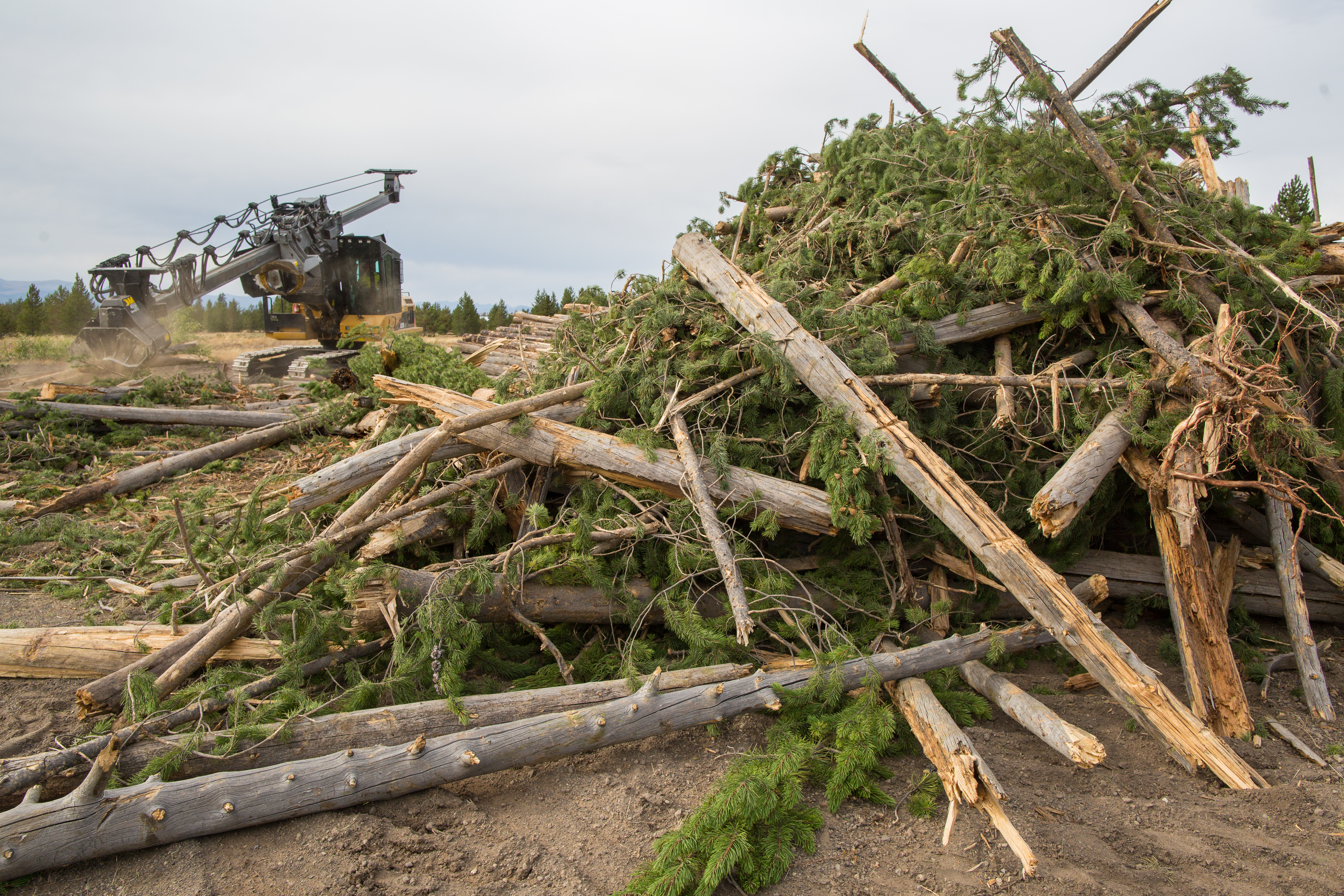
This truck known as a Delimber is used for limbing and saves time.

In logging, limbing follows felling. Limbing plays a role in fire prevention by removing branches from live trees that can otherwise serve as part of a fuel ladder allowing a fire to climb from the ground into the tree canopy. A California fire prevention guide recommends to "Remove all tree branches at least 6 feet [1.8 meters] from the ground" and "Allow extra vertical space between shrubs and trees."

In British English, limbing can be synonymous with snedding. Alternatively, limbing can be used to describe the operation on larger branches, and snedding on smaller.

== In logging ==
Options for cutting off the branches include chain saws, harvesters, stroke delimbers and others. Limbing can happen at the stump in log/tree length systems and cut-to-length systems or at the landing in whole-tree logging.

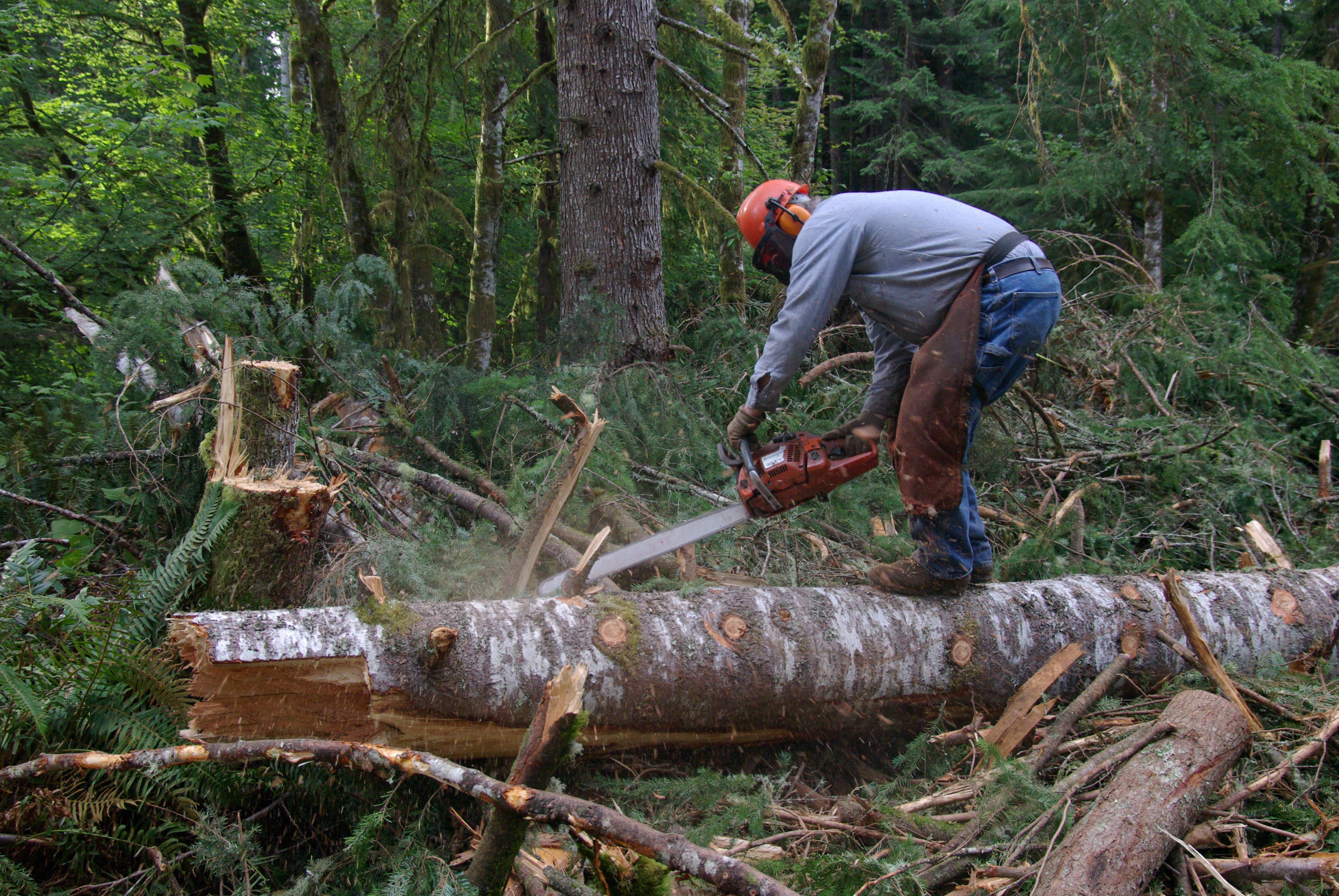
Chainsaw limbing

When the tree is lying on the ground, branches may be storing enormous potential energy through mechanical strain. When a branch is cut, often with a chain saw, this energy can be released suddenly and the branch can jump dangerously. In addition, a branch may be supporting the tree, and the tree can fall or roll when the branch is cut. For these reasons, limbing is a skilled operation requiring careful safety planning.

== See also ==
- Axe
- Chainsaw
- Felling
- Fuel ladder
- Hewing
- Logging
- Log bucking
- Feller buncher
