= Fire blanket =

Sheet of fire retardant material used to smother fires

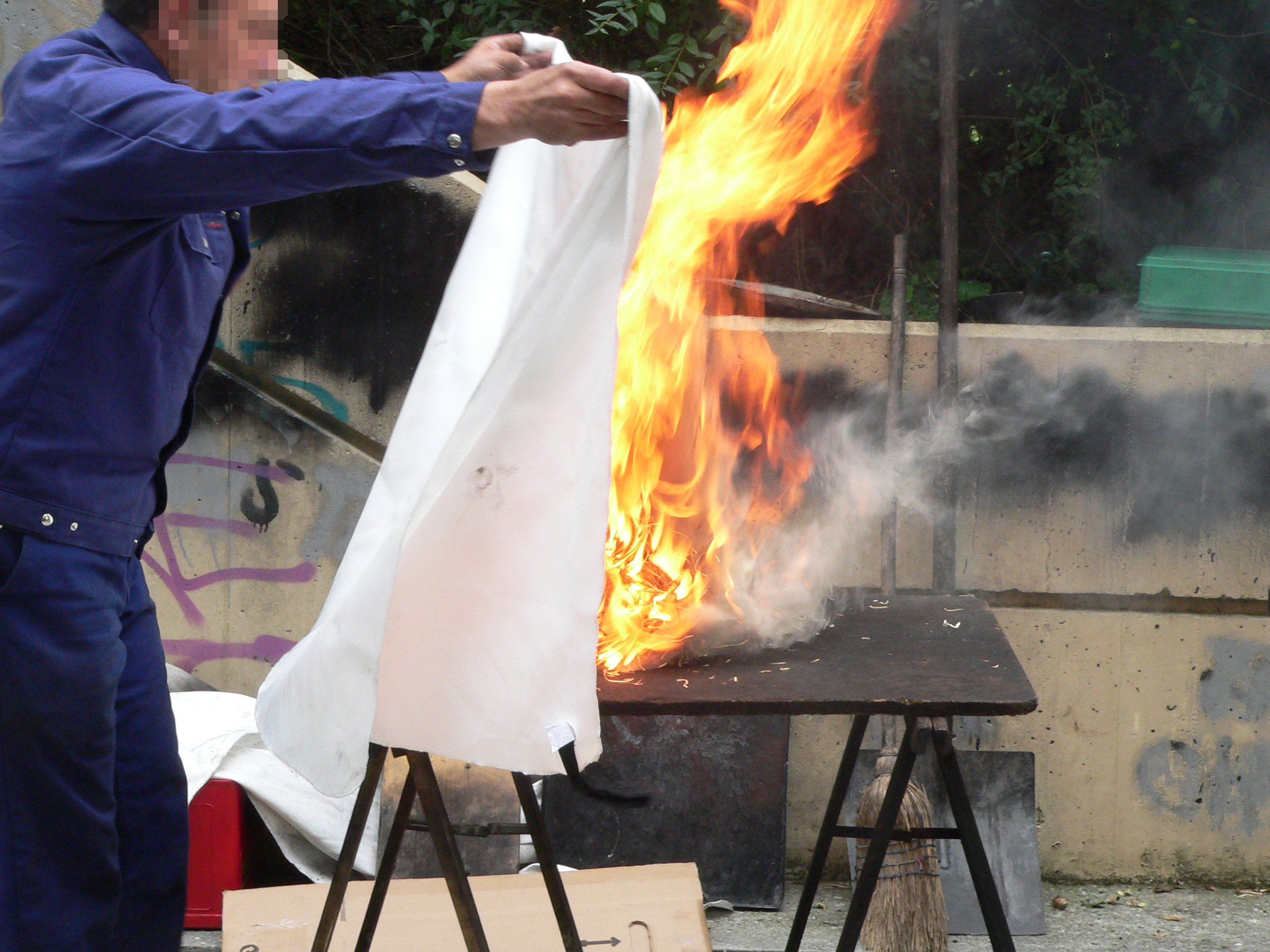
Fire blanket being used to smother flames

Extinguishing of a straw fire with a fire blanket

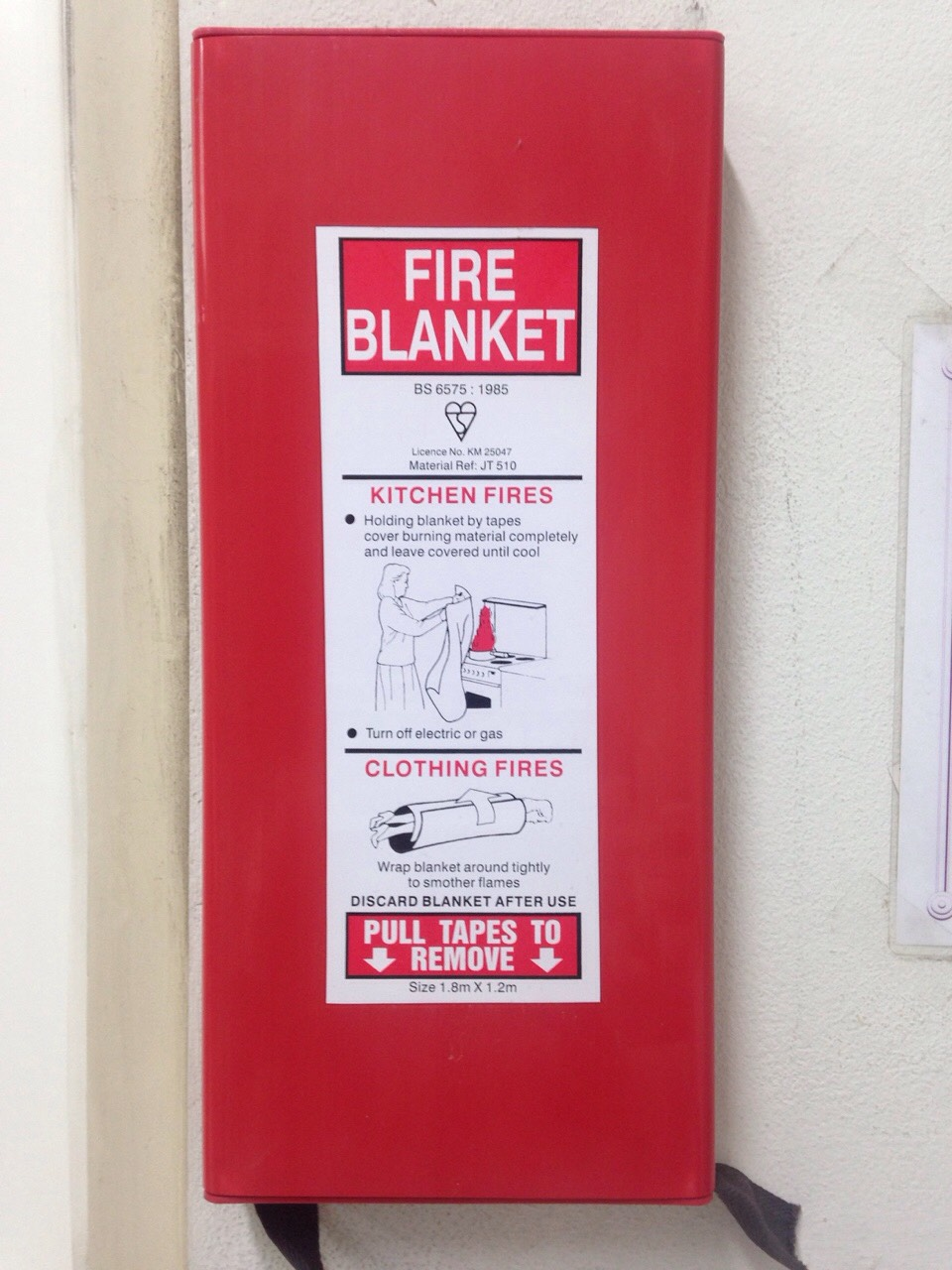
Fire blanket cabinet

A fire blanket is a safety device designed to extinguish incipient (starting) fires. It consists of a sheet of a fire retardant material that is placed over a fire in order to smother it.

Small fire blankets, such as for use in kitchens and around the home are usually made of glass fiber and sometimes kevlar, and are folded into a quick-release contraption for ease of storage. Larger fire blankets, for use in laboratory and industrial situations, are often made of wool – sometimes treated with a flame retardant chemical such as hexafluorozirconate and zirconium acetate. These blankets are usually mounted in vertical quick-release containers so that they can be easily pulled out and wrapped round a person whose clothes are on fire.

Fire blankets, along with fire extinguishers, are fire safety items that can be useful in case of a fire. These nonflammable materials are stable in temperatures up to 1300 °C for Nextel ceramic fibres, 1200 °C for glass fibers, 480 °C for Kevlar, and 570 °C for wool. These are useful in smothering fires by reducing the amount of oxygen available to the fire. Due to its simplicity, a fire blanket may be more helpful for someone who is inexperienced with fire extinguishers.

== Dangers ==
=== Asbestos in old blankets ===
Some older fire blankets were made of woven asbestos fibres and are not NFPA rated. This can pose a hazard during the decommissioning of old equipment.

=== Extinguishing oil/fat fires ===
After initial investigation in 2013, and later in 2014, the Netherlands Food and Consumer Product Safety Authority issued a statement that fire blankets should never be used to extinguish an oil/fat fire such as a chip pan fire, even if the icons or text on the blanket indicates the blanket may be used in such a case. This includes fire blankets which have been tested according to BS EN 1869. In the investigation out of the 22 tested fire blankets, 16 of the fire blankets themselves caught fire. In the other 6 the fire reignited when the blanket was removed after 17 minutes. The Dutch Fire Burn foundation reported several accidents involving the use of fire blankets when extinguishing oil/fat fires. Consumers may send in their existing fire blankets, which will then receive a sticker stating 'niet geschikt voor olie- en vetbranden' ("not suitable for oil and grease fires"). New products will have this text printed, rather than stickered.

== Operation ==
For a fire to burn, all three elements of the fire triangle must be present: heat, fuel and oxygen. The fire blanket is used to cut off the oxygen supply to the fire, thereby putting it out. The fire blanket must be sealed closely to a solid surface around the fire. Fire blankets usually have two pull down tails visible from outside the packaging. The user should place one hand on each tag and pull down simultaneously removing the blanket from the bag. The tails are located near the top of the fire blanket which allows the top lip of the fire blanket to fold back over the users' hands, protecting them from heat and direct contact burns. Cover the fire with the fire blanket, and it will help cut the oxygen supply and extinguish the fire. You can also use this method when a part of the body catches fire. The fire blanket must be sealed closely to a solid surface around the fire.

=== Electric vehicles fires ===
EV fires can be extremely difficult to extinguish as lithium batteries can self-reignite. "Up to 150 000 liters of water needed to put out a fire in an electric car ...Teslas may take up to 30,000-40,000 gallons of water, maybe even more, to extinguish the battery pack once it starts burning..." However, a typical larger fire truck carries only a few thousand liters of water.

A fire blanket is so large that a burning vehicle can be completely covered with it (typical size is e.g. 6 m x 9 m to cover large SUVs) - and are extremely heat-resistant (1000 to 1600+ degrees). Also one has to consider the difference between allowed short-term peak temperature and long-term temperature.

By putting on a fire blanket, the flames are supposed to be smothered. In a fire test with the fire brigade conducted by the General German Automobile Club, were able to see how the fire blanket actually significantly delays the development of the fire and thus increases the fire brigade's scope for action.

The use of the fire blanket can prevent the fire from spreading to adjacent vehicles or surrounding objects. In addition, the removal of an electric vehicle that has been involved in an accident or has been extinguished can be secured with a fire blanket. Another field of application of the blanket is the quarantine of crashed electric cars at an accident site of towing companies or workshops.

== Maintenance ==
The Fire Industry Association (FIA) publish a "Code of Practice for the Commissioning and Maintenance of Fire Blankets Manufactured to BS EN 1869". The FIA's code of practice recommends that the responsible person ensures that such fire blankets are subject to annual maintenance by a competent service provider. It also recommends that consideration should be given to the replacement of fire blankets after seven years from the date of commissioning (or as otherwise specified by the fire blanket's manufacturer).

== See also ==
- Welding blanket
