= Firebreak =

Gap in vegetation that acts as a barrier against wildfires

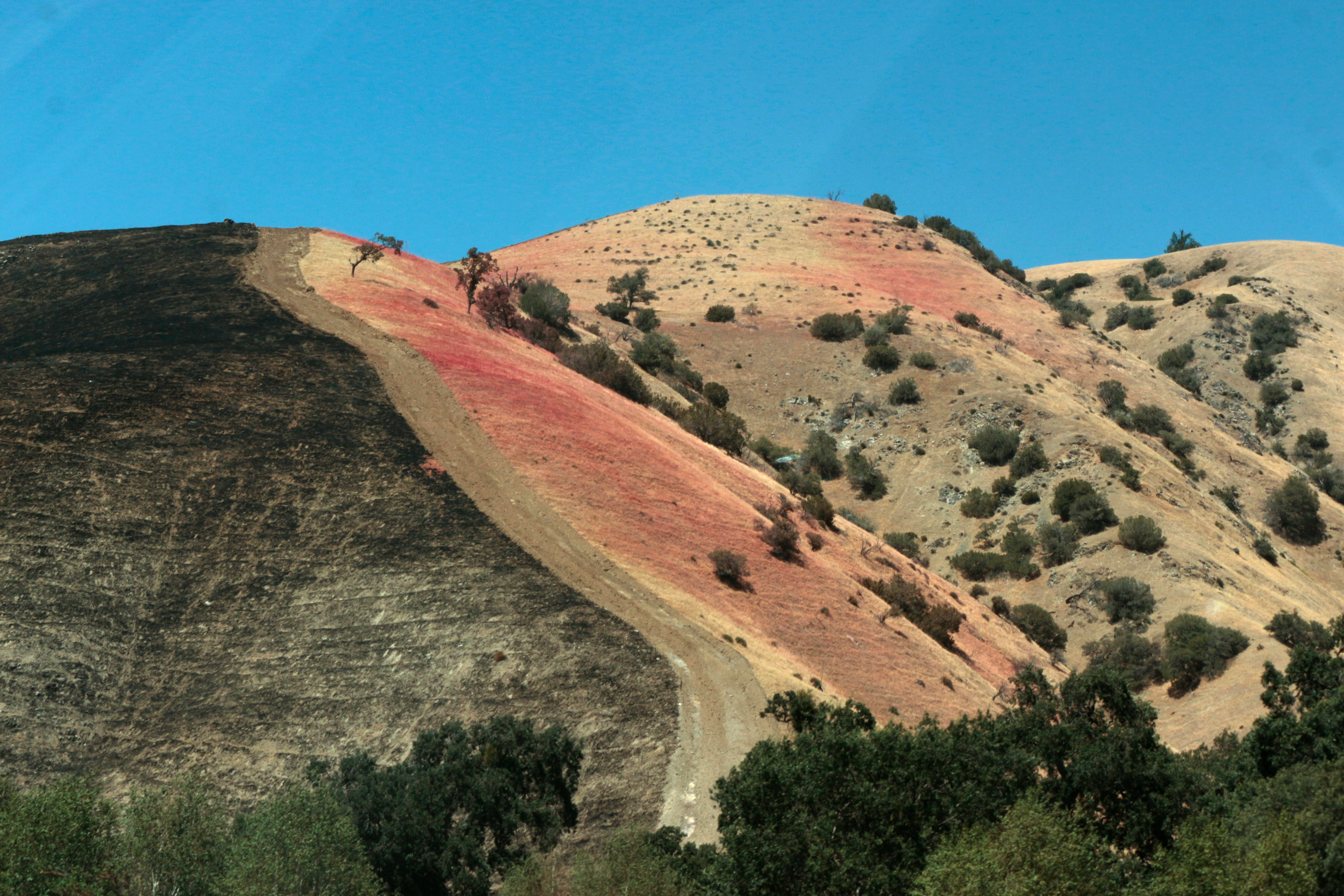
Red fire retardant dispersed aerially onto brush adjoining a firebreak during the Tumbleweed Fire in California, in July 2021; while vegetation to the left of the firebreak has completely burned, everything to its right was protected.

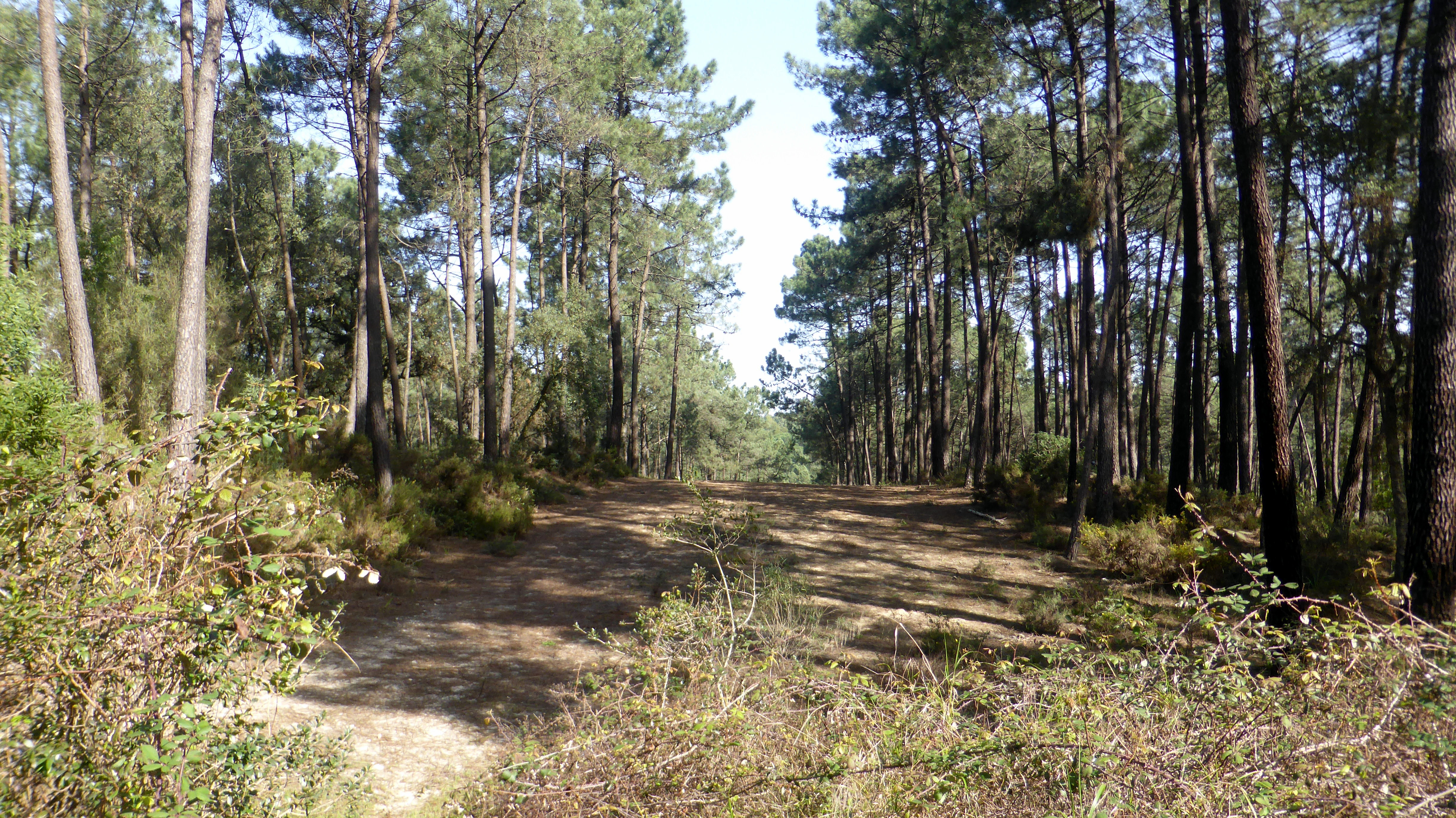
A firebreak on the Setúbal Peninsula in Portugal

A firebreak or fireline (also called a doubletrack, fuel break, fireroad and firetrail in Australia) is a nonflammable gap in vegetation or other combustible material that acts as a barrier to slow or stop the progress of a bushfire or wildfire. A firebreak may occur naturally where there is an absence of vegetation or "fuel", such as a river, lake or canyon. Firebreaks may also be man-made, and many of these also serve as roads, such as logging roads, four-wheel drive trails, secondary roads, or highways.

== Overview ==
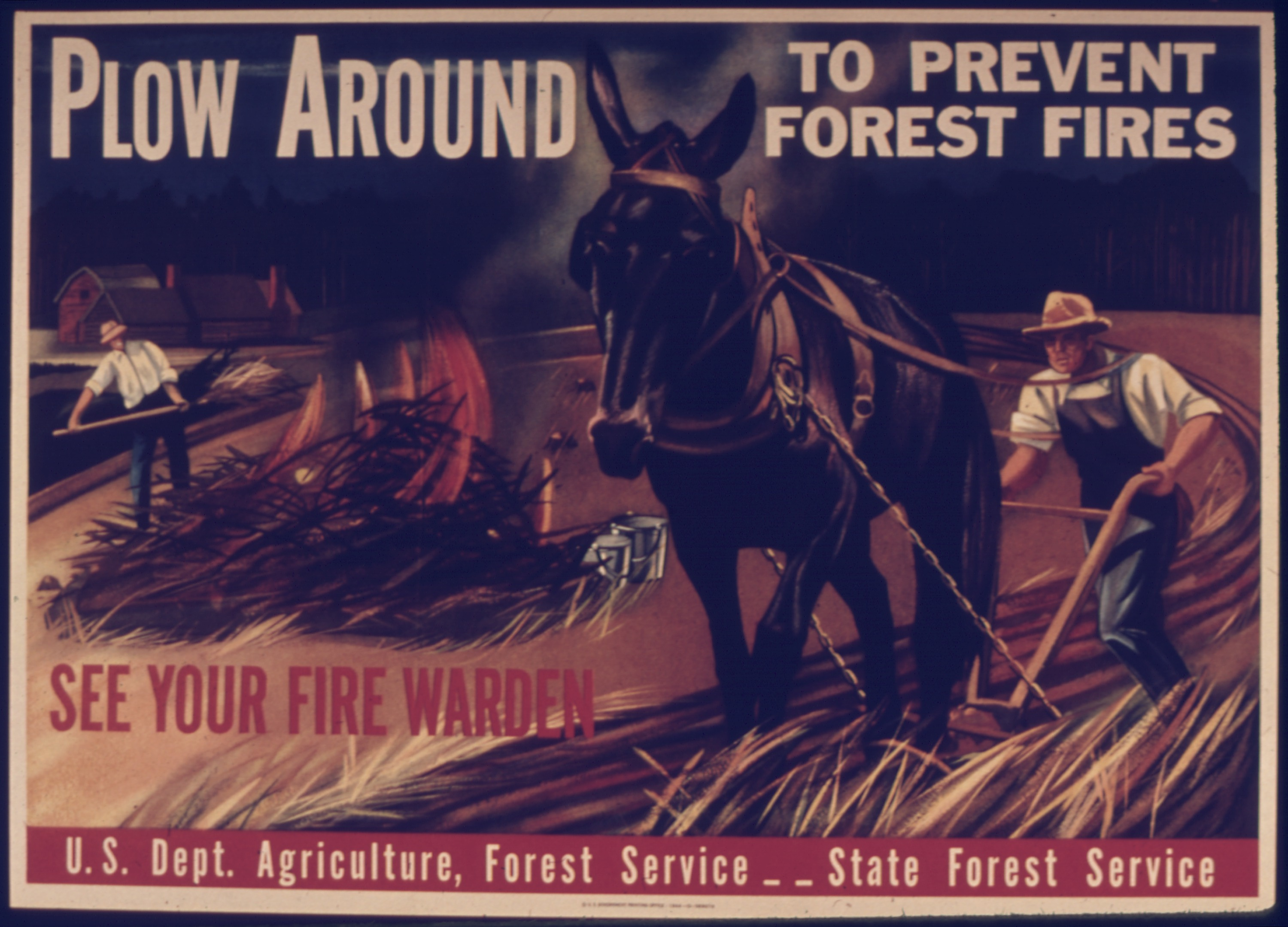
A poster promoting plowing to create a fire break

A video explaining firebreaks and contingency lines during the North Complex Fire

In the construction of a firebreak, the primary goal is to remove deadwood and undergrowth down to mineral soil. Various methods may be used to accomplish this initially and to maintain this condition. Ideally, the firebreak will be constructed and maintained according to the established practices of sustainable forestry and fire protection engineering, also known as best management practices (BMP). The general goals are to maximize the effectiveness of the firebreak at slowing the spread of wildfire, and, by using firebreaks of sufficient size and density, to reduce the ultimate size of wildfires. Additional goals are to maintain the ecology of the forest and to reduce the impact of wildfires on air pollution and the global climate, and to balance the costs and benefits of the various projects.

These goals can be achieved through the use of appropriate operating practices, many of which can be potentially mutually beneficial to all. In many cases, it may be useful for firebreak upkeep to be maintained along with the harvesting of forestry products, such as lumber and biomass fuel, since the objectives are fundamentally related, in that the basic goals are to remove material from the forest. Furthermore, if done properly, the value of these products can significantly offset the cost of maintaining the firebreak. In addition, these commercial industries and small businesses are helped by a reduction in the property damages caused by wildfires, and reduced risk of investment. The biomass material that is not suitable for dimensioned lumber is suitable to make woodchips for the paper industry and the energy industry. Larger trees are sometimes left in place within some types of firebreaks, to shade the forest floor and reduce the rate of fuel accumulation, and to enhance the landscaping in recreational and inhabited locations.

=== Prevalence ===
Forested areas often contain vast networks of firebreaks. Some communities are also using firebreaks as part of their city planning strategy. An example is the city of Revelstoke, British Columbia, which includes firebreaks in their Community Wildfire Protection Plan.

=== Effectiveness ===
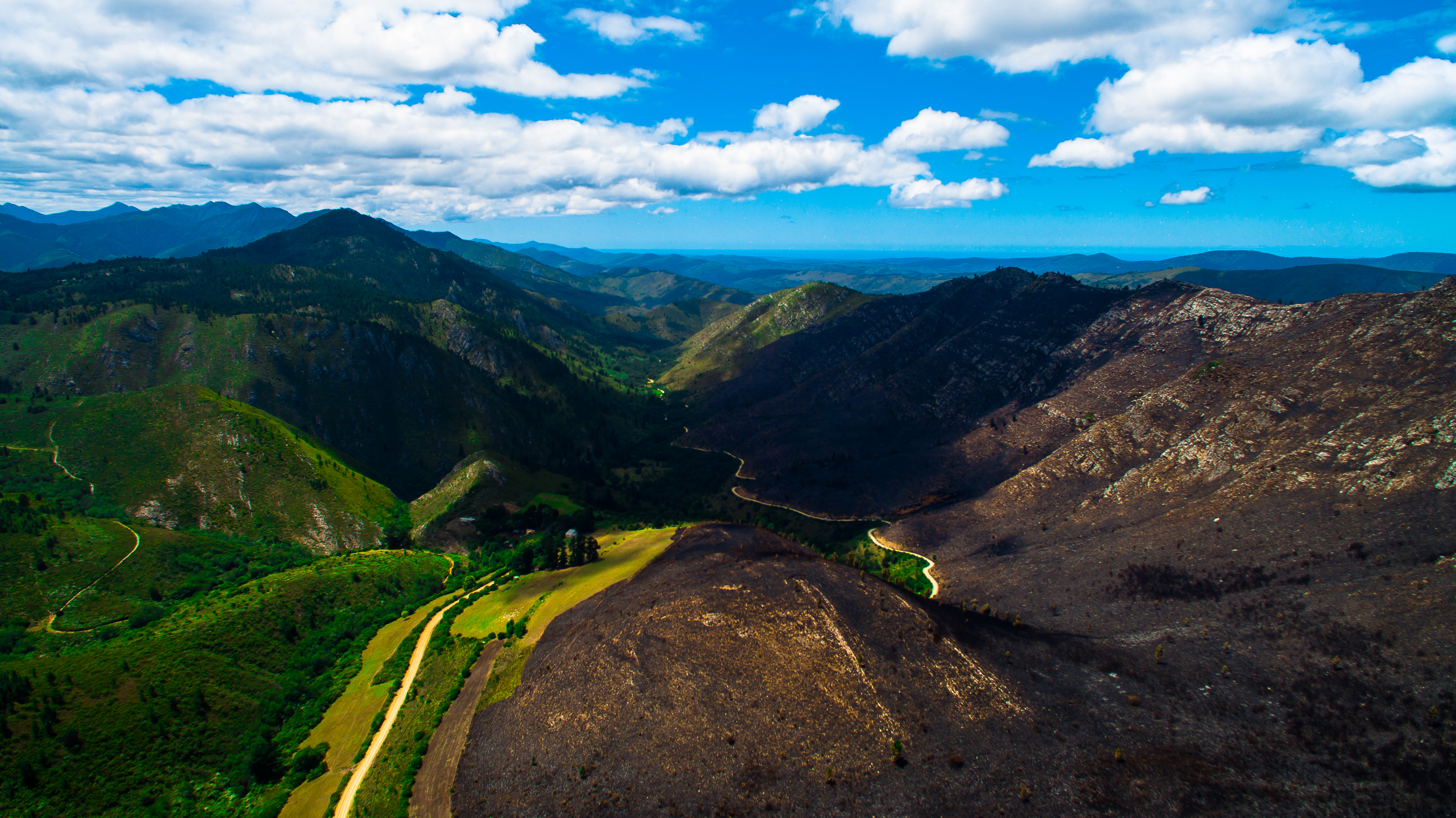
By comparing the burnt (right) and unburnt (left) sides of a dirt road in South Africa after a major veldfire (grassland fire) the effectiveness of the road in acting as a firebreak can be seen.

Depending on the environmental conditions, and the relative effectiveness of a given firebreak, firebreaks often have to be backed up with other firefighting efforts. Even then, it is still sometimes possible for fire to spread across a seemingly impenetrable divide. For example, during the Cedar Fire of 2003, strong Santa Ana winds had blown enough burning embers across a 10-lane section of Interstate 15 to ignite the vegetation on the other side. During the 1988 fires in Yellowstone National Park, hot embers managed to cross the Lewis Canyon, a natural canyon up to a mile wide and 600 feet (180 m) deep. In Australia, firebreaks are less effective against eucalyptus forest fires, since intense fires in tinder-dry eucalyptus forest spread through flying embers, which can be carried by the winds to trigger new blazes several kilometres away. In 2019, goats deployed to graze the nearby flammable vegetation and create a firebreak helped save the Ronald Reagan Presidential Library and Museum and Getty Museum from California wildfires.

== Green firebreak ==
Green firebreaks are lines of low flammability vegetation, planted to slow down fire. Among their advantages are lower cost, biodiversity and reduced erosion.

== History ==
Due to a lack of a standardized firefighting force at the time, the Great Fire of London in 1666 instead saw the Tower of London garrison using gunpowder and fire hooks in a widespread, ad-hoc firebreaking campaign across Central London. Historians believe this to have been one of the major contributing factors to the eventual defeat of the inferno.

The world's most expensive firebreak was created when part of Van Ness Avenue in San Francisco was dynamited to stop the spread of fire resulting from the 1906 San Francisco earthquake. Firefighting after an earthquake can be especially challenging, because an earthquake can cause water mains to rupture, resulting in a complete loss of water pressure.

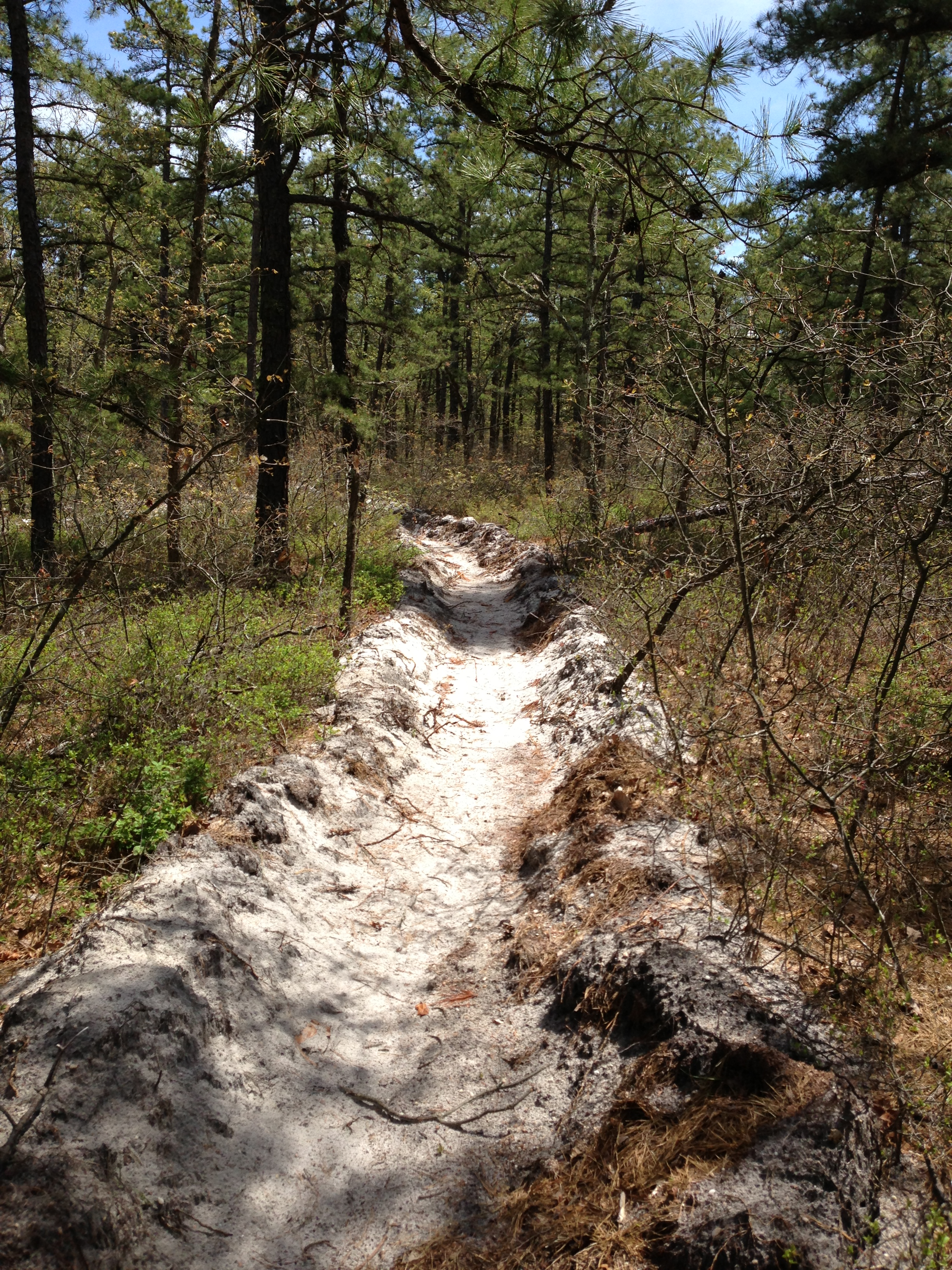
Firebreak in the Brendan T. Byrne State Forest in New Jersey's Pine Barrens ecoregion

== See also ==
- Fire trail
- Controlled burn
- Defensible space (fire control)
- Fire ecology
- Firefighting
- Firewall (construction)
- Fuel ladder
- Glossary of wildfire terms
- Wildfire suppression
