= Welding blanket =

Welding safety equipment

A welding blanket is a piece of safety equipment designed to protect equipment and the welder while welding. A welding blanket typically consists of a layer of flexible protective material containing unexpanded vermiculite and inorganic heat resistant fibrous material. When contacted by spatter of molten metal during a welding process the material protects the surrounding areas by maintaining the structural integrity of the blanket. Many modern welding blankets are made of flame retardant fiberglass and can stand working temperatures ranging from 300 to 2,500 degrees Fahrenheit. Historically welding blankets were made of woven asbestos, however due to safety concerns have been widely discontinued.
