= Fuel ladder =

Vegetation that can spread fire

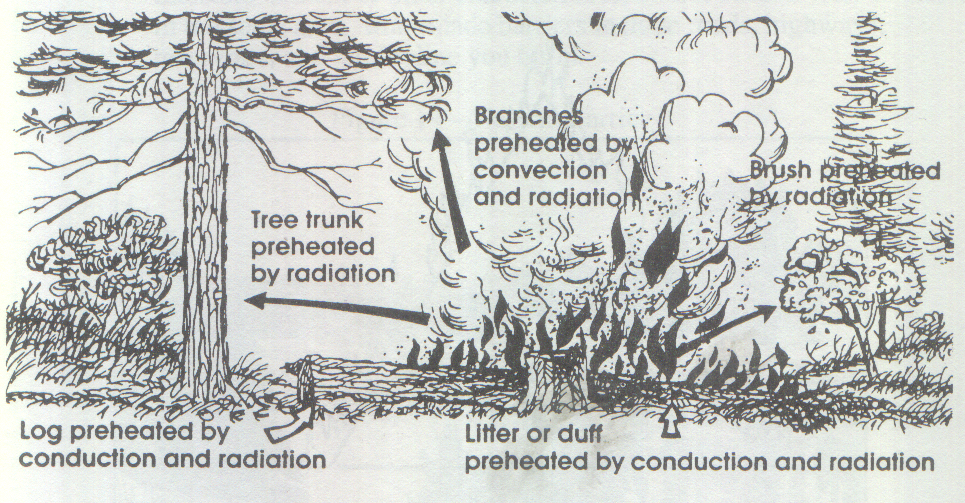
Illustration from U.S. government publication, Introduction to Wildland Fire Behavior (S-190), showing the fuel ladder

A fuel ladder or ladder fuel is a firefighting term for live or dead vegetation that allows a fire to climb up from the landscape or forest floor into the tree canopy. Common ladder fuels include tall grasses, shrubs, and tree branches, living and dead. The removal of fuel ladders is part of defensible space 'firescaping' practices.

== Fire precautions ==
Potential fuel ladders should be removed to reduce the risk of fire bridging the gap to the canopy. To remove the ladder requires pruning any low limbs up to a minimum of 2.5 m (8 ft), and potentially as high as 5 m (16 ft). The required height depends on how low the branch tips hang, the steepness of slope, and the height and spacing of other nearby vegetation.

The desired result is to create a situation in which a low-burning fire could burn to the trunk of a tree, which is protected by its bark, without having thinner, more flammable branches, leaves or needles within easy reach of the fire.

== Other fuel ladders ==
Apart from tree limbs, anything that would help that fire move up into the tree canopy is a fuel ladder. This includes shrubs and even tall grass or weeds. Non-vegetation fuel sources such as woodpiles, wooden fenceposts and structures should also be considered.

The intent is to maintain a break in vertical and horizontal continuity so that, if for example a woodpile caught fire, it would not be positioned next to shrubs or directly under trees that could then easily catch fire.

== See also ==
- Fire control
- Fire ecology
- Limbing
- Wildfire
- Wildfire suppression
