= Snedding =

Removal of side shoots and buds from the length of a branch or shoot

Snedding is the process of stripping the side shoots and buds from the length of a branch or shoot, usually of a tree or woody shrub. This process is most commonly performed during hedge laying and prior to the felling of trees on plantations ready for cropping.

The verb 'sned', analogous to today's limbing, has also been used by woodcutters in Scotland to refer to the process of removing branches from felled trees. Whether using an axe, a chainsaw or a billhook, the relative difficulty of snedding was a key measure of the difficulty of the job as a whole.

The word comes from the Scandinavian snäddare, meaning a smooth log via the Old English snǣdan.

Snedding can also describe a form of pruning when only some shoots will be removed, or when removing the leafy top from root crops (particularly turnips).
