= Fire Safe California Grants Clearinghouse =

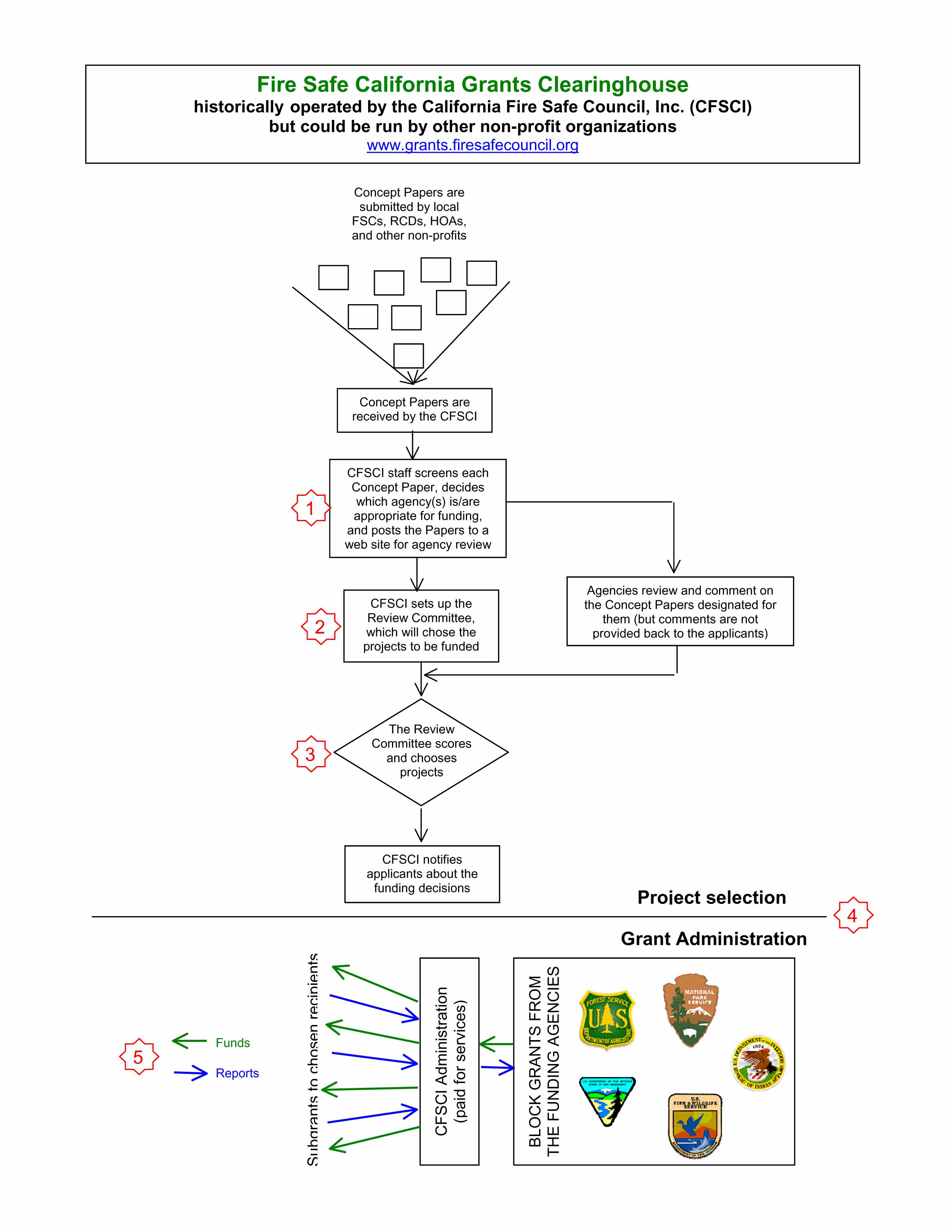
Elements of the Fire Safe California Grants Clearinghouse)

The Fire Safe California Grants Clearinghouse (AKA Grants Clearinghouse) was created by the members of the California Fire Alliance (now called preventwildfireca.org) in order to facilitate the process of applying for Federal grants to do wildfire prevention projects on private lands in California. This process is also referred to as "one-stop shopping."

The Clearinghouse is administered by the California Fire Safe Council, Inc. (CFSCI) on behalf of the members of the Fire Alliance. For these services, the CFSCI receives reimbursement or direct and indirect expenses related to grant administration. The CFSCI is a 501(c)(3) California non-profit corporation headquartered in McClellan, California.

== Reasons for development of the Grants Clearinghouse ==
=== New funding ===
In response to the wildland fires of 2000, President Bill Clinton requested, and the Secretaries of the Department of the Interior and Department of Agriculture submitted, a September 8, 2000, report, Managing the Impact of Wildfires on Communities and the Environment, A Report to the President In Response to the Wildfires of 2000. This report, its accompanying budget request, Congressional direction for substantial new appropriations for wildland fire management, resulting action plans and agency strategies and the Western Governors Association's A Collaborative Approach for Reducing Wildland Fire Risks to Communities and the Environment - A 10-Year Comprehensive Strategy - Implementation Plan have collectively become known as the National Fire Plan.

The National Fire Plan, and the subsequent Healthy Forests Initiative (HFI), significantly increased Federal funding for projects on private lands, both "on the ground" and educational, that would reduce the wildfire risk to Federal lands.

For the first time, the Bureau of Land Management (BLM), National Park Service (NPS), U.S. Fish and Wildlife Service (FWS), and Bureau of Indian Affairs (BIA) had funds available for grants to organizations for use on non-Federal lands. Unlike the U.S. Forest Service, (USFS), these four agencies did not have any internal structure in place to administer grants to the private sector, so some process needed to be established to administer these grant funds. As the Clearinghouse got established, the USFS also came on board.

=== Different requirements by different agencies ===
Another factor was that every agency had different timeframes and formats for submittal of Concept Papers. The agencies also had different requirements for environmental compliance, such as NEPA and other regulations. These factors made it very difficult for applicants to submit funding requests to different agencies.

== The Fire Safe California Grants Clearinghouse is created ==
So in 2002, the members of the Fire Alliance, including the CFSCI, developed a standard application, with one timeframe. It was based on the very successful Community-Based Wildfire Prevention Grants Program established in 2001 to administer funds on behalf of BLM. This is discussed in detail in the article on the California Fire Safe Council.

The members of the Fire Alliance designated the CFSCI as the administrator of the Clearinghouse without a competitive bidding process.

=== Two independent aspects of the Clearinghouse ===
The Clearinghouse consists of two aspects: project selection and funding administration. Historically, both parts have been overseen by the CFSCI; however, they are actually independent functions.

==== Project selection ====
"FSC [i.e., the CFSCI] convenes a grant review and brokering session that includes all agencies with funding in the clearinghouse and a volunteer-based review committee of grant experts, for example, from state and local government and the private sector. For grants that pass through the FSC, the FSC board of directors also will have to have a procedural vote to approve the grants at a regularly scheduled quarterly meeting to ensure the FSC complies with its policies in the area of subgranting."

==== Grant Administration ====
"FSC [i.e., the CFSCI] funds and monitors programs. FSC plans to advance funding to subrecipients on a quarterly basis. Monitoring includes reviewing quarterly reports, checking in with subrecipients via phone and doing monitoring visits as needed."

Grant administration also includes the authority of the CFSCI to cancel previously approved grants.

=== No public oversight ===
Even though it administers millions of public funds on behalf of Federal agencies, the CFSCI operates the Clearinghouse without any public oversight. Even its own Board of Directors has been kept out of the loop; for example, in 2003 the Board was asked to vote to accept the list of approved projects even though the list was not yet available for them to see and in 2005 questions by the Board about the selection process were brushed aside by Chairman Turbeville.
