= Defensible space (fire control) =

Natural or landscaped buffer to reduce fire danger

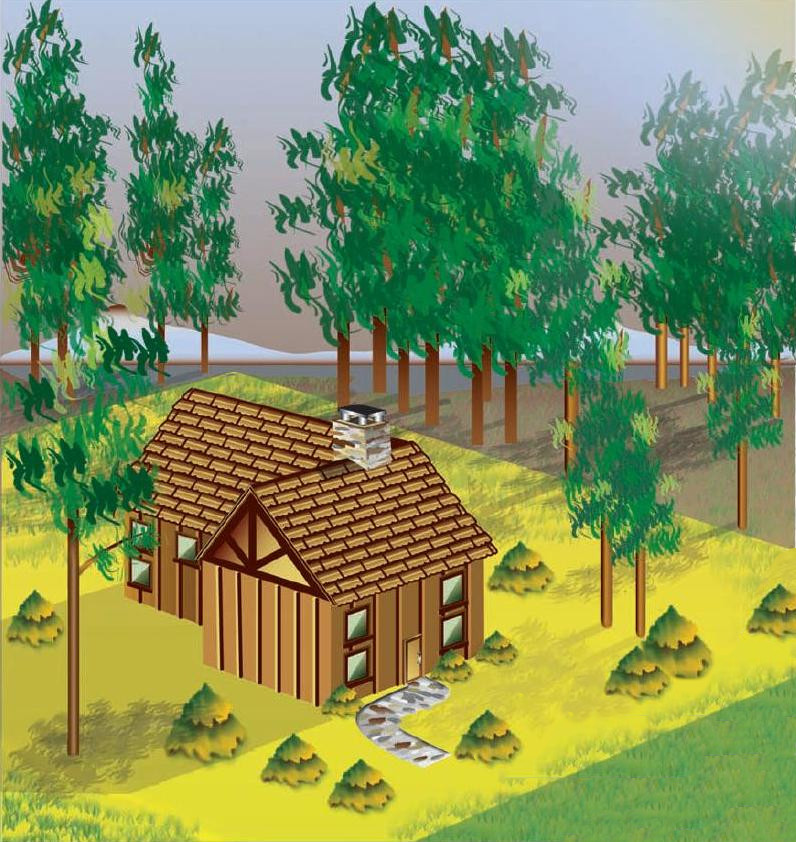
Graphic from the Government Accountability Office showing defensible space surrounding a home. The defensible space is marked in yellow.

A defensible space, in the context of fire control, is a natural or landscaped area around a structure that has been maintained and designed to reduce fire danger. The practice is sometimes called firescaping. "Defensible space" is also used in the context of wildfires, especially in the wildland–urban interface (WUI). This defensible space reduces the risk that fire will spread from one area to another, or to a structure, and provides firefighters access and a safer area from which to defend a threatened area. Firefighters sometimes do not attempt to protect structures without adequate defensible space, as it is less safe and less likely to succeed.

== Criteria ==
- A first concept of defensible space for most fire agencies' primary goal of fuel reduction is a recommended or required defensible space around a structure to extend for at least 100 feet (30 m) in all directions.
- A second concept of defensible space is "fuel reduction." This means plants are selectively thinned and pruned to reduce the combustible fuel mass of the remaining plants. The goal is to break up the more continuous and dense uninterrupted layer of vegetation.
- A third concept of defensible space is "fuel ladder" management. Like rungs on a ladder, vegetation can be present at varying heights from groundcover to trees. Ground fuel "rungs", such as dried grasses, can transmit fire to shrub rungs, which then transmit up tree branch rungs into the tree canopy. A burning tree produces embers that can blow to new areas, spreading and making it more difficult to control a wildland fire. One guideline is for a typical separation of three times the height of the lower fuel to the next fuel ladder. For example, a 2-foot-high (0.6 m) shrub under a tree would need a spacing of 6 feet (2 m) to the lowest limbs of the tree. Since wildfires burn faster uphill than on flat land, fuel ladder spacing may need to be greater for slopes.

== Landscape use ==
The term defensible space in landscape use ("firescape") refers to the 100-foot (30 m) zone surrounding a structure. Often the location is in the wildland–urban interface. This area need not be devoid of vegetation by using naturally fire resistive plants that are spaced, pruned and trimmed, and irrigated, to minimize the fuel mass available to ignite and also to hamper the spread of a fire.

1. The first 30 feet (9 m) is the "Defensible Space Zone," of a defensible space around a structure. It is where vegetation is kept to a minimum combustible mass. A guideline used in this zone can be "low, lean and green." Trees should be kept to a minimum of 10 feet (3 m) from other trees to reduce risk of fire spread between trees. Wood piles should be kept in zone 2. No branches should be touching or hanging over the roof of the house or within 10 feet of the structure to help keep the structure safe. Any dead vegetation or plants from zone 1 should be removed, and vegetation near windows should be pruned or removed.
2. The second distance of 30 to 100 feet (9 to 30 m), is the "Reduced Fuel Zone" of a defensible space around a structure. In this area of the defensible space, fuels and vegetation are separated vertically and horizontally depending on the vegetation type. This is done by: thinning, pruning, and removal of selected vegetation; and removing lower limbs from trees closer to lower vegetation and the lateral separation of tree canopies. Grass height should not exceed 4 inches (10 cm). Trees should be 10 feet away from each other on a flat to mild slope but should be double that on a mild to moderate slope. Shrubs should be as far away as twice its height for flat to mid-slope but four times its height for mild to moderate slope. Leaves, twigs, needles, clones, bark, and small branches should be removed but can be left up to a depth of 3 inches (8 cm). Vertical space from trees to ground should be 6 feet (2 m) while the vertical distance from a tree to a shrub should be the height of the shrub times three.

Creating zones to better divide the space is the recommended approach to having effective defensible space. These zones act as partitions to show what can be allowed in certain areas. There should be no dried vegetation or flammable materials near this zone. Zone 0 is anything 0–5 feet from the building. Gravel, pavers and noncombustible mulch should be used to create a barrier between the home and zone 1. Zone 1 is anything within 30 feet of the building. All combustibles should be removed from this zone. This includes dried vegetation, wooden furniture, umbrellas and canopies. Ideal substitutions for this zone would be well irrigated grass, rocks and metal furniture. Zone 2 should have well spaced out trees and other vegetation. Noncombustible furniture and structures should be separating the flammable vegetation. Fire breaks such as gravel pathways and driveways should be used as fire breaks on the property. Grass should be well irrigated and cut regularly. There should be enough vertical space between trees and ground vegetation to prevent fire spread. Zone 3 is the transition zone between the defensible space and the natural land. Maintenance is not as strict bust should still be done. The main goal of this zone is to slow the speed of the fire and keep it from spreading to the other zones.

An important component is ongoing maintenance of the fire-resistant landscaping for reduced fuel loads and fire fighting access. Fire-resistive plants that are not maintained can desiccate, die, or amass deadwood debris, and become fire assistive. Irrigation systems and pruning can help maintain a plant's fire resistance. Maintaining access roads and driveways clear of side and low-hanging vegetation can allow large fire equipment to reach properties and structures. Some agencies recommend clearing combustible vegetation at minimum horizontal 10 feet (3 m) from roads and driveways a vertical of 13 feet 6 inches (4 m) above them. Considering the plant material involved is important to not create unintended consequences to habitat integrity and unnecessary aesthetic issues. Street signs, and homes clearly identified with the numerical address, assist access also.

== Fire Resistant Plants ==
Some of the best ways to slow the spread of a fire to homes is to reduce the amount of fuel available for the fire. Within each zone, the amount of vegetation should drastically decrease. Having fire resistant plants in zones farther away from the home will help to slow down the fire even more.

Some things to look for when picking fire resistant plants are high moisture content in leaves, limited dead vegetation, and low amounts of oils within the plant. Upkeep on these plants are also important for fire protection. Removal of excess branches and leaves will lessen the amount of potential fuel.Here are a few fire resistant plant examples, there are many different types of flowers, shrubs and trees that have fire resistant properties.

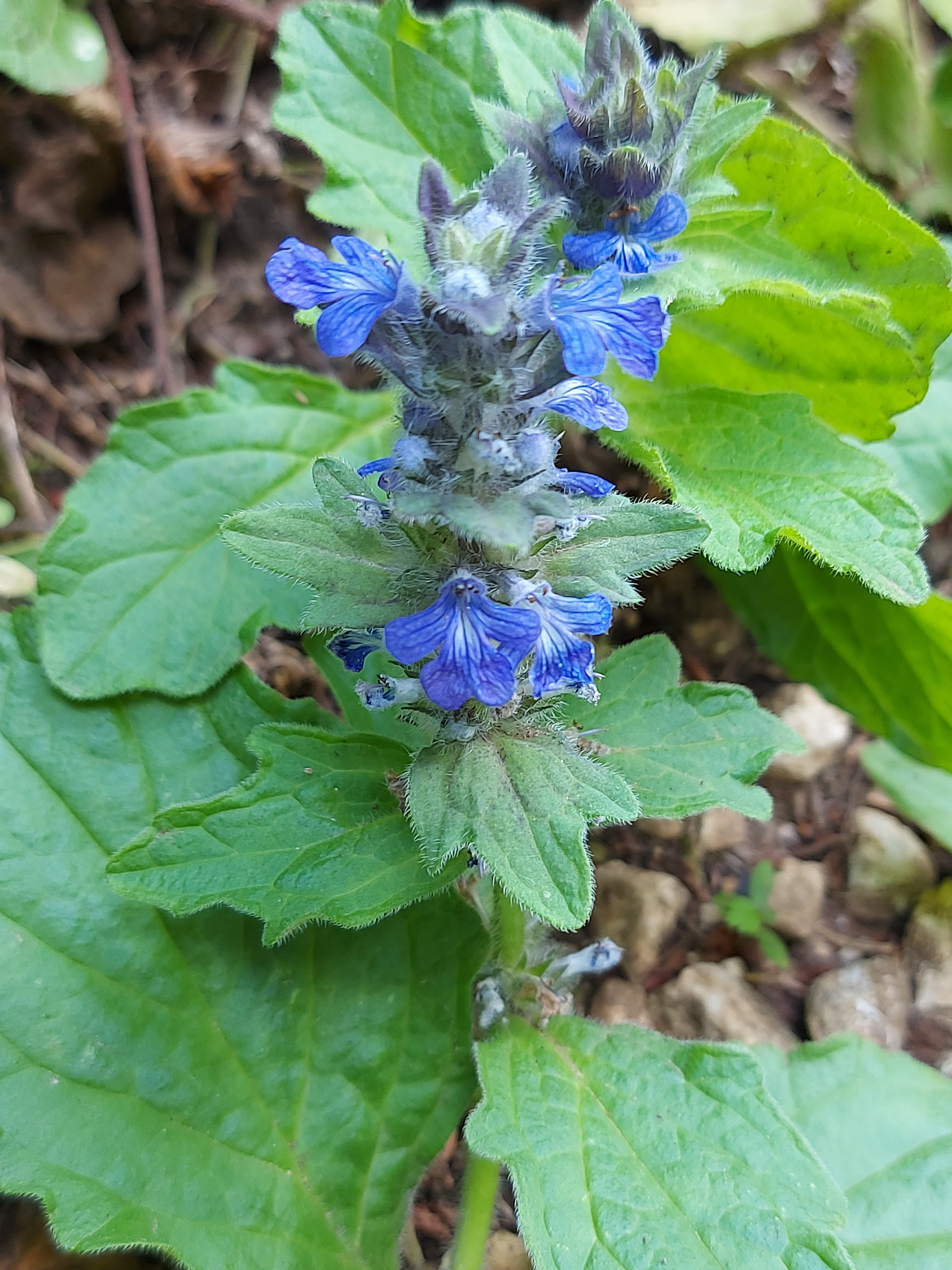
Bugleweed- Spreads across the ground and will cover other weeds and vegetation blocking embers from form potential fuel.

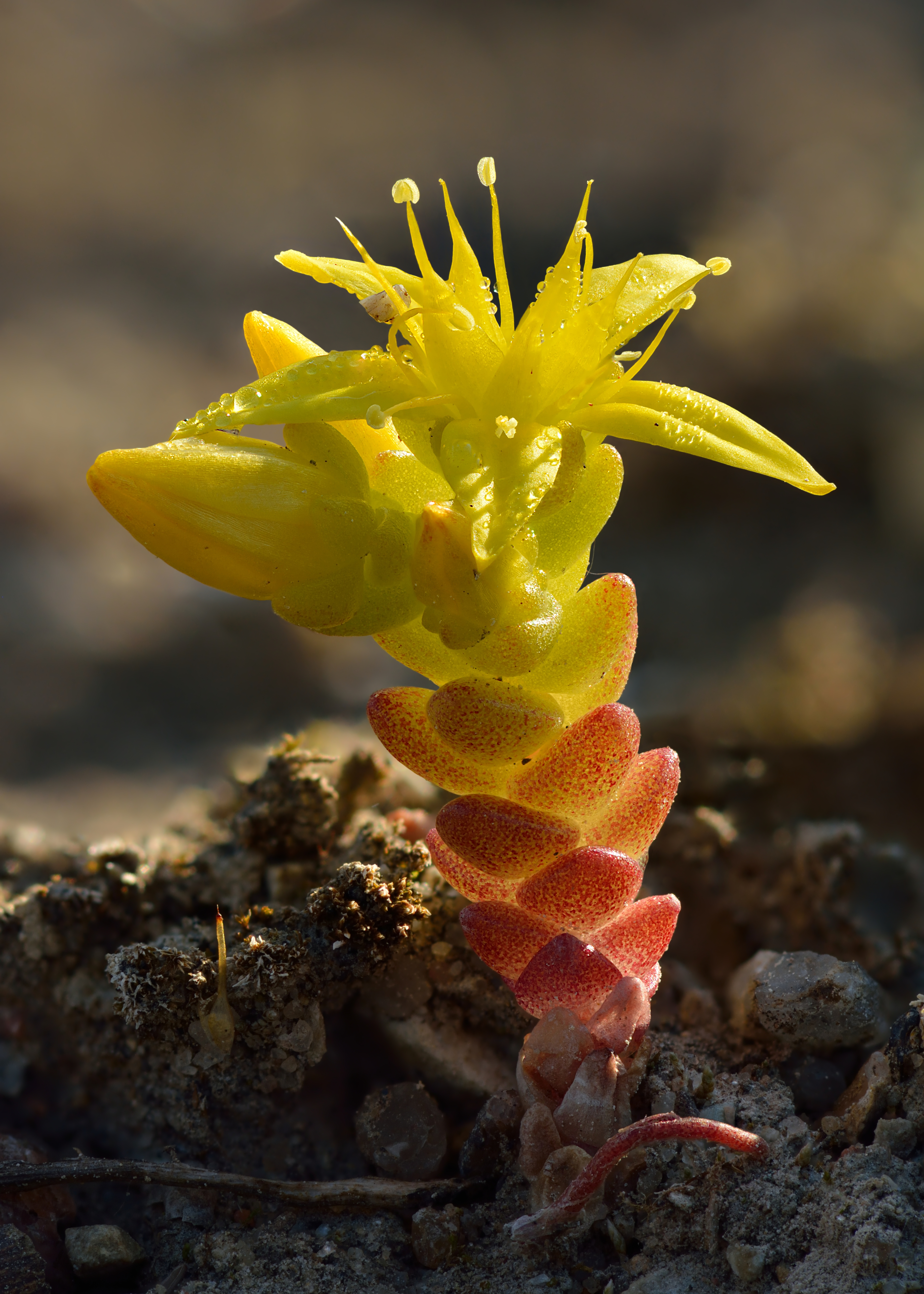
Sedum- These are part of the plant group called "stonecrops". They are great to have in rock gardens and do not require a ton of soil to grow.

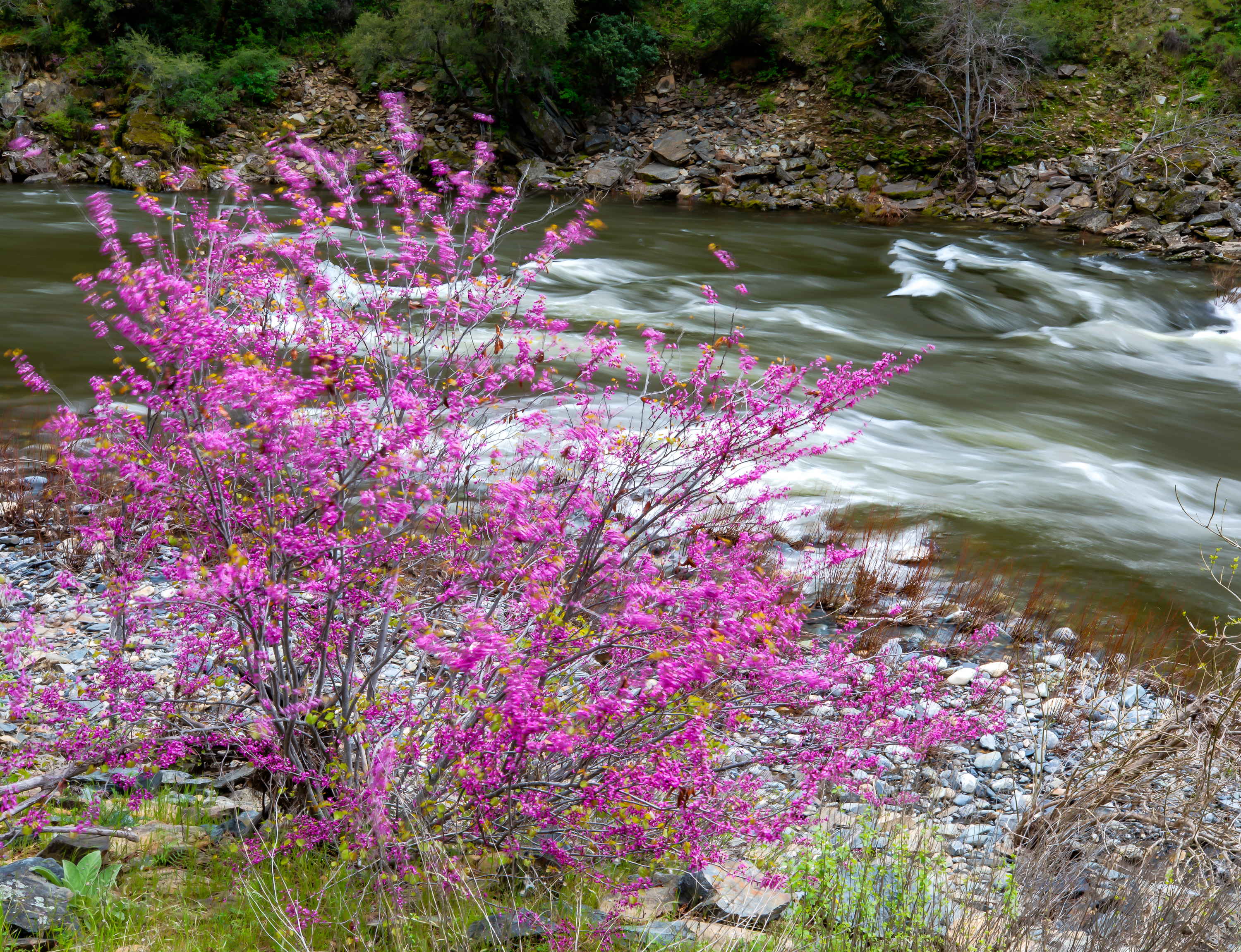
California Redbud- These shrubs are very good at retaining water and do not leave a lot of dead vegetation.

== Unintended consequences ==
The unintended negative consequences of erosion and native habitat loss can result from some unskillful defensible space applications. The disturbance of the soil surface, such as garden soil cultivation in and firebreaks beyond native landscape zones areas, destroys the native plant cover and exposes open soil, accelerating invasive species of plants ("invasive exotics") spreading and replacing native habitats.

In suburban and wildland–urban interface areas, the vegetation clearance and brush removal ordinances of municipalities for defensible space can result in mistaken excessive clearcutting of native and non-invasive introduced shrubs and perennials that exposes the soil to more light and less competition for invasive plant species, and also to erosion and landslides. Negative aesthetic consequences to natural and landscaped areas can be minimized with integrated and balanced defensible space practices.

== See also ==
- Fire ecology
- Firefighting
- Wildfire suppression
