= Sakari Pinomäki =

Finnish systems engineer and an inventor

Sakari Pinomäki (1933–2011) was a Finnish systems engineer and an inventor, who pioneered the mechanized forestry industry. He was the founder of PIKA Forest Machines which produced the first purpose-built forest machine in 1964 in Ylöjärvi , Finland. His inventions had over 50 patents.

== History ==
Sakari Pinomäki's first company, PIKA Forest Machines, is credited with designing the first self-propelled tree length timber processor, the PIKA Model 60, in 1968, and the first fully mobile timber "harvester", the PIKA Model 75, in 1974. These machines differed significantly from other "retro-fitted" forestry machines in that they were designed from inception to be timber harvesting and processing equipment, and were not conventional farming or earth moving equipment with additional apparatus welded onto them to allow timber processing work to be possible. Pinomäki coined the term "harvester" to describe his Model 75 machine, which differs from a tree length processor in that a harvester grips, fells, de-limbs and sections the tree on site, while a processor simply de-limbs a tree that has been felled by chain saws and dragged to the delimbing equipment. His designs and innovations have been subsequently copied by at least five other major manufacturers of heavy timber equipment, including Timberjack, Valmet and Ponsse, and were instrumental in developing the "Scandinavian" system of timber harvesting, which is far more sustainable and nature conserving than the methods employed up till the mid-20th century. The two machine harvester-forwarder system consequently became the worldwide standard for sustainable forestry.

One of the most significant of PIKA's inventions has been the Paralcon Hydraulic valve system that can be used on any twin boom extending-retracting crane. This valve uses return oil flow pressure to power the extension piston, and flow oil pressure to power the retraction movement of the crane, as opposed to standard configurations that use additional pumps to power these crane movements. The result is that far less motor torque is necessary to operate the crane, which consumes far less fuel; this in turn saves operators money and reduces CO_{2} emissions for the machinery in use.

Additionally, S. Pinomäki Ky PIKA was first to market in the early 21st century with the world's first production "Combination" machine, a single machine that can function in both harvester and forwarder roles. This 50 percent reduction in machinery to perform the same harvesting work means far less environmental pollution from CO_{2} emissions and terrain damage from machinery operation, and has again been co-opted by every major manufacturer of heavy timber processing equipment.

Sakari died on July 29, 2011, after a battle with pancreatic cancer. He is survived by his two daughters and three grandchildren.

== See also ==
- Forestry
- Harvester (forestry)
- Logging
