= Felling =

Process of cutting down trees

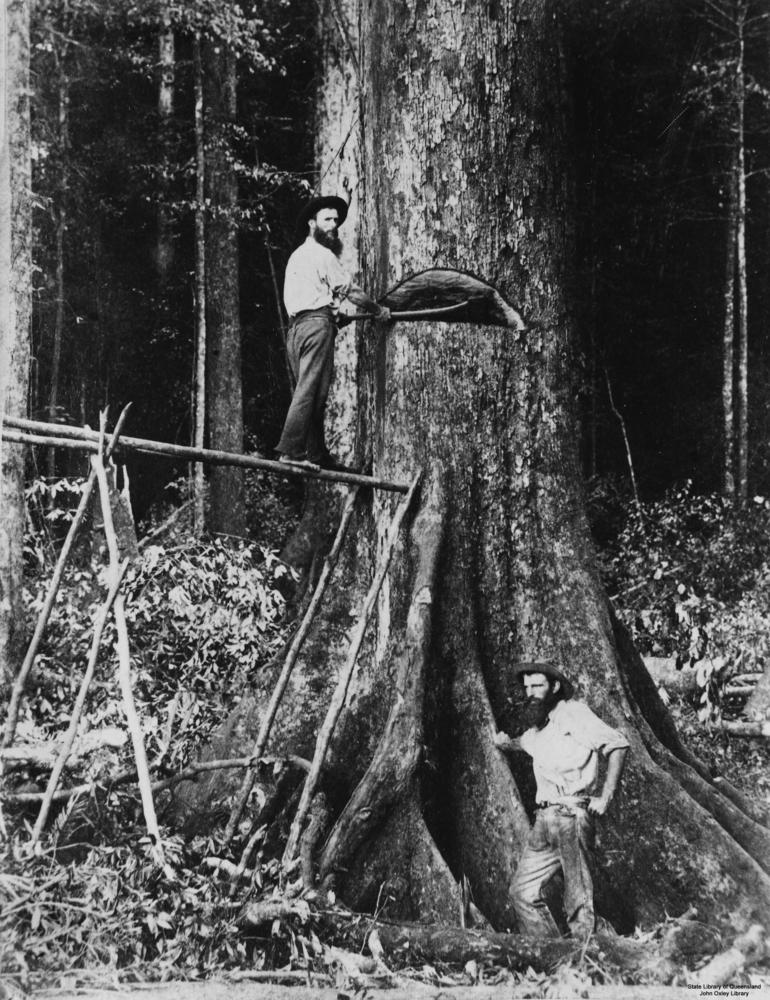
Two lumberjacks at work on a tree on the Atherton Tableland, Queensland, Australia, 1890–1900

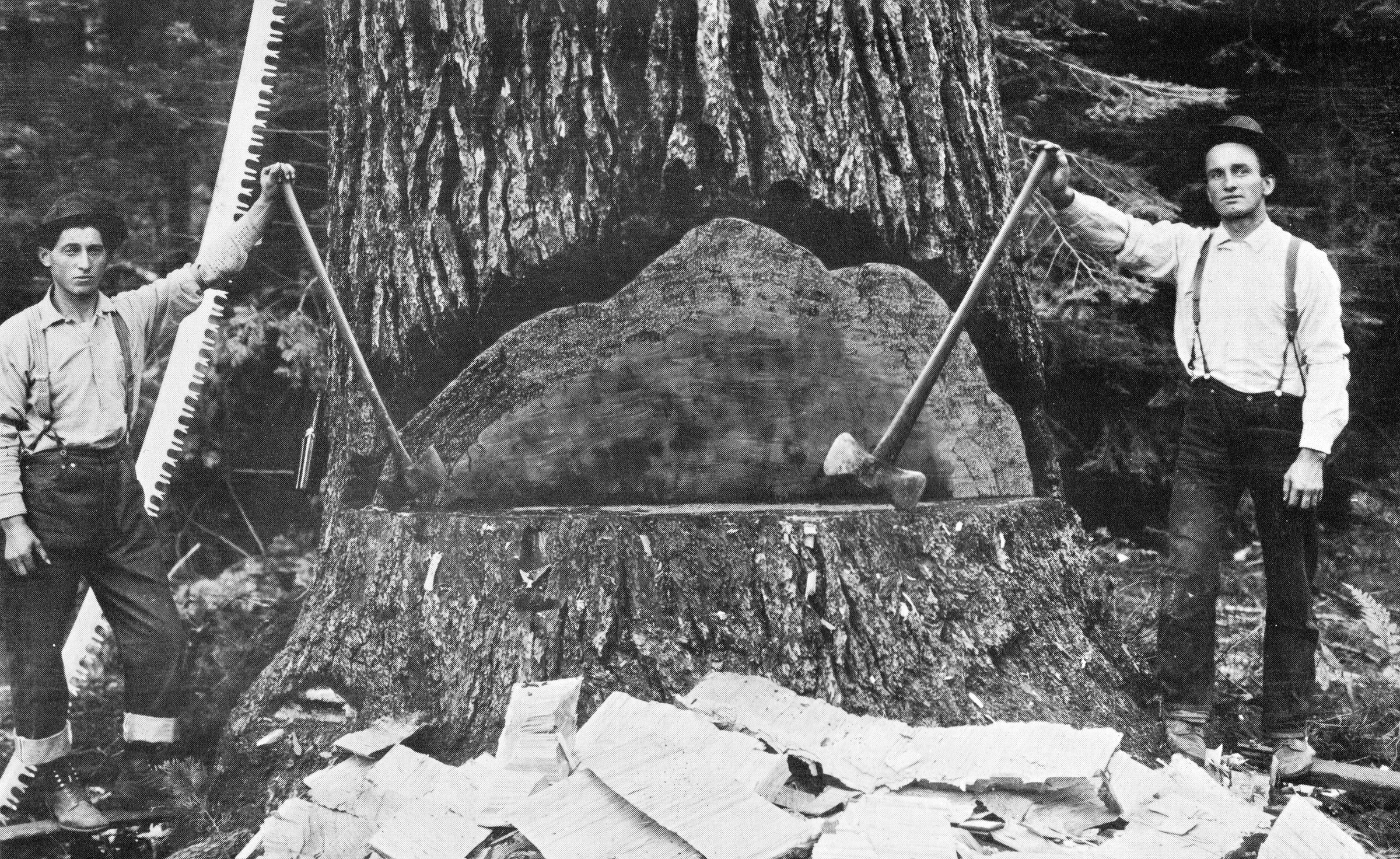
A completed undercut in a Sugar Pine tree in Madera County, California around 1911.

Felling is the process of cutting down trees, an element of the task of logging. The person cutting the trees is a lumberjack. A feller buncher is a machine capable of felling a single large tree or grouping and felling several small ones simultaneously.

== Methods ==
=== Hand felling ===
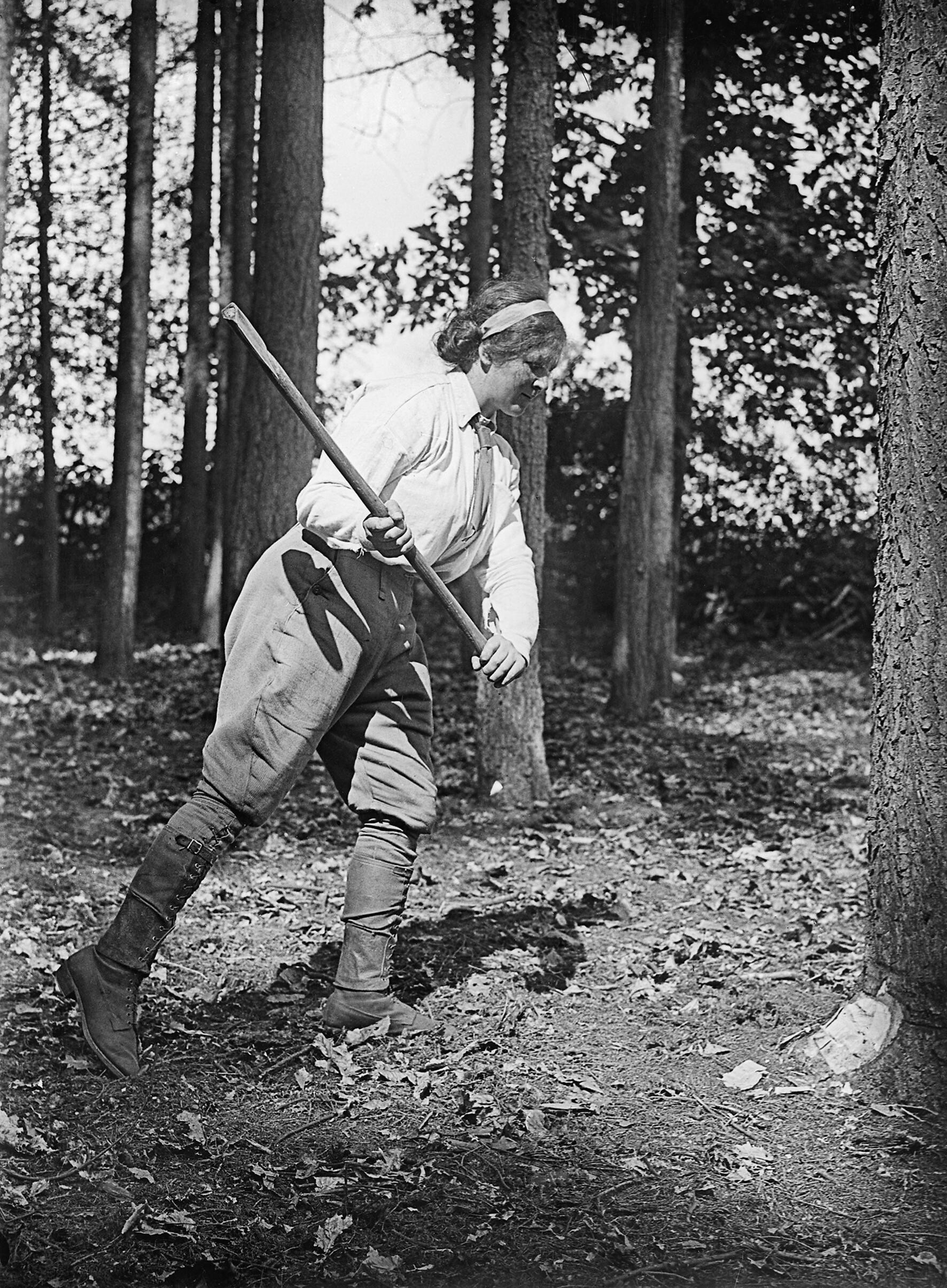
A lumberjack felling a tree with an axe during World War I

In hand felling, an axe, saw, or chainsaw is used to fell a tree, followed up by limbing and bucking in traditional applications. In the modern commercial logging industry, felling is typically followed by limbing and skidding.

=== Feller buncher ===
A feller-buncher is a motorized vehicle with an attachment which rapidly cuts and gathers several trees in the process of felling them.

In cut-to-length logging a harvester performs the tasks of a feller-buncher, additionally doing the delimbing and bucking. When harvesting wood from a felled tree, the recommended methods should be followed in order to maximize wood recovery. The suggested trend is to make deeper cuts and smaller openness when performing undercuts.

== Types of cut ==
The undercut or notch cut is the guiding or aiming slot for the tree and is a V-shaped notch placed on the side of the tree in the direction of intended fall.

The back cut or felling cut is made on the opposite side of the tree of the undercut and is cut through the base of the tree severing the “hinge” holding the tree up.

The Tongue and Groove cut is a type of cut that uses the tree as its own guide for where it will fall. This is commonly used by loggers when they need precision in their drop

== Reasons for felling trees ==
It may be necessary to fell trees for a number of reasons. Trees are generally felled because:

- The wood of the tree will be used as a raw material for other processes.
- The tree is too diseased or damaged to survive
- The tree is creating a safety hazard
- The tree is blocking construction activity
- The tree is causing damage to nearby structures or property.

== Regulations and Industry Standards ==
Tree felling is regulated by various safety, environmental, and industry standards to ensure worker safety, sustainable forestry practices, and legal compliance. Regulations vary by country and jurisdiction, but common frameworks exist for occupational safety, environmental protection, and responsible timber harvesting.

=== Occupational Safety Standards ===
To minimize accidents and injuries, several international safety organizations set guidelines for felling practices, including:

- United States: The Occupational Safety and Health Administration (OSHA) regulates logging and tree care operations under 29 CFR 1910.266, requiring proper chainsaw handling, personal protective equipment (PPE), and safe felling procedures. The ANSI Z133 Safety Standard further provides best practices for arboriculture work.
- Europe: The European Agency for Safety and Health at Work (EU-OSHA) sets forestry safety guidelines, requiring risk assessments, felling training, and PPE usage.
- Canada: WorkSafeBC provides detailed forestry safety regulations, including guidelines on tree felling, mechanized logging, and chainsaw operation.

=== Environmental Regulations ===
Governments and environmental organizations enforce laws to protect forests from overharvesting and ecological damage:

- Sustainable Harvesting Laws: Many countries require harvesting permits and compliance with forest management plans to regulate logging activities. In the U.S., the National Forest Management Act (NFMA) mandates sustainable forest harvesting on federal lands.
- Protected Areas: Felling is restricted in national parks, conservation areas, and old-growth forests. The European Union enforces logging restrictions in protected areas through the Natura 2000 network.
- Deforestation Controls: The United Nations REDD+ Program promotes sustainable forestry practices in tropical regions to combat illegal logging and reduce carbon emissions.

=== Industry Certification and Best Practices ===
- Forest Stewardship Council (FSC): An international certification ensuring timber is harvested sustainably, balancing economic, environmental, and social factors.
- Sustainable Harvesting Laws: Many countries require harvesting permits and compliance with forest management plans to regulate logging activities. In the U.S., the National Forest Management Act (NFMA) mandates sustainable forest harvesting on federal lands.
- Deforestation Controls: The United Nations REDD+ Program promotes sustainable forestry practices in tropical regions to combat illegal logging and reduce carbon emissions.

== Boom-corridor experiment ==
This was an experiment conducted regarding felling trees and the continuous felling of trees in boom-corridors which might lead to an increase in harvester productivity. An efficient way to do this would be to use felling heads which would increase efficiency and fall time.

== Gallery ==
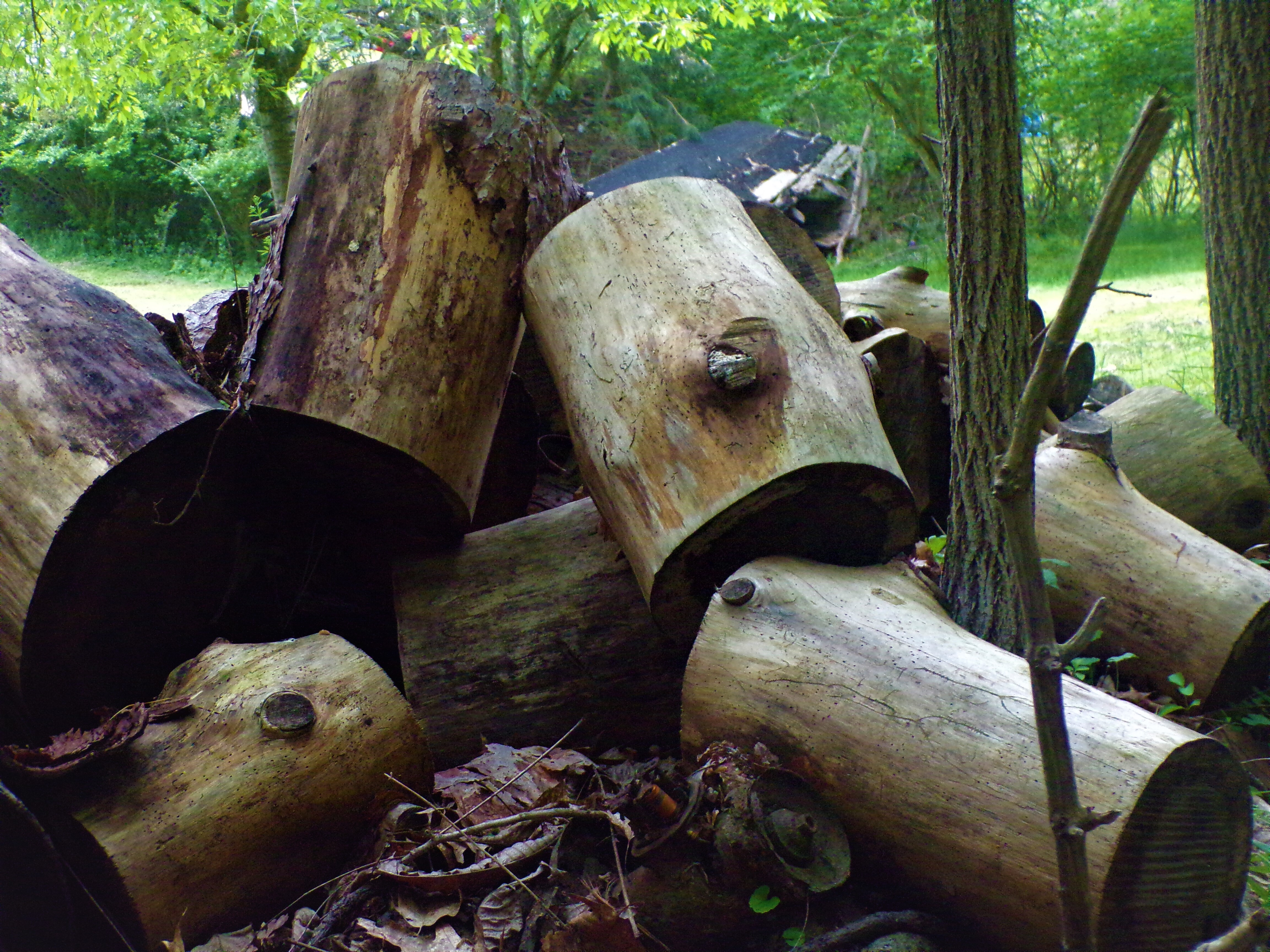
Timber rounds that have been cut and stockpiled for firewood

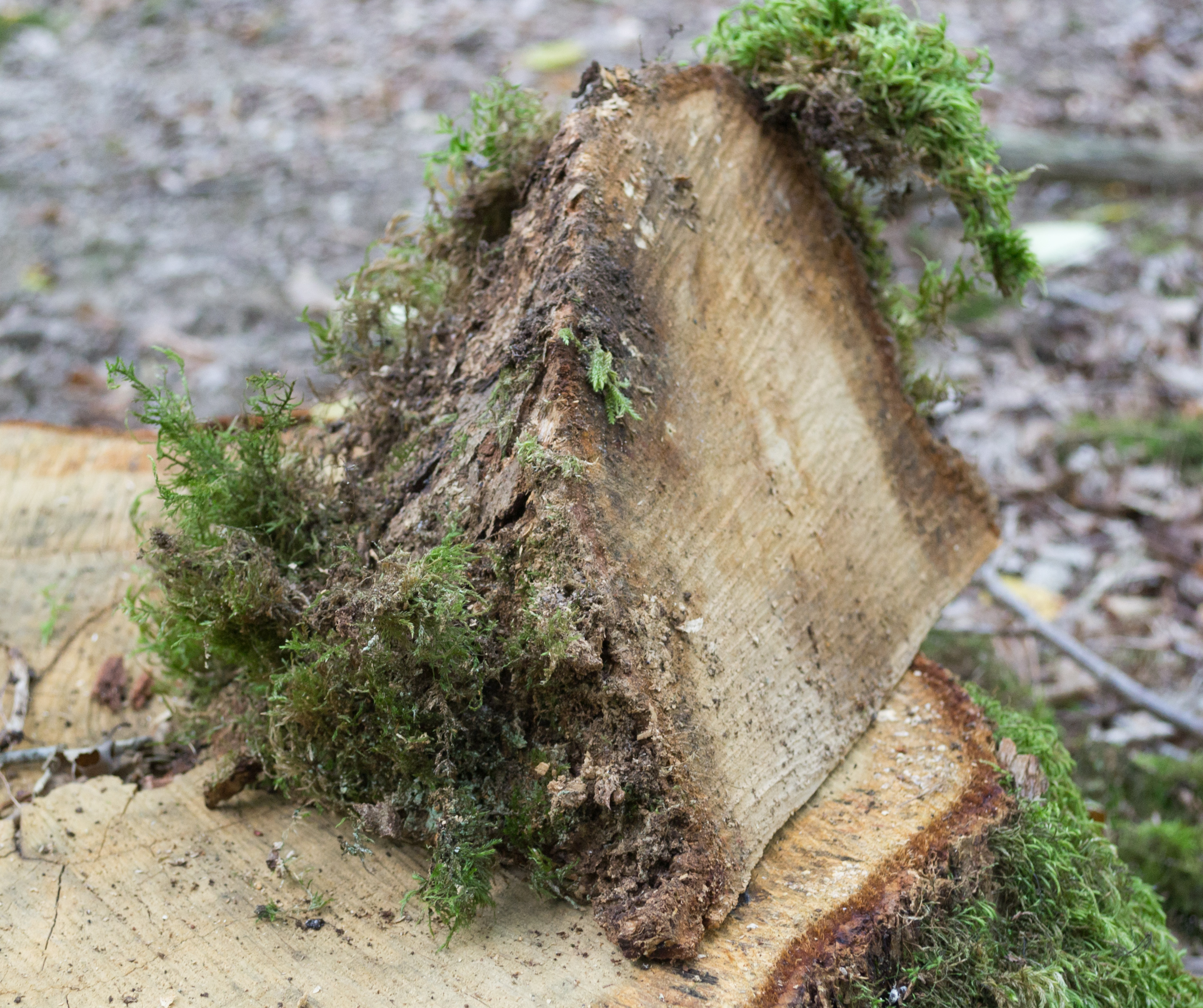
A piece of trunk, removed as a notch cut, set on a stump

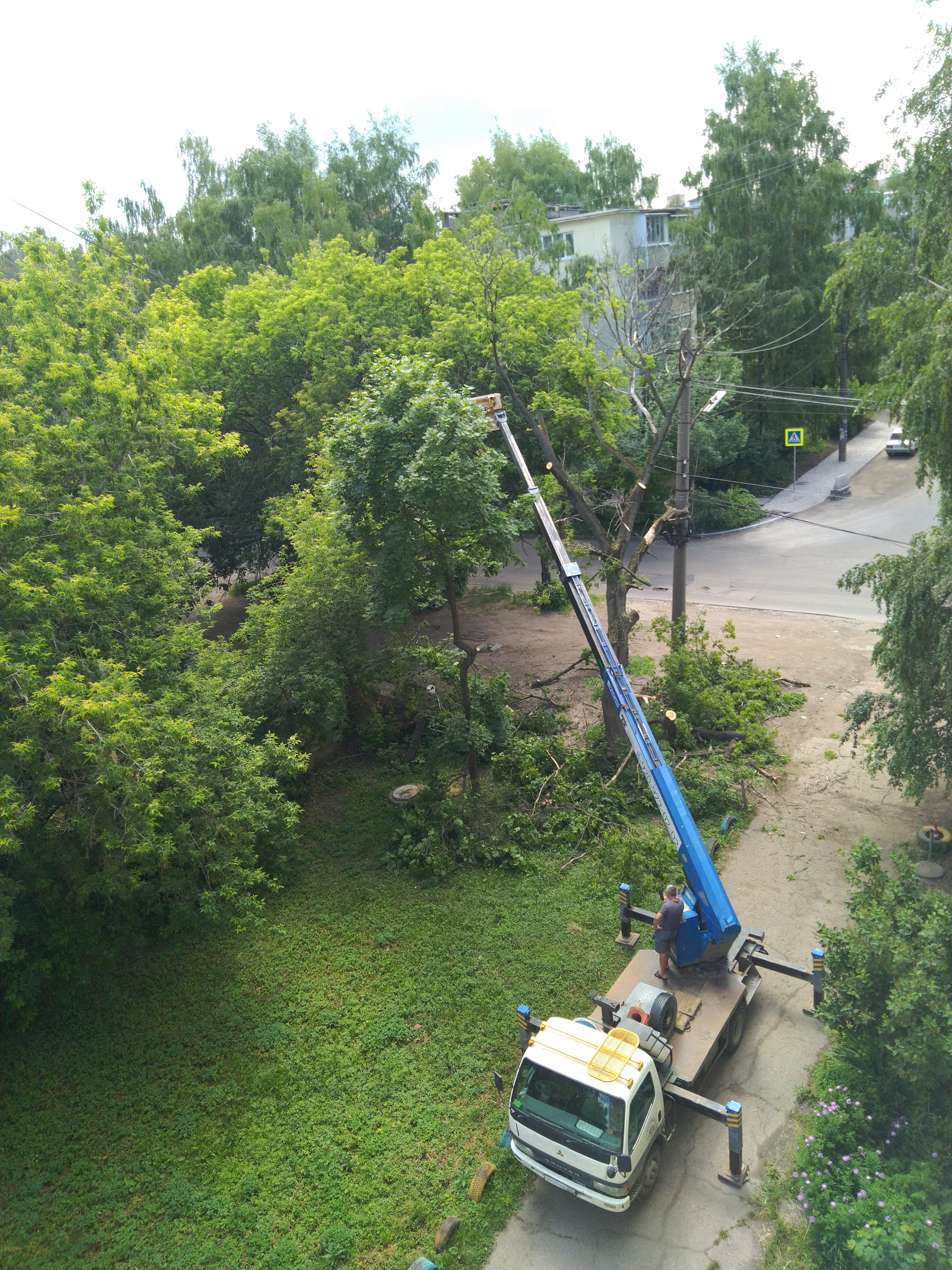
Felling in an urban setting in Russia. Telescopic handler and chainsaw are used.

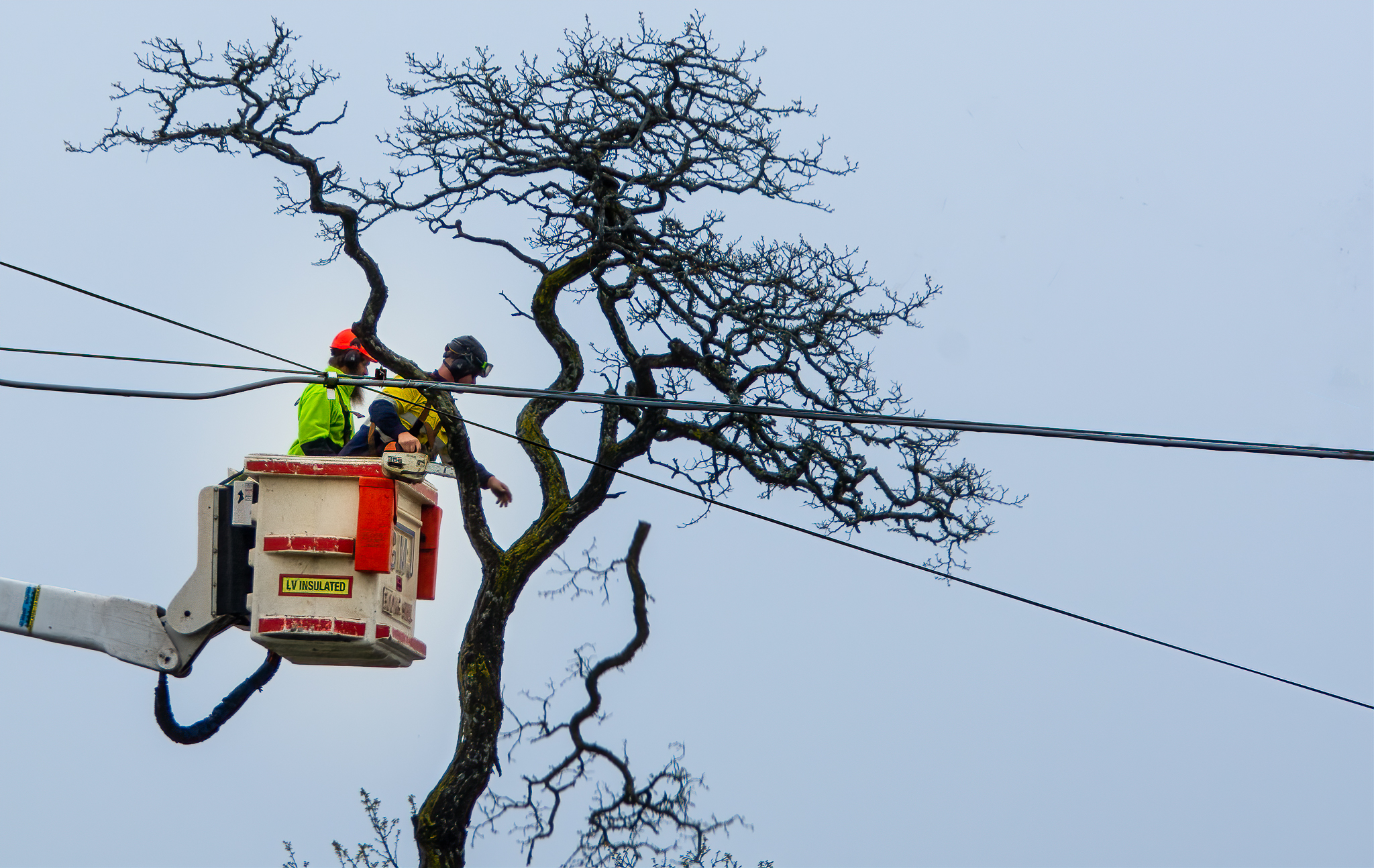
Urban felling in Australia. This is done to secure areas from accidental tree falls.

Video of felling, limbing, bucking, and moving of small trees
