= Feller buncher =

Type of harvester used in logging

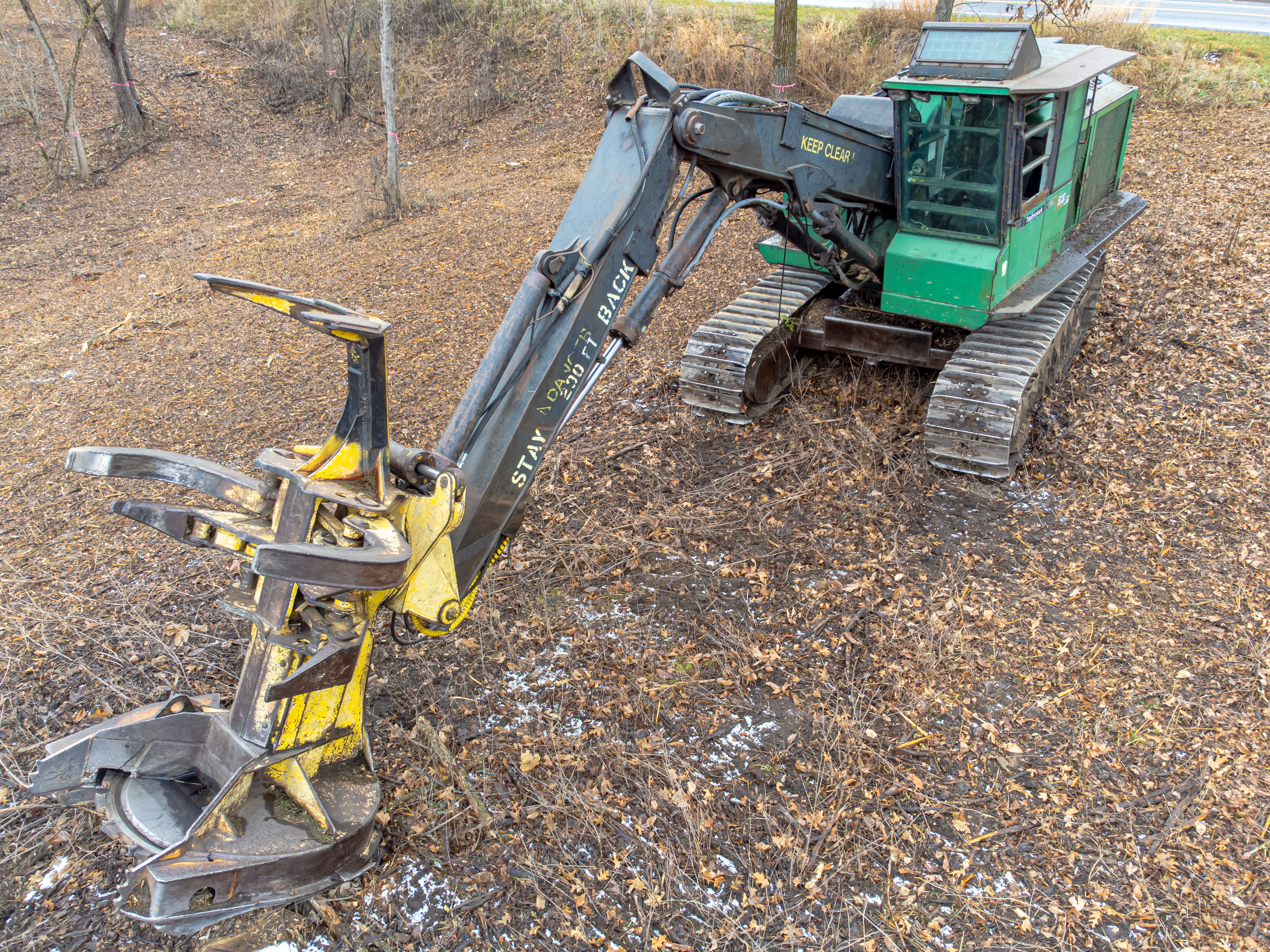
- Tracked feller buncher
- Classification: Wheeled or Tracked
- Industry: Forestry
- Application: logging
- Weight: 13,910 kg (30,670 lb)
- Fuel source: Diesel
- Powered: Diesel engine
- Self-propelled: Yes
- Wheels: 4 wheels, some types
- Tracks: Continuous tracks, some types

A feller buncher is a type of harvester used in logging. It is a motorized vehicle with an attachment that can rapidly gather and cut a tree before felling it.

Feller is a traditional name for someone who cuts down trees, and bunching is the skidding and assembly of two or more trees. A feller buncher performs both of these harvesting functions and consists of a standard heavy equipment base with a tree-grabbing device furnished with a chainsaw, circular saw or a shear—a pinching device designed to cut small trees off at the base. The machine then places the cut tree on a stack suitable for a skidder, forwarder, or yarder for transport to further processing such as delimbing, bucking, loading, or chipping.

Some wheeled feller bunchers lack an articulated arm, and must drive close to a tree to grasp it.

In cut-to-length logging, a harvester performs the tasks of a feller buncher and additionally does delimbing and bucking.

Feller buncher, felling trees.

== Components and felling attachment ==
Feller buncher is either tracked or wheeled and has self-levelling cabin and matches with different felling heads. For steep terrain, tracked feller buncher is being used because it provides high level of traction to the steep slope and also has high level of stability. For flat terrain, wheeled feller buncher is more efficient compared to tracked feller buncher. It is common that levelling cabins are matched with both wheeled and tracked feller buncher for steep terrain as it provides operator comfort and helps keeping the standard of tree felling production. The size and type of trees determine which type of felling heads being used.

=== Types of felling heads ===
Disc saw head – It can provide a high speed of cutting when the head is pushed against the tree. Then, the clamp arms will hold the tree when the tree is almost completed cutting. It is able to cut and gather multiple trees in the felling head. The disc saw head with good ground speed provides high production, which allows it to keep more than one skidder working continuously.

Shear blade head - It is placed against the tree and the clamp arms will hold the tree firmly. Then, the blade will activate and start cutting the tree. Same as disc saw head, it can hold multiple trees before they are placed on the ground.

Chain saw head – The floppy head provides minimal control to place the trees on the ground. It might not suit to collect the cut trees or gather the cut stems in the felling head.

== Cost-effectiveness ==
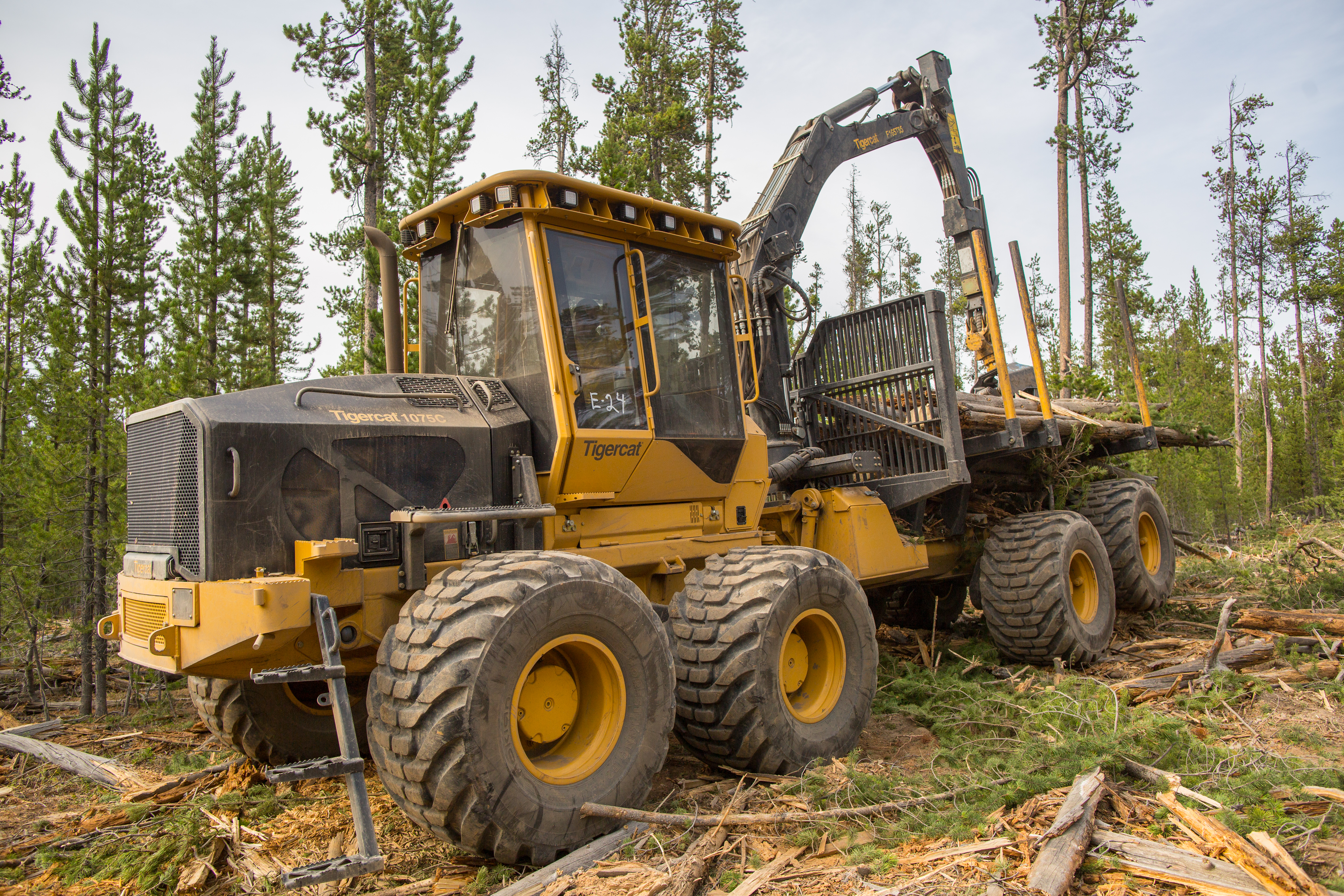
A forwarder hauls stacked logs left behind by a feller buncher.

The purchase cost of a feller buncher is around $180,000 USD and its fuel consumption and lubricant consumption is high among other mechanical harvesting equipment. The feller buncher also has the highest hourly cost which is around $99.5 when comparing other equipment such as a harvesters and grapple skidders. Although the total cost of feller buncher is high in overall, the unit production price is the lowest which explains why feller buncher is considered the most cost-effective harvesting equipment. The average unit cost of the feller buncher is $12.1/m3 while the unit cost of the harvesters is $16.5/m3. The unit cost of the feller buncher is primary affected by the tree size and the tree volume. The unit felling cost is lower when the tree size increased. For example, tree with 5 inches at DBH has the unit cost of $70 while tree with 15 inches at DBH has the unit cost of $12. As the cost of feller buncher is high, only large tree volume can produce more profit to cover the high average cost. In terms of stump height, lower stump height can maximise the use of natural resources and prevent wood waste. Mechanical felling such as using feller buncher can prevent 30% of value loss caused by the high stumps.

== Maintenance ==
Feller buncher requires daily maintenance before operation and some components only require periodic maintenance. It could ensure the safety of operators and all the workers around the operation. If damaged or faulty machine is operated, it could result in further damage to the machine which can be more expensive to repair.

=== Daily or Every 8 hours ===
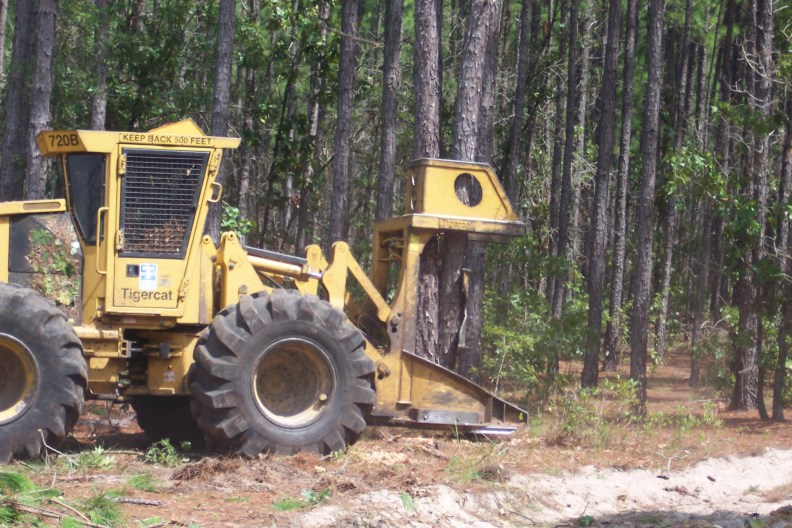
Modern style Tigercat feller buncher. Commonly referred to as a tree cutter

==== Lubrication ====
The felling head is considered one of the hardest part of the feller buncher and it is necessary to apply lubricant to every joint for daily maintenance. It is suggested to apply lubricant to saw head clamps, wrist attachment and driveshaft bearings during every maintenance. The use of grease should meet the extreme pressure performance standard and contains 3% of molybdenum disulphide (MoS_{2}). MoS_{2} can prevent the wear that takes place where metal to metal contact exists.

==== Fuel ====
It is also important to check if there is enough fuel for the operation. Feller bunchers use diesel fuel to generate power. In most of the cases, the fuel is preferably to have cetane number greater than 50 (minimum 40). This is suitable for operation at temperatures below -20 °C (-4 °F) or elevations more than 1500m (5000 Ft.). The Cloud point of the fuel is preferably at least 5 °C (9 °F) lower than the expected low temperature. It is also suggested that the sulphur content of the fuel should not be more than 0.5% as it could reduce 50% of the service interval for the engine oil and filter.

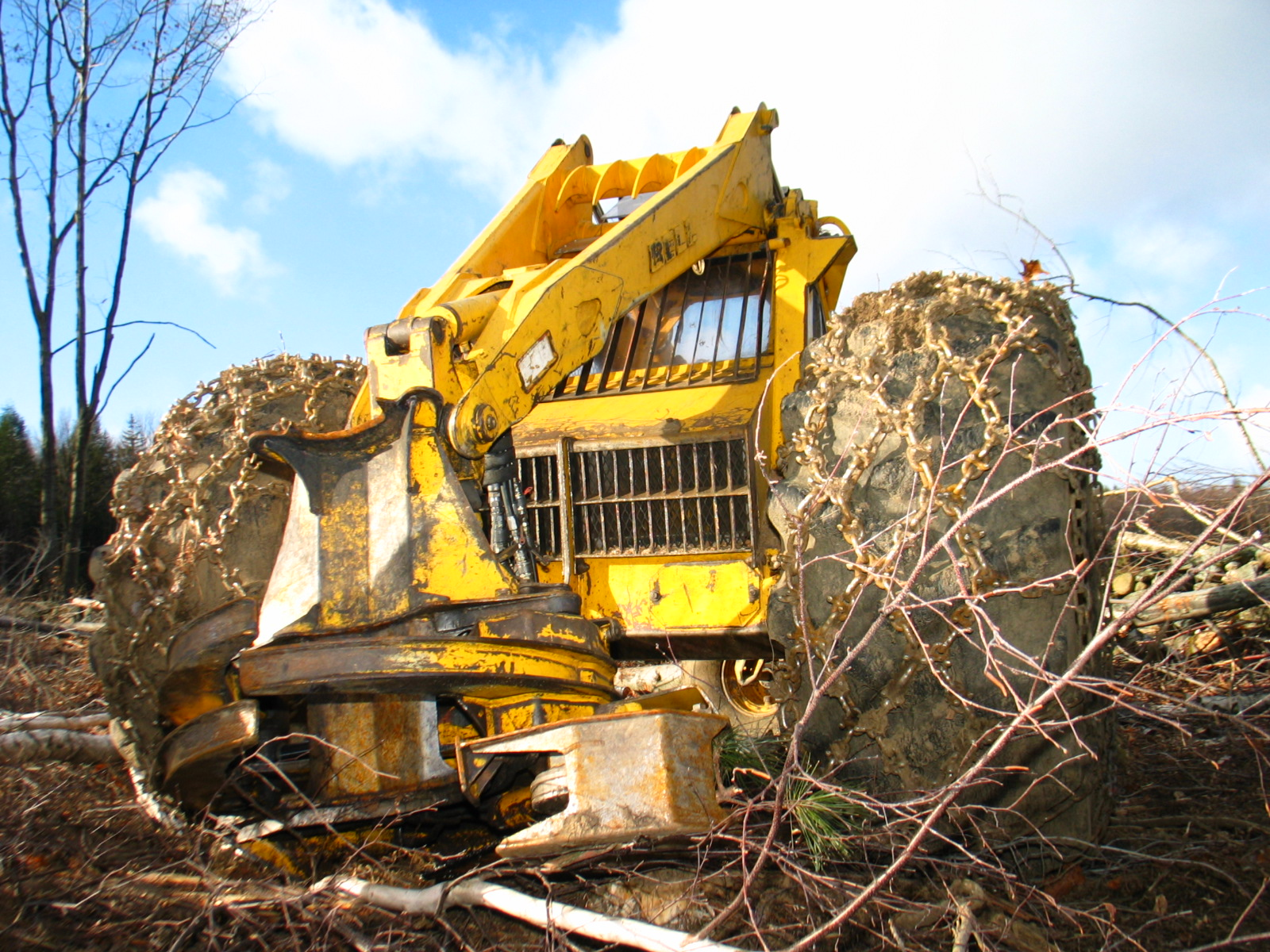
Older style felling head that uses a bar and chain to cut trees instead of the more modern saw disk.

==== Engine coolant ====
Operators have the responsibility to check the engine coolant level of the feller buncher before starting the engine. The coolant prevents cylinder linear erosion and pitting, and provides protection during extremely low temperature for up to -37 °C (-34 °F). It is recommended to use coolants for heavy-duty engines which are relatively low silicate ethylene glycol base. There are two forms of coolants: pre-diluted or concentrate. Water is required to dilute the concentrated coolant with an approximate ratio of 50:50. The use of supplemental coolant addictive might be also required in the concentrated coolant in order to provide protection against corrosion. Distilled, deionised, or demineralised water is suggested for mixing the concentrated coolant because when some water compositions mix with other substances could form a precipitate, causing damage or blockage in the engine.

=== Risk management approach ===
During maintenance, there are common working hazards related to two main areas: working environment and exhaust system. When working on the exhaust system, be aware of the hot components around the engine. Workers should wear personal protective equipment such as safety spectacles, heat-proof gloves and safety boots. When a feller buncher is elevated for service or maintenance, falls from height might happen. Related injuries could be avoided by ensuring dryness of all the walking surface, wiping any oils or other liquid substances on the floor. Also, ensure the feller buncher is parked on a level and stable ground during maintenance. When getting in and out of the machinery, workers are suggested to use three point of contact with two hands holding the handrails and one foot on a step. It is also important to provide sufficient lighting for all the working sites at all time of service.

== Safety ==
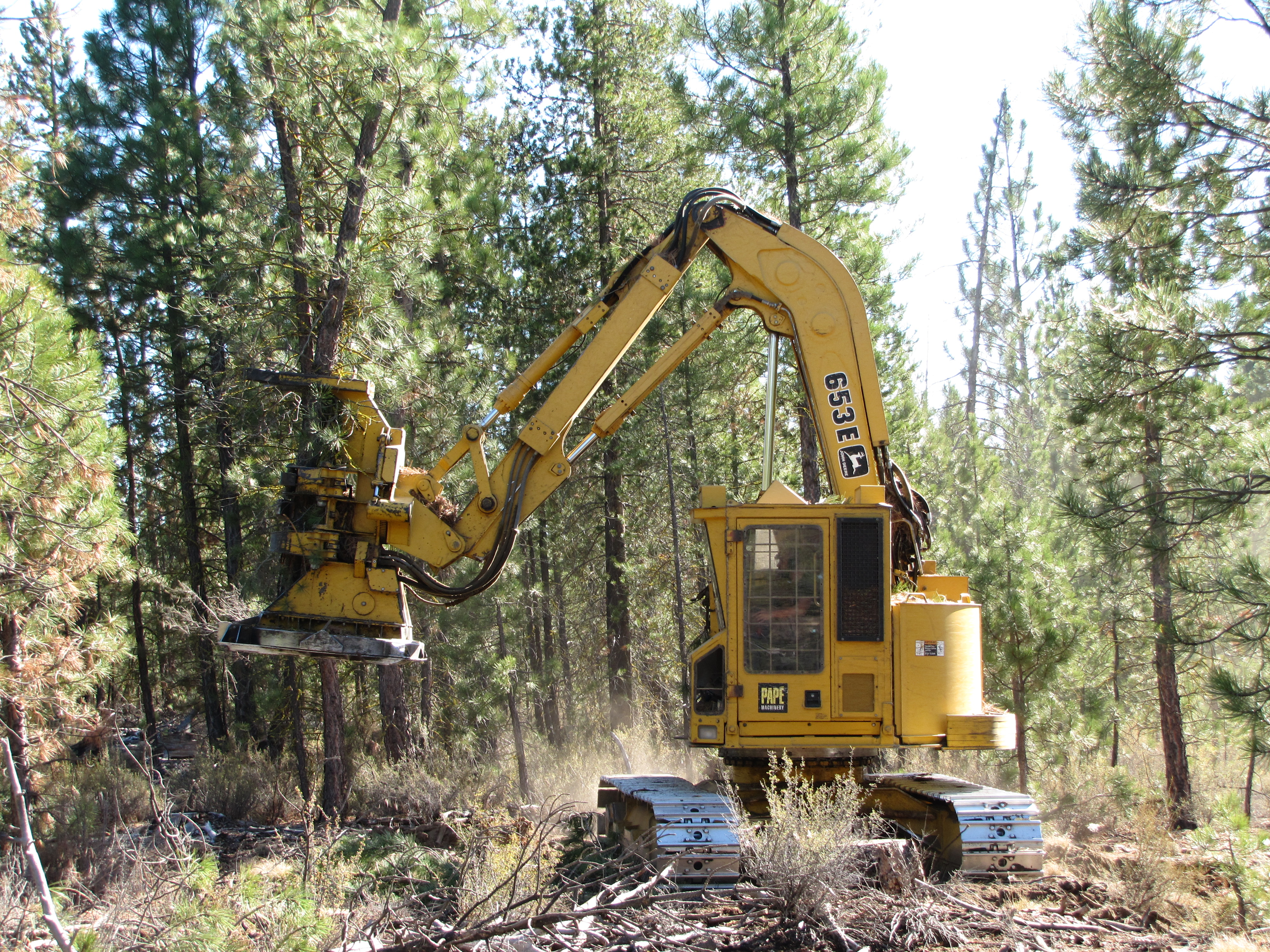
Cutting selected pines for sustainable forest management and fire prevention.

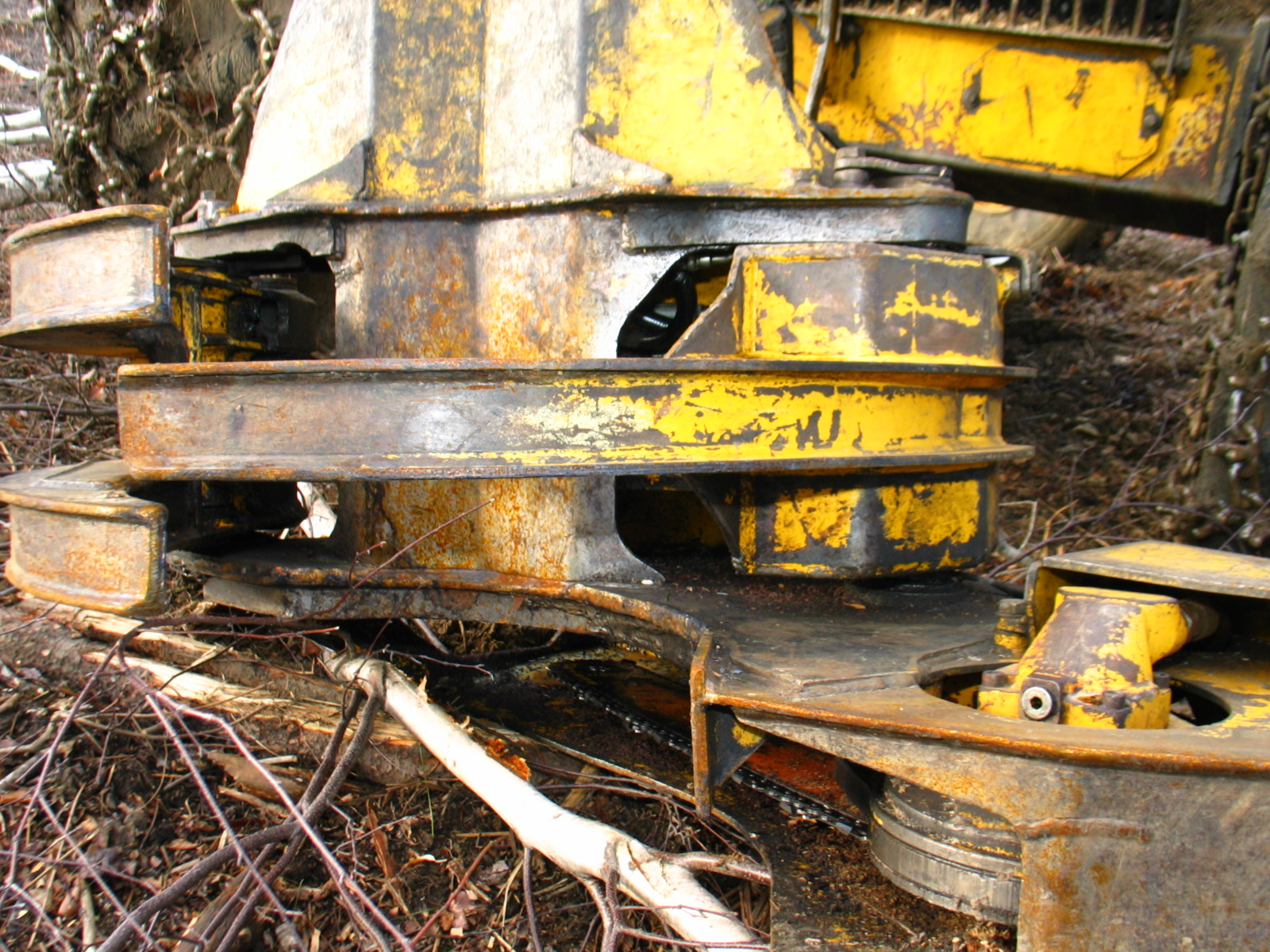
Closeup of grab arms, with chainsaw for felling trees

Logging is considered one of the most dangerous occupations. This is because many loggers are injured by the falling objects which are large in size and heavy. "Struck by object" is the most common injuries that reported in the logging industry due to the manual use of equipment during the logging procedures. There is evidence that using mechanized harvesting equipment could reduce the rate of "struck by" injuries. One study indicates that total injury claims could be reduced by 14.2%, while the "struck by" injuries could be reduced by 8.2%, when comparing the changes before and after the use of feller buncher. The significant decline in the number of "struck by" injuries after using the feller buncher in the logging companies supported the statement that using mechanized harvesting equipment could lessen overall injuries. The evidence also found that the rate of injuries in the logging companies without using feller bunchers had increased slightly throughout a period of time, increasing from 14.5% to 17.5%, in five years. In terms of trees fatality, areas with lower levels of mechanization in harvesting resulted in higher rate of trees fatality. For instance, in Eastern areas of the United States, research which compared the conventional and mechanized logging operations, indicated the number of injuries, when using the conventional approach, is three times greater than that of using the mechanized equipment such as a feller buncher. However, mechanized related injury could be raised accordingly, especially when performing machine maintenance or repair. These kinds of injuries could be serious and also costly.

== Limitations ==
Feller buncher could be highly productive and cost-effective but there are several limitations. Feller buncher is less beneficial when performing operations on a very rough and relatively steep land. For example, in Appalachian hardwood area, trees have heavy crowns and are grown on the steep slopes which requires tracked feller bunchers in the operations. Although tracked feller bunchers allow operations on a steep slope, the cost-effectiveness is not well studied. Also, manual felling can operate on the steeper slopes than the feller bunchers do. On the other hand, feller bunchers are cost-effective only when there is a high volume of trees in the operations. If there is not enough timber to harvest, the unit cost can be expensive, especially when the majority of the operation site is steep slopes. A 2013, University of Maine study suggests that the use of feller bunchers could cause medium to high level of stand damage from 7% to 25%. However, in comparison with other equipment such as harvesters, the damage that is caused by the feller bunchers is less severe.

== See also ==
- Woodchipper
- Harvester
- Skidder
- Logging truck
- Stump grinder
