= Forwarder =

Vehicle used in forestry

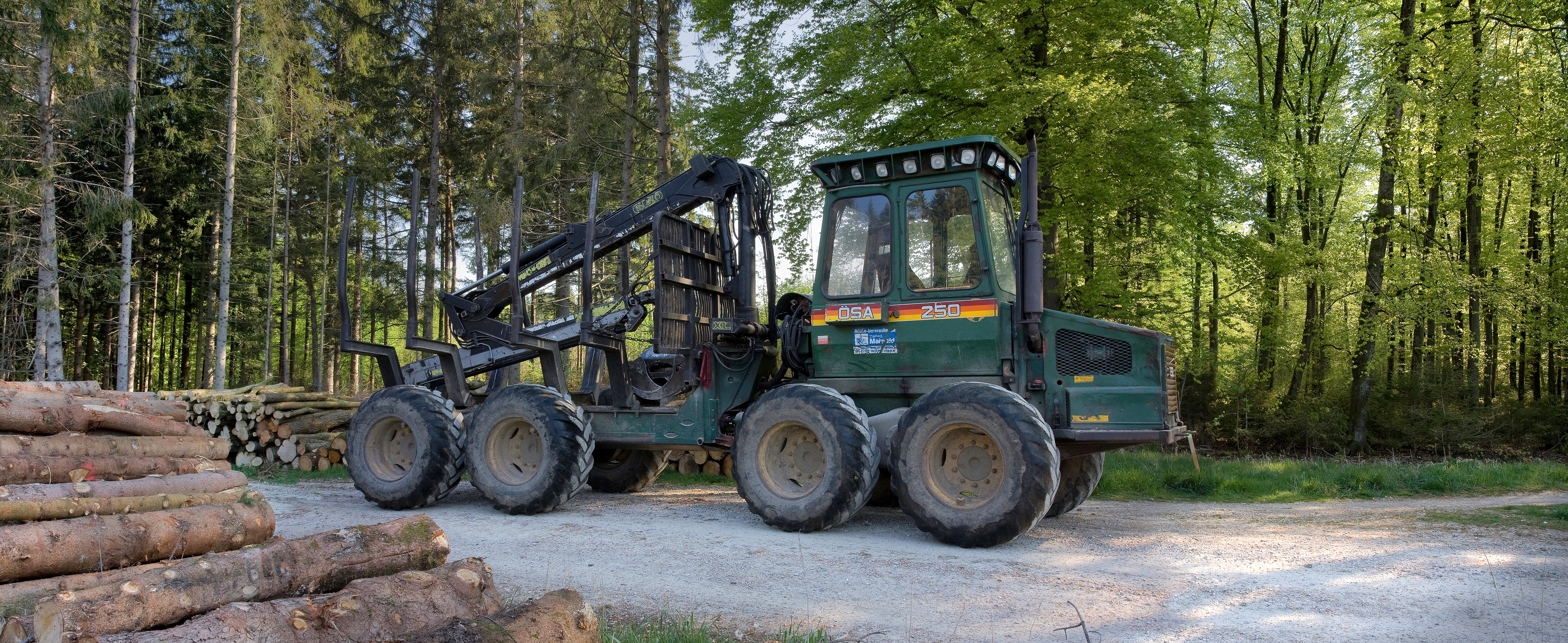
Forestry Forwarder Ösa 250.

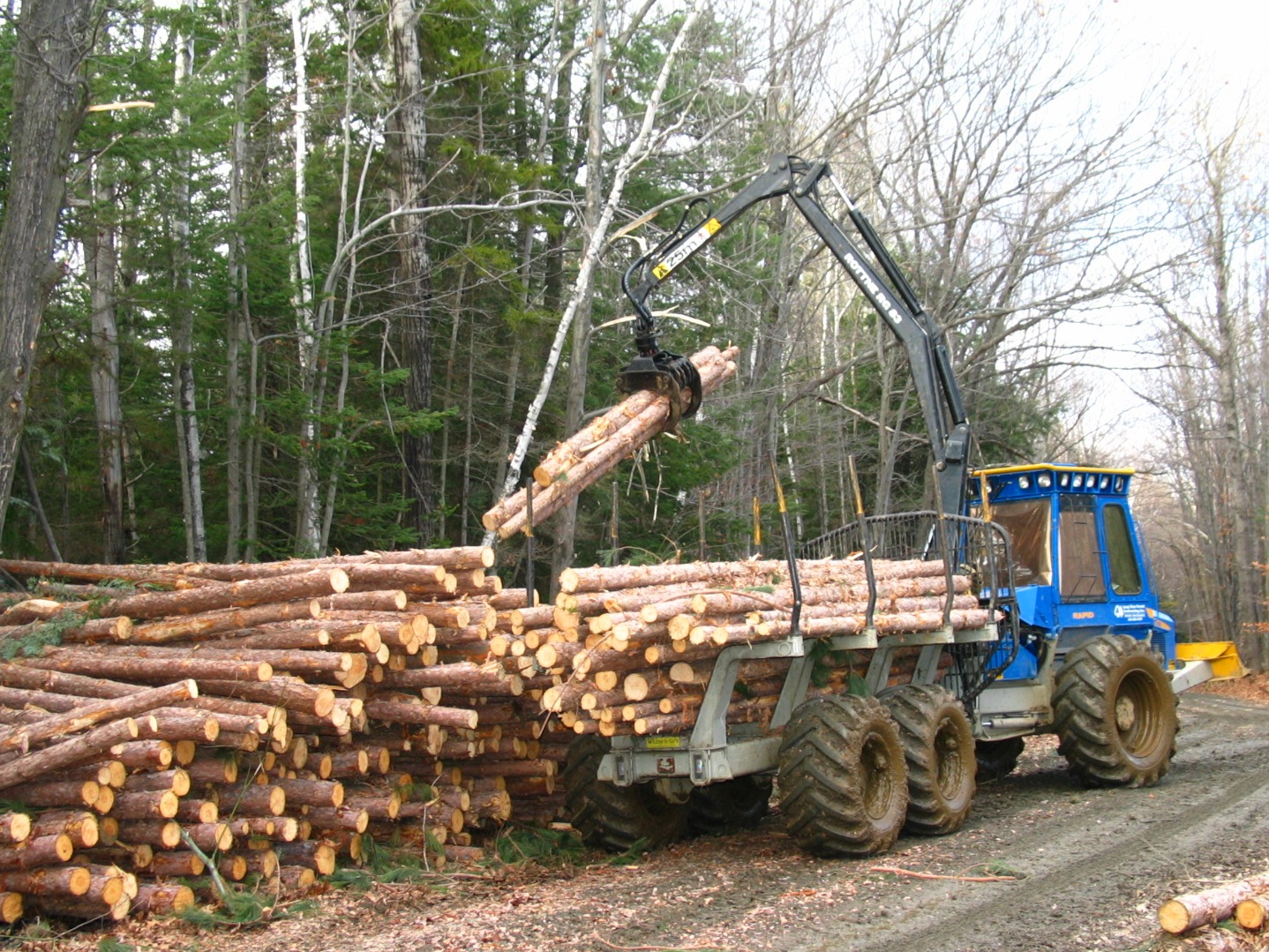
A medium-sized forwarder piling logs.

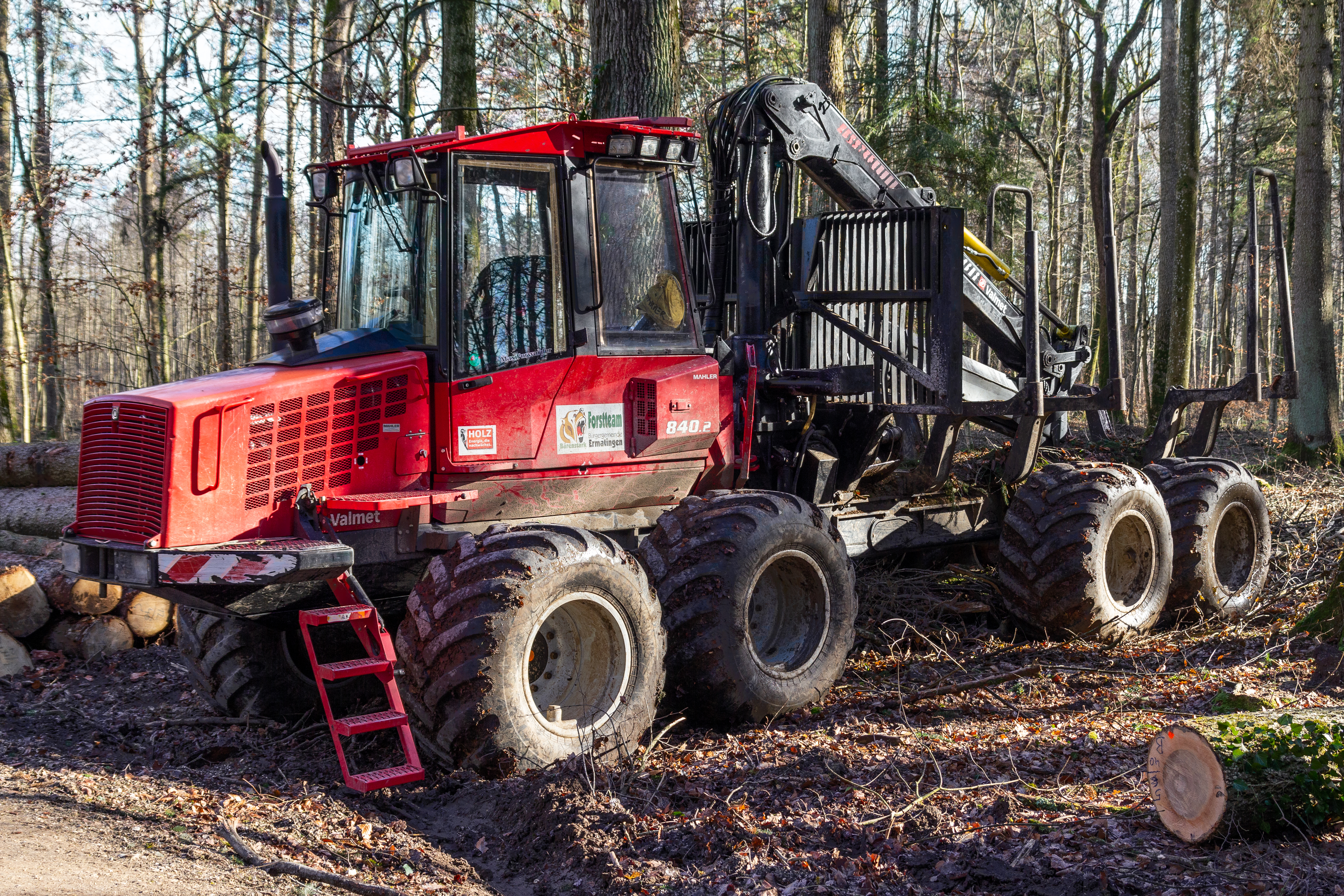
Valmet 840.2 Forwarder

A forwarder is a forestry vehicle that carries big felled logs cut by a harvester from the stump to a roadside landing for later acquisition. Forwarders can use rubber tires or tracks. Unlike a skidder, a forwarder carries logs clear of the ground, which can reduce soil impacts but tends to limit the size of the logs it can move. They are typically employed together with harvesters in cut-to-length logging operations. It originated in Scandinavia.

== Load capacity ==
Forwarders are commonly categorized by their load carrying capabilities. Other classifications include whether they are wheeled or tracked and the axle arrangement. The smallest are trailers designed for towing behind all-terrain vehicles which can carry a load between 1 and 3 tonnes. Agricultural self-loading trailers designed to be towed by farm tractors can handle load weights up to around 12 to 15 tonnes. Light weight purpose-built machines utilised in commercial logging and early thinning operations can handle payloads of up to 8 tonnes. Medium-sized forwarders used in clearfells and later thinnings carry between 12 and 16 tonnes. The largest class specialized for clearfells handles up to 25 tonnes. Forwarders also carry their load at least 2 feet above the ground.

== Manufacturers ==
- Barko Hydraulics, LLC
- Caterpillar Inc.
- John Deere (Timberjack)
- EcoLog
- Fabtek
- HSM Hohenloher Spezial-Maschinenbau
- Komatsu Forest (Valmet)
- Kronos
- Logset
- Malwa
- Neuson Forest
- PM Pfanzelt Maschinenbau
- Ponsse
- Rottne
- Strojirna Novotny
- Tigercat
- Timber Pro
- Zanello
- Morooka Co., LTD
