= Harvester (forestry) =

Type of forestry vehicle employed in logging operations

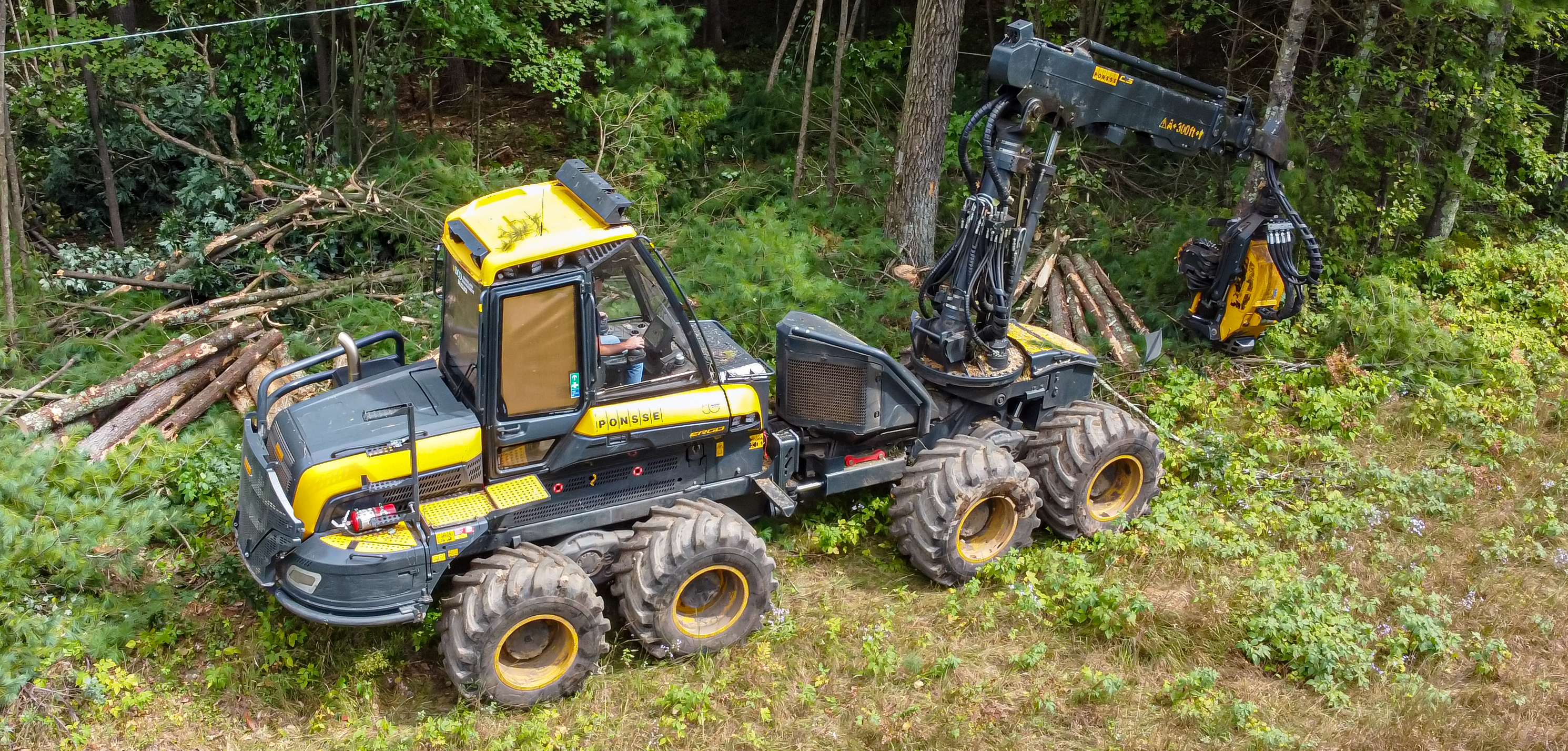
Tree harvester (Click for video)

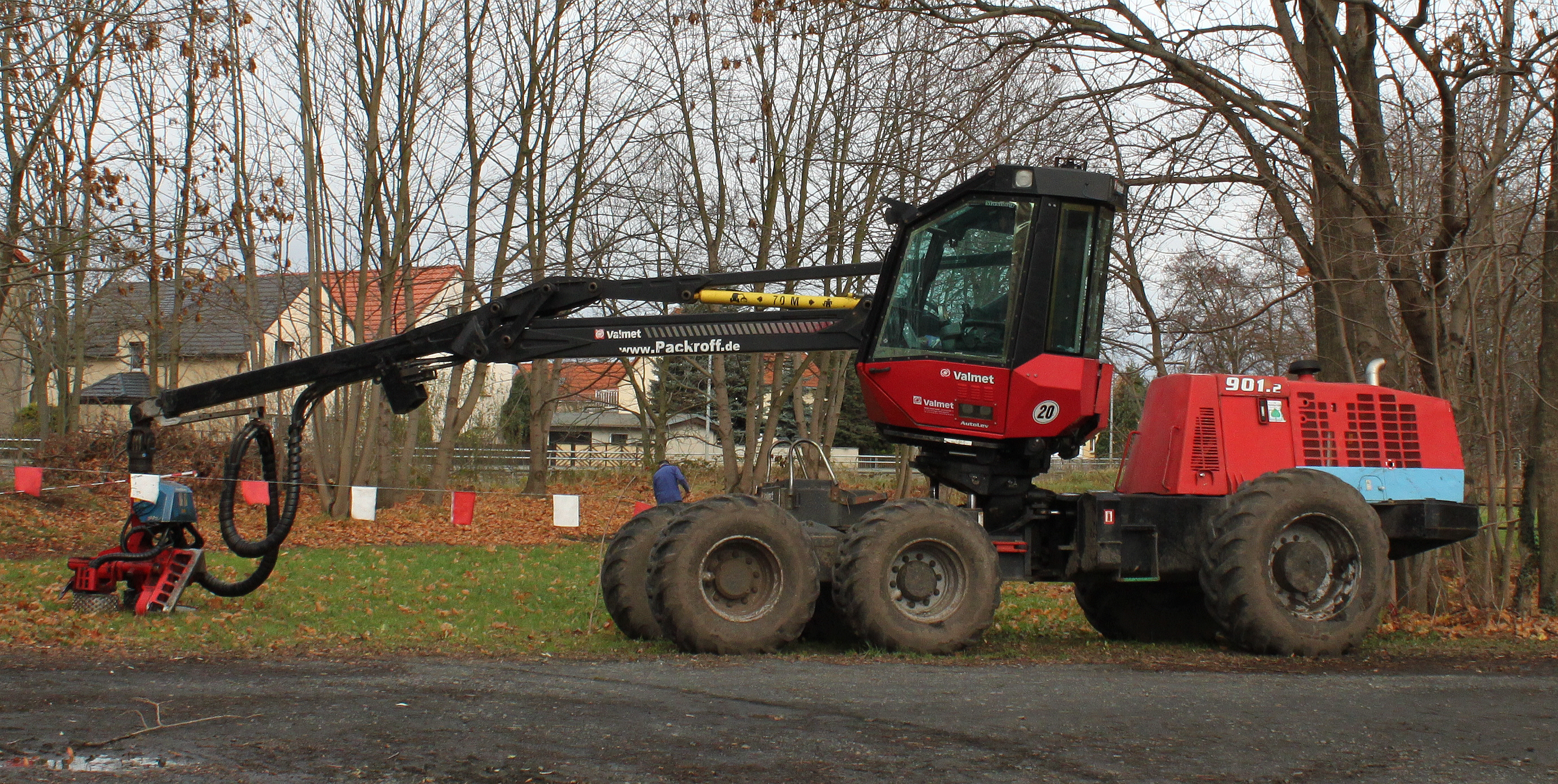
6-wheeled Valmet harvester

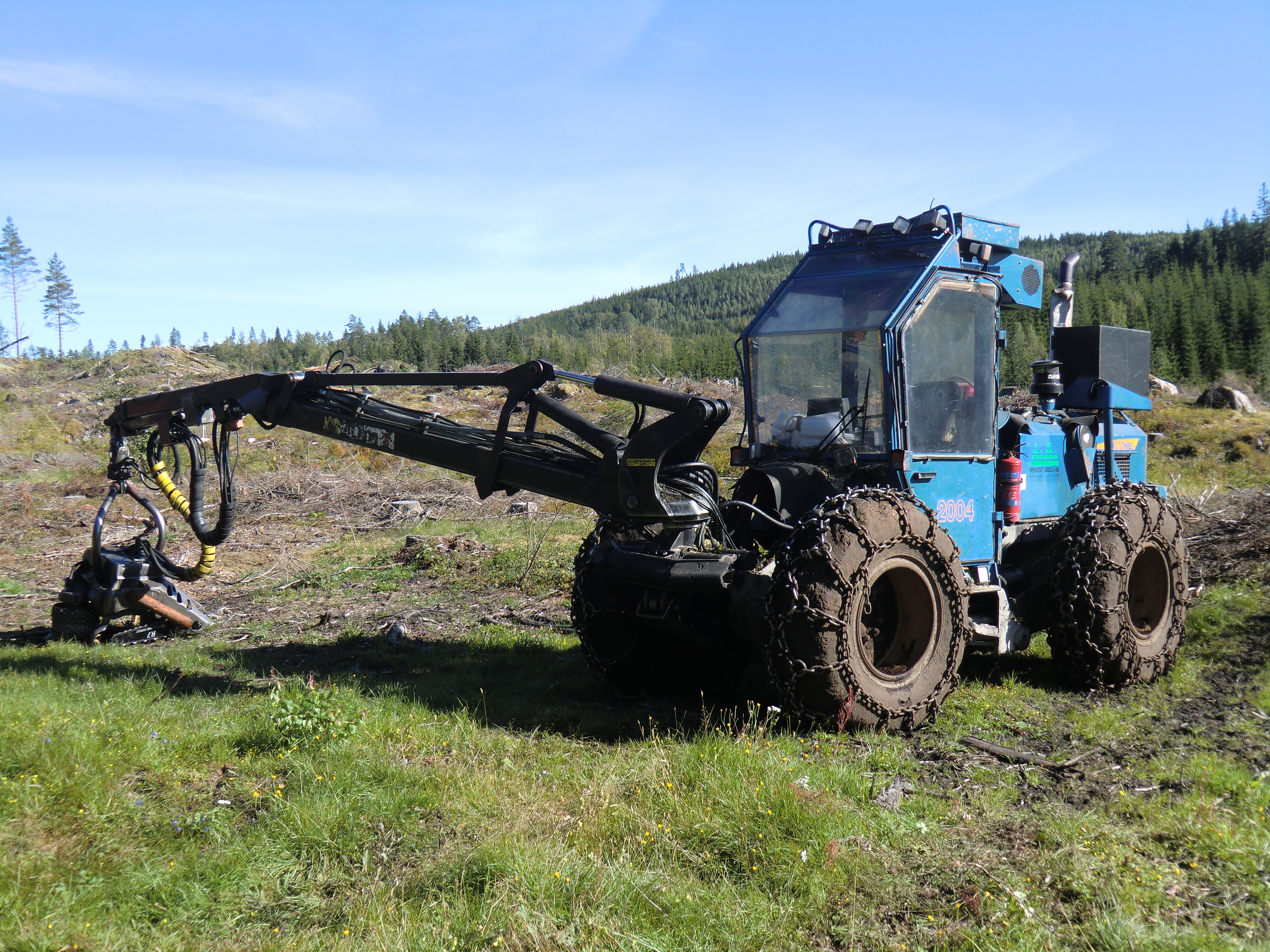
Small 4-wheeled Rottne harvester

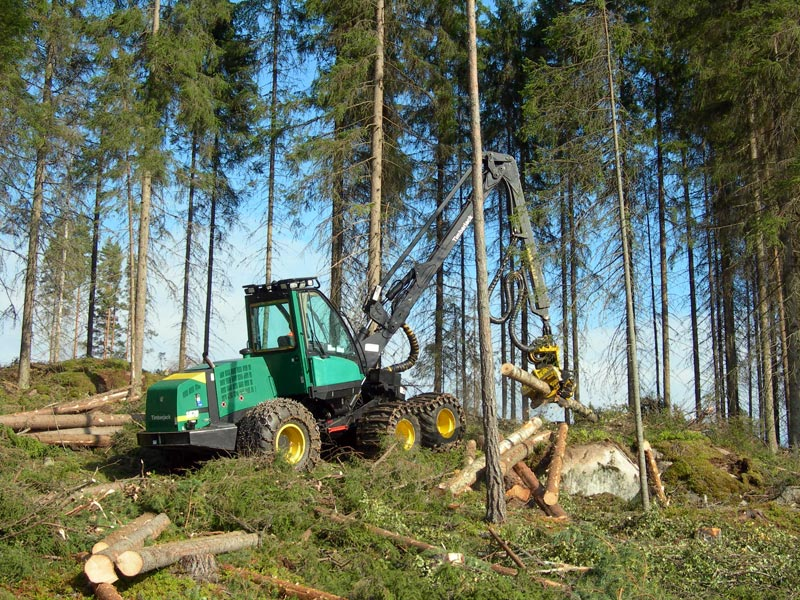
Timberjack harvester

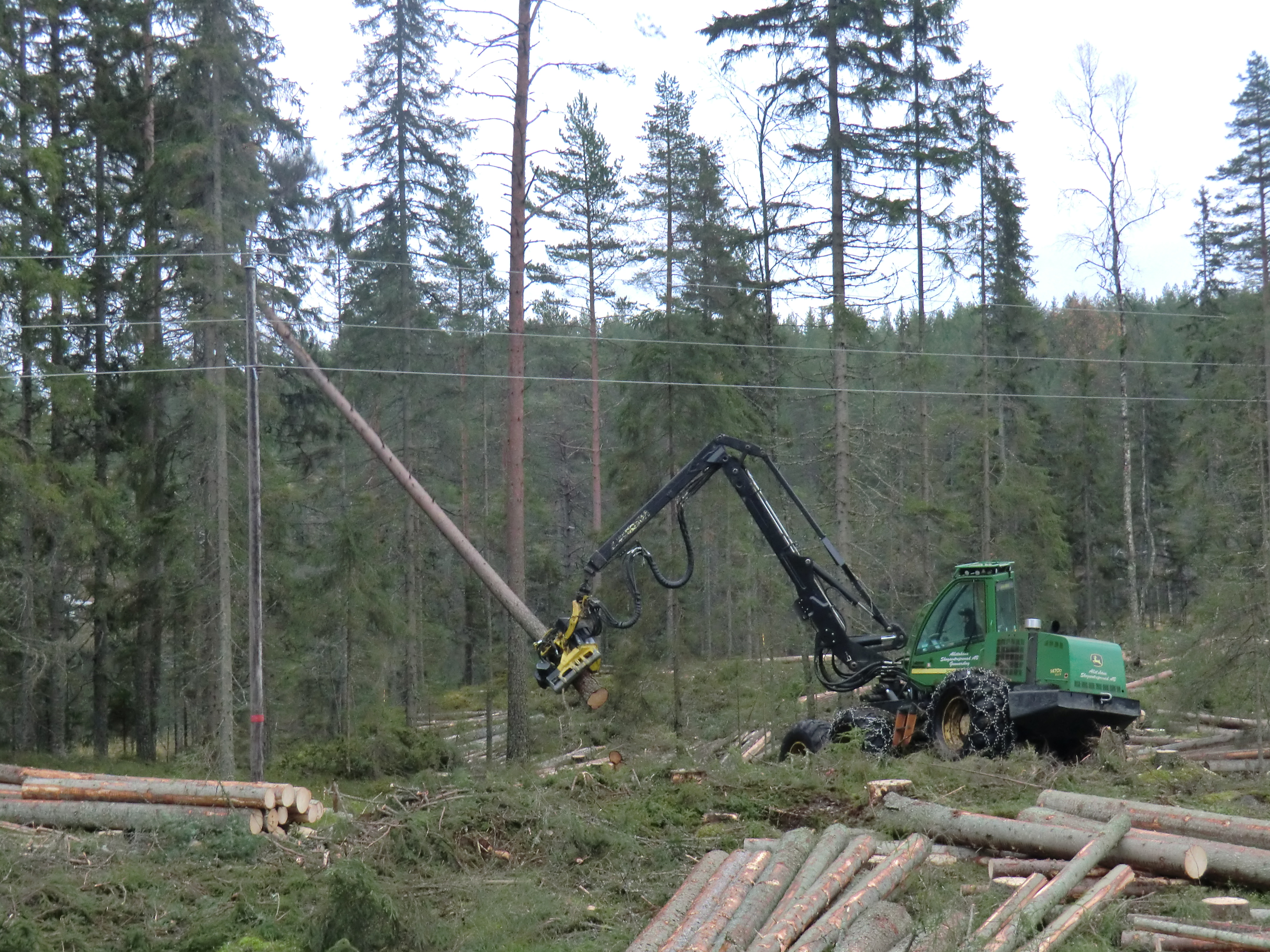
John Deere harvester in Sweden

A harvester is a type of heavy forestry vehicle employed in cut-to-length logging operations for felling, delimbing and bucking trees. A forest harvester is typically employed together with a skidder that hauls the logs to a roadside landing, or a forwarder to pick up and haul away.

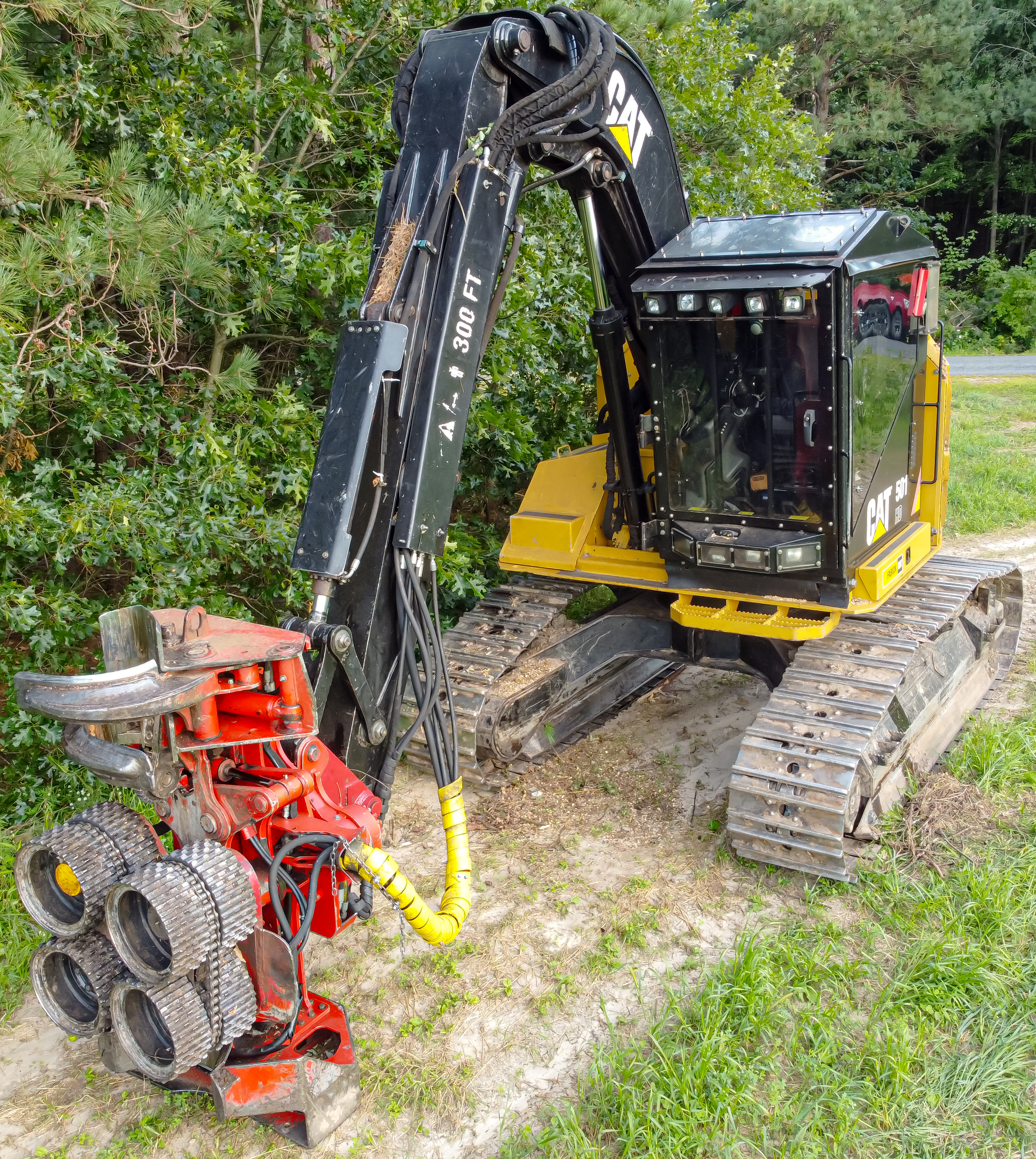
CAT 501 HD with tracked treads

== History ==
Forest harvesters were mainly developed in Sweden and Finland and today do practically all of the commercial felling in these countries. The first fully mobile timber "harvester", the PIKA model 75, was introduced in 1973 by Finnish systems engineer Sakari Pinomäki and his company PIKA Forest Machines. The first single grip harvester head was introduced in the early 1980s by Swedish company SP Maskiner. Their use has become widespread throughout the rest of Northern Europe, particularly in the harvesting of plantation forests.

Before modern harvesters were developed in Finland and Sweden, two inventors from Texas developed a crude tracked unit that sheared off trees at the base up to 0.76 meters (30 in) in diameter was developed in the US called The Mammoth Tree Shears. After shearing off the tree, the operator could use his controls to cause the tree to fall either to the right or left. Unlike a harvester, it did not delimb the tree after felling it.

== Uses ==
Harvesters are employed effectively in level to moderately steep terrain for clearcutting areas of forest. For very steep hills or for removing individual trees, ground crews working with chain saws are still preferred in some countries. In northern Europe small and manoeuvrable harvesters are used for thinning operations, manual felling is typically only used in extreme conditions, where tree size exceeds the capacity of the harvester head or by small woodlot owners.

The principle aimed for in mechanised logging is "no feet on the forest floor", and the harvester and forwarder allow this to be achieved. Keeping workers inside the driving cab of the machine provides a safer and more comfortable working environment for industrial scale logging.

Harvesters are built on a robust all-terrain vehicle, either wheeled, tracked, or on a walking excavator. The vehicle may be articulated to provide tight turning capability around obstacles. A diesel engine provides power for both the vehicle and the harvesting mechanism through hydraulic drive. An extensible, articulated boom, similar to that on an excavator, reaches out from the vehicle to carry the harvester head. Some harvesters are adaptations of excavators with a new harvester head, while others are purpose-built vehicles.

"Combi" machines are available which combine the felling capability of a harvester with the load-carrying capability of a forwarder, allowing a single operator and machine to fell, process and transport trees. These novel type of vehicles are only competitive in operations with short distances to the landing.

== Felling head ==
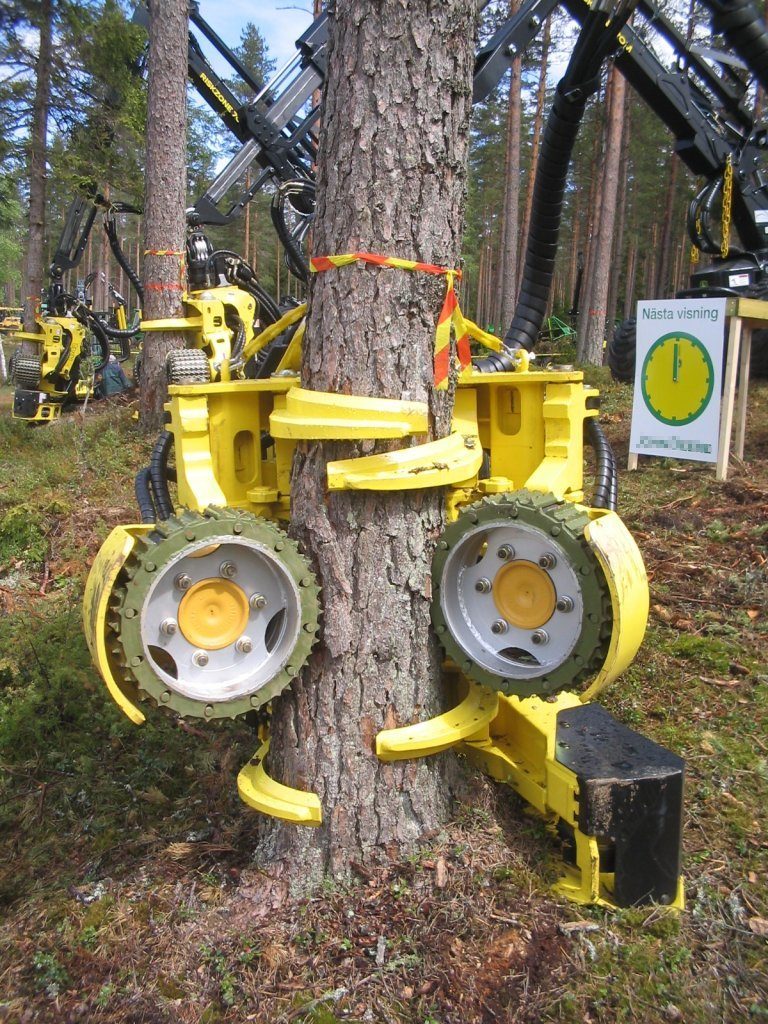
Harvester head

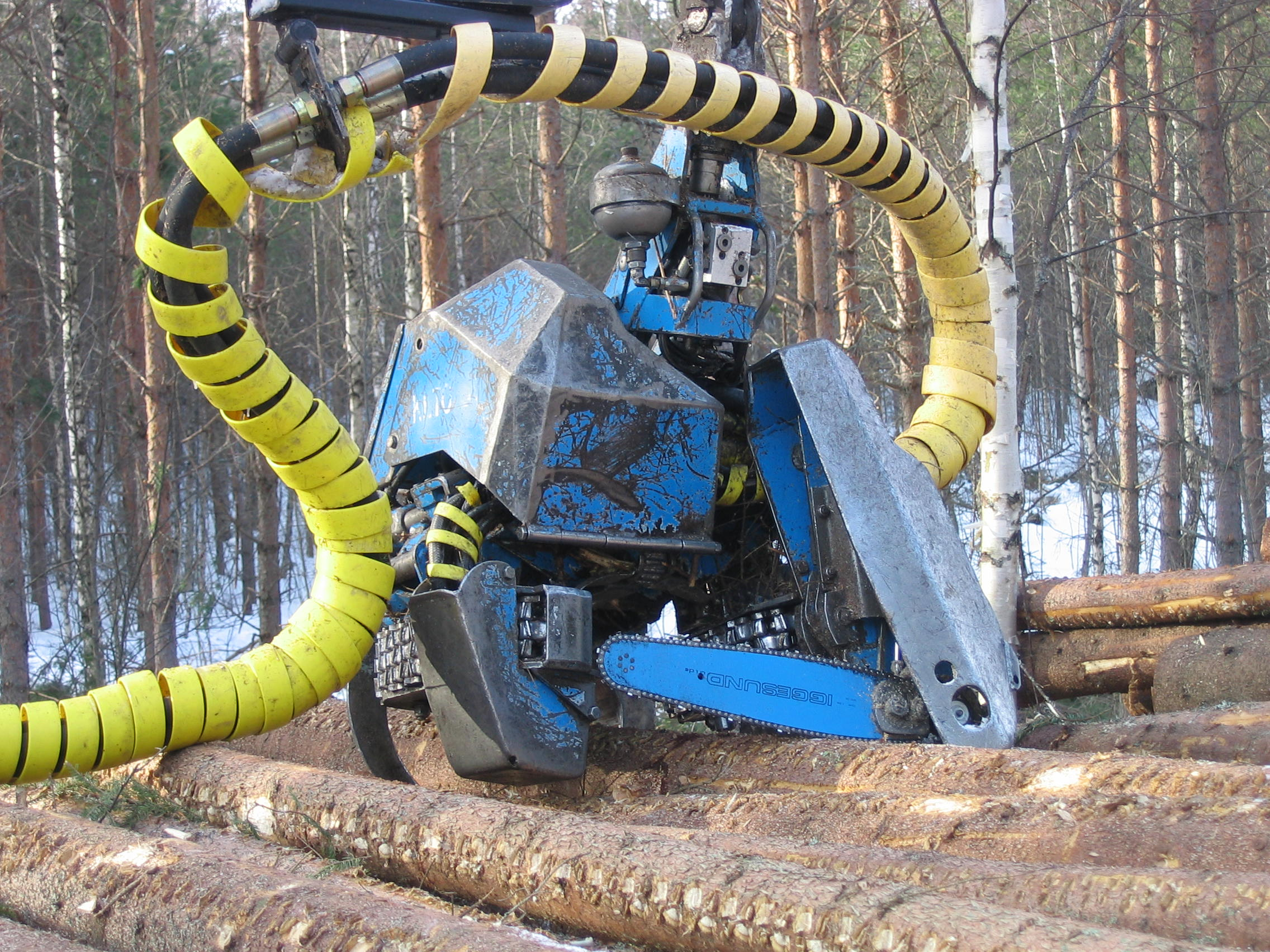
Harvester head, chainsaw visible

A typical harvester head consists of (from bottom to top, with head in vertical position)

- a chain saw to cut the tree at its base, and cut it to length. The saw is hydraulically powered, rather than using the 2-stroke engine of a portable version. It has a stronger chain and a higher power output than any saw a person can carry.
- two or more curved delimbing knives which reach around the trunk to remove branches.
- two feed rollers to grasp the tree. The wheels pivot apart to allow the harvester head to grasp the tree and pivot together to hug the tree tightly. The wheels are driven in rotation to force the cut tree stem through the delimbing knives.
- diameter sensors to calculate the volume of timber harvested in conjunction with
- a measuring wheel which measures the length of the stem as it is fed through the head.

One operator in the vehicle's cab can control all of these functions. A control computer can simplify mechanical movements and can keep records of the length and diameter of trees cut. Length is computed by either counting the rotations of the gripping wheels or, more commonly, using the measuring wheel. Diameter is computed from the pivot angle of the gripping wheels or delimbing knives when hugging the tree. Length measurement also can be used for automated cutting of the tree into predefined lengths. Computer software can predict the volume of each stem based on analysing stems harvested previously. This information when used in conjunction with price lists for each specific log specification enables the optimisation of log recovery from the stem.

Harvesters are routinely available for cutting trees up to 900 millimetres (35 in) in diameter, built on vehicles weighing up to 20 metric tons (20 long tons; 22 short tons), with a boom reaching up to 10 metres (33 ft) radius. Larger, heavier vehicles do more damage to the forest floor, but a longer reach helps by allowing harvesting of more trees with fewer vehicle movements.

The approximate equivalent type of vehicle in full-tree logging systems are feller-bunchers.

== Manufacturers ==
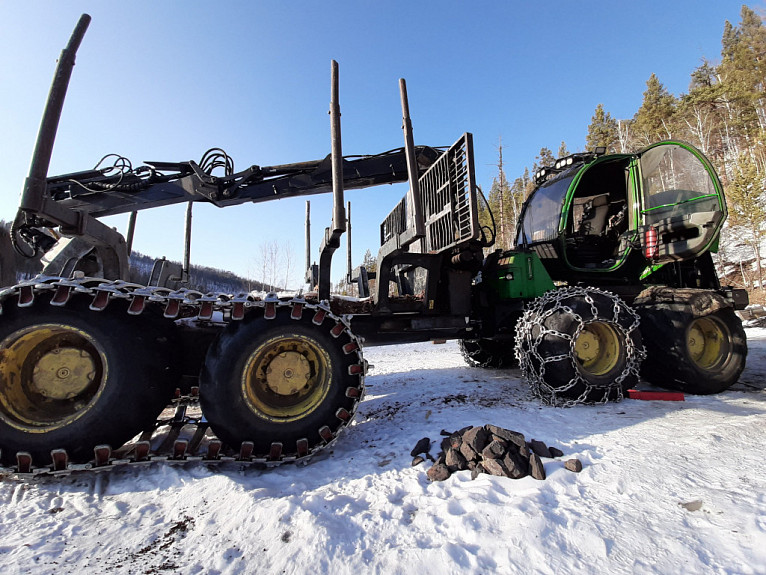
Logging complex (harvester) at work. Buryatia, Russia

- NEUSON Forest
- Rottne
- Logset
- EcoLog
- Kone Ketonen
- AFM-Forest
- Barko Hydraulics
- Caterpillar
- Komatsu Forest
- Ponsse
- SP Maskiner
- Tigercat
- Timberjack (owned by John Deere)
- John Deere
- Kesla Oyj
- Prosilva
- Sampo-Rosenlew
