= Vieremä =

- Municipality
- Vieremän kunta Vieremä kommun
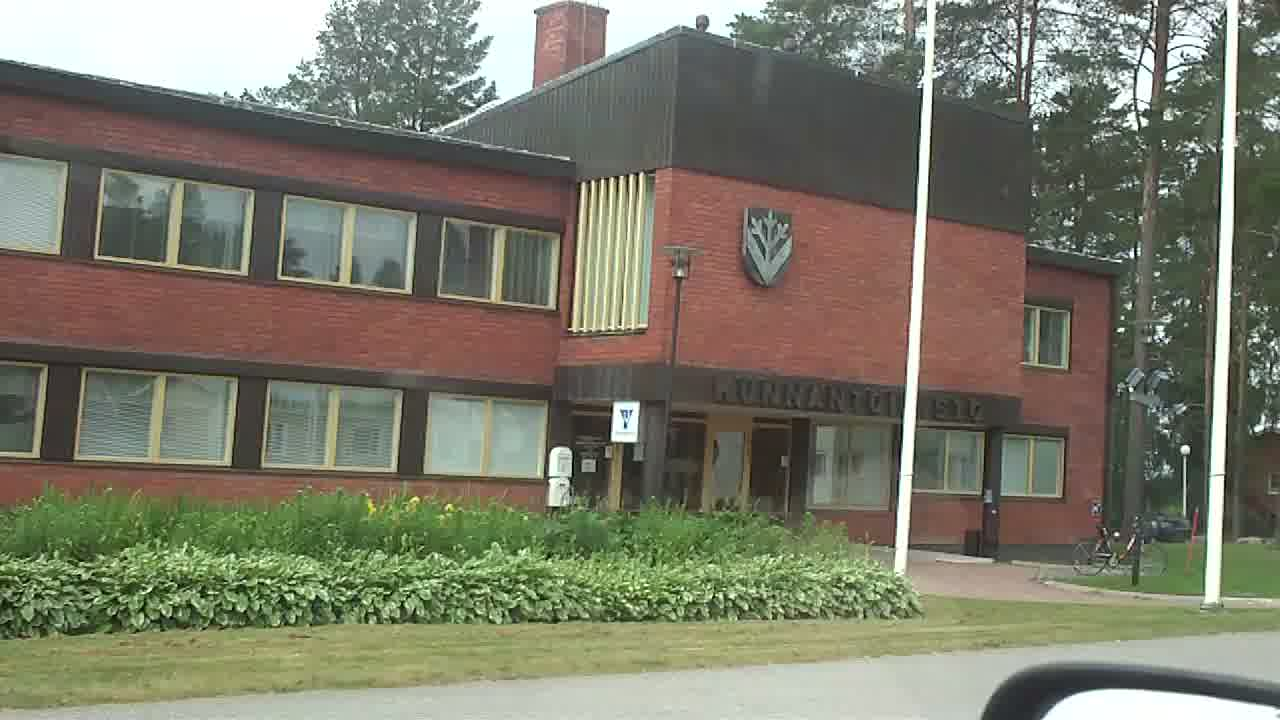
- Vieremä town hall

- Coat of arms

- Location of Vieremä in Finland
- Interactive map of Vieremä
- Coordinates: 63°44.5′N 027°00′E
- Country: Finland
- Region: North Savo
- Sub-region: Upper Savo
- Charter: 1922

Government
  - Municipal manager: Mika Suomalainen

Area (2018-01-01)
  - Total: 973.35 km^{2} (375.81 sq mi)
  - Land: 925.28 km^{2} (357.25 sq mi)
  - Water: 48.2 km^{2} (18.6 sq mi)
  - Rank: 83rd largest in Finland

Population (2025-12-31)
  - Total: 3,295
  - Rank: 205th largest in Finland
  - Density: 3.56/km^{2} (9.2/sq mi)

Population by native language
  - Finnish: 95.3% (official)
  - Others: 4.7%

Population by age
  - 0 to 14: 14.5%
  - 15 to 64: 58.1%
  - 65 or older: 27.5%
- Time zone: UTC+02:00 (EET)
  - Summer (DST): UTC+03:00 (EEST)
- Website: vierema.fi

Vieremä is a municipality of Finland in the North Savo region. The municipality has a population of 3,295 (31 December 2025) and covers an area of 973.35 square kilometres (375.81 sq mi) of which 48.2 km^{2} (18.6 sq mi) is water. The population density is 3.56 inhabitants per square kilometre (9.2/sq mi).

Municipality is unilingually Finnish.

Ponsse, one of the world’s largest forest machine manufacturers is headquartered in Vieremä.

== History ==
Municipality of Vieremä was founded in 1922. Before it, Vieremä was a part of Iisalmen maalaiskunta.

== Geography ==
Neighbouring municipalities are Iisalmi, Kajaani, Kiuruvesi, Pyhäntä, and Sonkajärvi.

=== Villages ===
- Valkeiskylä
- Kaarakkala
- Karankamäki
- Kirkonkylä
- Rotimojoki
- Nissilä,
- Palosenjärvi
- Palosenmäki
- Pyöree
- Salahmi
- Savimäki

=== Climate ===
Climate data for Vieremä (1991-2020 normals, extremes 1959-present)
Month	Jan	Feb	Mar	Apr	May	Jun	Jul	Aug	Sep	Oct	Nov	Dec	Year
Record high °C (°F)	7.9 (46.2)	9.2 (48.6)	13.3 (55.9)	21.9 (71.4)	29.8 (85.6)	31.1 (88.0)	33.8 (92.8)	33.2 (91.8)	25.8 (78.4)	19.0 (66.2)	11.1 (52.0)	6.5 (43.7)	33.8 (92.8)
Mean daily maximum °C (°F)	−6.1 (21.0)	−5.7 (21.7)	−0.7 (30.7)	5.6 (42.1)	12.9 (55.2)	18.0 (64.4)	20.6 (69.1)	18.2 (64.8)	12.3 (54.1)	4.7 (40.5)	−0.6 (30.9)	−3.8 (25.2)	6.3 (43.3)
Daily mean °C (°F)	−8.8 (16.2)	−8.6 (16.5)	−4.1 (24.6)	1.7 (35.1)	8.2 (46.8)	13.3 (55.9)	16.1 (61.0)	13.9 (57.0)	8.7 (47.7)	2.4 (36.3)	−2.6 (27.3)	−6.1 (21.0)	2.8 (37.1)
Mean daily minimum °C (°F)	−11.5 (11.3)	−11.4 (11.5)	−7.3 (18.9)	−1.9 (28.6)	3.8 (38.8)	9.0 (48.2)	12.1 (53.8)	10.4 (50.7)	5.8 (42.4)	0.3 (32.5)	−4.6 (23.7)	−8.4 (16.9)	−0.3 (31.4)
Record low °C (°F)	−33.9 (−29.0)	−35.6 (−32.1)	−25.3 (−13.5)	−19.2 (−2.6)	−8.2 (17.2)	−3.7 (25.3)	3.2 (37.8)	−0.9 (30.4)	−7.4 (18.7)	−19.4 (−2.9)	−25.8 (−14.4)	−32.9 (−27.2)	−35.6 (−32.1)
Average precipitation mm (inches)	50 (2.0)	43 (1.7)	41 (1.6)	35 (1.4)	56 (2.2)	77 (3.0)	90 (3.5)	75 (3.0)	68 (2.7)	68 (2.7)	65 (2.6)	62 (2.4)	730 (28.7)
Average precipitation days (≥ 0.1mm)	18	16	14	12	14	15	14	15	15	17	19	19	188
Source 1: Finnish Meteorological Institute
Source 2: https://kilotavu.com/asema-taulukko.php?asema=101726

== Vieremä Music ==
Vieremä has an active musical life, despite its small size. Vieremä has long traditions in folk and religious music, and it is especially known for its active kantele-playing scene. A kantele camp for young players is organized every summer, and Vieremä church and Kyrönniemi Center of Culture and Religion host many concerts throughout the year.

Notable music groups

- The Vieremä Veteran Choir often tours Finland and released a CD in 2004.
- Vieremän Kanteletytöt (Vieremä Kantele Girls) is one of Finland's most well-known kantele groups.

== Notable people ==
- Iivo Niskanen
- Kerttu Niskanen
- Eva Ryynänen
