= Ponsse =

Finnish company manufacturing forestry vehicles and machinery

Ponsse Plc
- Native name: Ponsse Oyj
- Type: Julkinen osakeyhtiö
- Traded as: Nasdaq Helsinki: PON1V
- Industry: Heavy equipment
- Founded: 1970; 56 years ago
- Founder: Einari Vidgrén
- Headquarters: Vieremä, Finland
- Key people: Juho Nummela (CEO); Jarmo Vidgrén (chairman)
- Products: Forwarders, harvesters
- Revenue: ▼€750.4 million (2024)
- Operating income: ▼€36.8 million (2024)
- Net income: ▼€12.5 million (2024)
- Total assets: ▼€563.1 million (2024)
- Total equity: ▲€327.2 million (2024)
- Number of employees: 2,024 (2024)
- Website: www.ponsse.com

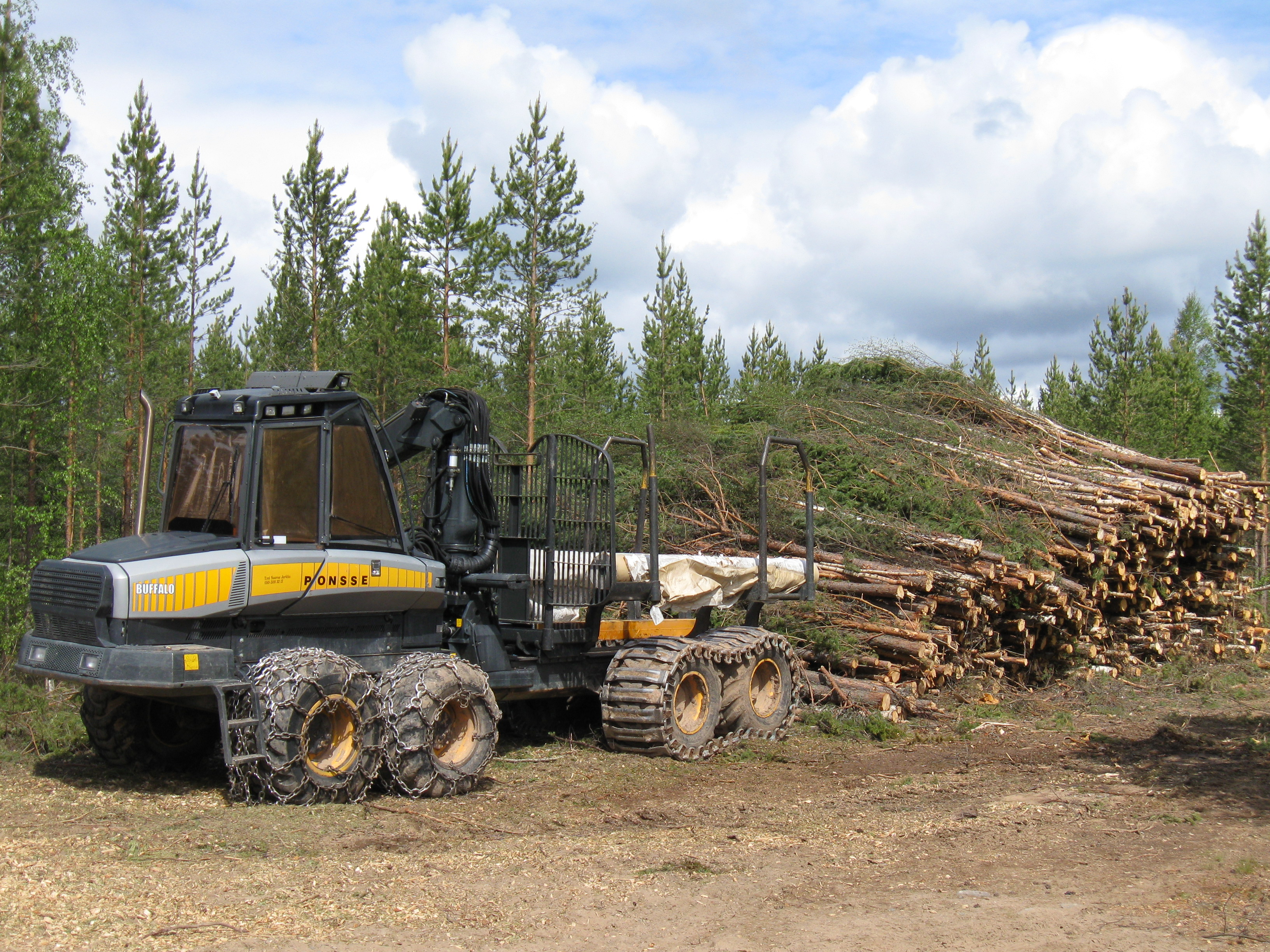
Ponsse Buffalo forwarder

Ponsse Plc (Finnish: Ponsse Oyj) is a company domiciled in Finland that manufactures and markets a range of forestry vehicles and machinery such as forwarders and harvesters. The Ponsse company was established by the forest machine entrepreneur Einari Vidgrén in 1970. As of 2024, Ponsse's machines are used at logging sites in approximately 40 countries, and 74 per cent of the company's net sales come from exports. All machines are manufactured in the company's birthplace in Vieremä. Ponsse Group employs more than 2,000 people in 12 countries, and the company's shares are quoted on the NASDAQ OMX Nordic List.

== History ==
=== 1970s – Early years ===
Entrepreneur Einari Vidgrén receives encouraging feedback on machines he has built. He decides to set up a forest machine factory in Vieremä. However, help is required by the municipality of Vieremä in order to finance the project. A meeting is held by the municipal council, and they vote on the matter. The council approves the proposal with a majority of a single vote. The work is completed by the end of 1970, and Ponsse Plc is established as a result.

In 1971, Vidgrén places an ad in the Helsingin Sanomat news paper in order to recruit an engineer for the factory. An application by Jouko Kelppe, a young engineer from Salo, attracts the most attention. Kelppe is hired to be the first ever engineer in the history of Ponsse. The manufacturing of the first machine is started in the spring of 1971. A forest machine contractor Eero Vainikainen is in the process of purchasing a Volvo or Valmet machine. However, after strong persuasion and visiting the Ponsse factory, he decides to buy the first ever Ponsse machine. The machine is driven out of the factory by Vidgrén in the autumn of 1971.

Ponsse premieres in the international markets in 1974. A massive storm hits Germany, and a large number of foreign equipment is needed for harvesting the trees felled by the storm. Vidgrén hears that the job is well compensated, and sets out to Germany, accompanied by Finnish loggers and a Ponsse machine.

=== 1980s – Growth and innovation, Ponsse is sold ===
Mechanized harvesting is increasing worldwide, and heavy machinery is becoming a talking point. The public demands lighter and more eco-friendly machines. Ponsse releases a new model S 15 forwarder in 1983. The machine is highly advanced at the time, as it is lighter but is still able to carry heavy loads, as well as function on soil with poor bearing capacity.

Vidgrén is not satisfied with the grapples, or harvester heads, used in Ponsse machines. He wants Ponsse to make their own harvester heads. The first product, H520 is not completely trouble-free, and causes many problems for the company. Learning from these mistakes, a new model called H60 is released at the end of 1985. This marks an important step in the expansion of the product family.

On 16 December 1988, Ponsse's entire share capital is transferred to the industrial company called Interpolator Oy, a part of SKOP Group. This makes Ponsse a part of Norcar Group, along with some earlier acquisitions. Vidgrén becomes a board member of Norcar Group, and his brother, Esa Vidgrén, is appointed as the managing director of Ponsse Plc.

=== 1990s – Globalization, Einari Vidgrén buys Ponsse back ===
The computerized Kajaani 2000 loader control system represents the latest trend in the product development of forest machine control systems. In 1992, Ponsse releases two new machines, the HS10 harvester and the S10 forwarder. Einari Vidgrén receives the Finnish National Inventor Prize awarded by the Ministry of Trade and Industry, in recognition of his persistent work in the forest machine development.

A group of investors led by Vidgrén purchase Ponsse back from SKOP Group in February 1993. Kajaanin Automatiikka Ky, a company manufacturing information systems in Kajaani, is merged with Ponsse. As a result, Ponsse Opti is launched. Ponsse becomes the first forest machine manufacturer in the world to introduce a PC-based measuring device system in their machines. As a result, Ponsse is rewarded with an ISO 9000 certification, the first forest machine manufacturer to do so.

The expansion continues, as the first subsidiary, Ponsse AB, is established in Västerås, Sweden, in 1994. As the globalization increases, and Ponsse is getting attention from the international markets, subsidiaries are established also in the United States, France, and United Kingdom. A corporate development also happens, when the public quotation of Ponsse Plc shares on the Helsinki Stock Exchange begins in 1995. Two new harvester models are released in 1996, Ergo HS16 and Cobra HS10.

=== 2000s – Aggressive product development, 2008 financial crisis ===
Ponsse's 30th anniversary party is organized in 2000, and the occasion is used to announce a brand new product family with Mercedes-Benz engines. The new Beaver harvester is launched, as well as a new digital control system, called OptiControl. New retailer is established in New Brunswick and Quebec, Canada. The Finnish Forest Association grants Einari Vidgrén a golden medal for his special and long-term contribution to the forest industry in Finland in 2001. The following reasons are given for the selection: "Einari Vidgrén is awarded for his unique entrepreneurship, which led to one of the world's leading manufacturing companies of forest machinery being established in Finland. When Vidgrén noticed that the machines manufactured by others were not satisfactory, he decided to build one himself".

Ponsse Road Show is organized as Vidgrén's 60th year celebration tour in 2003. The tour travels through ten locations in Finland, presenting machines and meeting customers across the country. The 3,000th manufactured Ponsse machine is handed out during the tour. New product line is launched in 2004, including Remote Service, the first ever real-time remote service connection in the forest machine industry. Ponsse establishes a subsidiary in Russia, as well as a retail agreement in Quebec, Canada. Ponsse becomes the main owner of Epec Oy, a control system manufacturer in Seinäjoki. Ponsse Ladies is founded.

Vidgrén creates a foundation bearing his name is 2005. The purpose of the foundation is to make the entrepreneurship related to wood harvesting better known, and increase the awareness of the mechanized harvesting industry, especially among the younger generation. The factory in Vieremä is expanded, and a new service center is established in Iisalmi. Several sponsorship deals are announced, including the javelin thrower Tero Pitkämäki, WRC-driver Mikko Hirvonen, and ice hockey team Kalpa. Another subsidiary, Ponsse Latin America, is established in Brazil, and a retail agreement in South Africa. New Bear harvester and Elephant forwarder are introduced in 2006.

International Road Show tour is organized in 2007. The tour travels through various locations across Europe. Ponsse begins cooperation with the Moscow State University. The goal is to offer extensive training in the cut-to-length logging method. A subsidiary is established in China. Almost 30,000 visitors from all over the world are gathered in Metko exhibition, the biggest forestry event in Finland, in September 2008. The Great Recession and the 2008 financial crisis put a heavy strain on the forest industry. Due to weakened demand and the future prospects for the forest machine industry, Ponsse gives summons for employee cooperation negotiations.

=== 2010s – Einari Vidgrén passes away, new generation ===
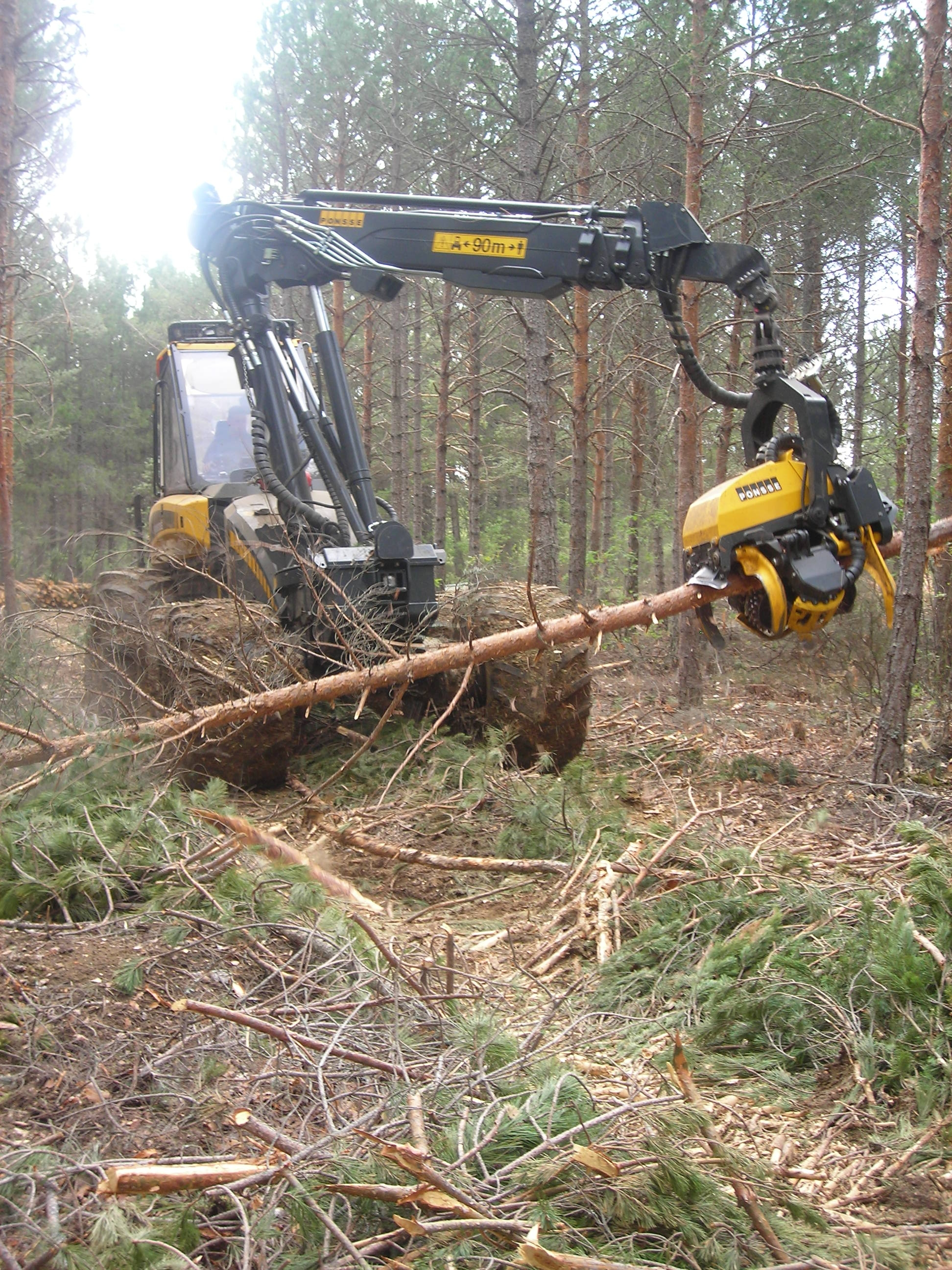
Ponsse Scorpion

Einari Vidgrén suddenly died at the age of 67 on 26 October 2010. The Board of Directors at Ponsse were forced to reorganize due to the sudden loss of their Chairman. Vidgrén's four sons became the primary shareowners of the company, and Juha Vidgrén was unanimously selected as the new Chairman of the Board.

Epec Oy, a forest machine application and product development firm based in Kajaani, is transferred to Ponsse in 2011. This enables for a stronger development in the information systems for the forest machines. In 2012, the President of Finland, Sauli Niinistö visits the Ponsse factory. The 10,000th Ponsse machine is manufactured in 2015. The following year, Ponsse announces 32 million euro investments on their factory in Vieremä. In 2018, Ponsse was named the most reputable company in Finland, according to the survey conducted by T-Media.

== 2020s ==
In 2024, Ponsse employed about 2,000 people worldwide, and its machines operate in over 40 different countries. The company's exports account for 74% of revenue. Total revenue in 2024 was 750.4 million euros, and operating profit was 36.8 million euros.

== Products ==
Ponsse manufactures and sells a variety of forestry equipment, such as harvesters, forwarders, and harvester heads. Every product is manufactured at the company's headquarters in Vieremä, Finland.

Product type	Model	Model	Model	Model	Model	Model
Harvester	Ponsse Fox	Ponsse Bear	Ponsse Scorpion	Ponsse Cobra	Ponsse ScorpionKing	Ponsse Ergo
Forwarder	Ponsse Wisent	Ponsse Elk	Ponsse Buffalo	Ponsse Bison	Ponsse Elephant	Ponsse ElephantKing
Harvester head	Ponsse H5	Ponsse H6	Ponsse H7	Ponsse H7 Euca	Ponsse H8 HD Euca	Ponsse H10
