= Timberjack =

Logging Machinery Manufacturer

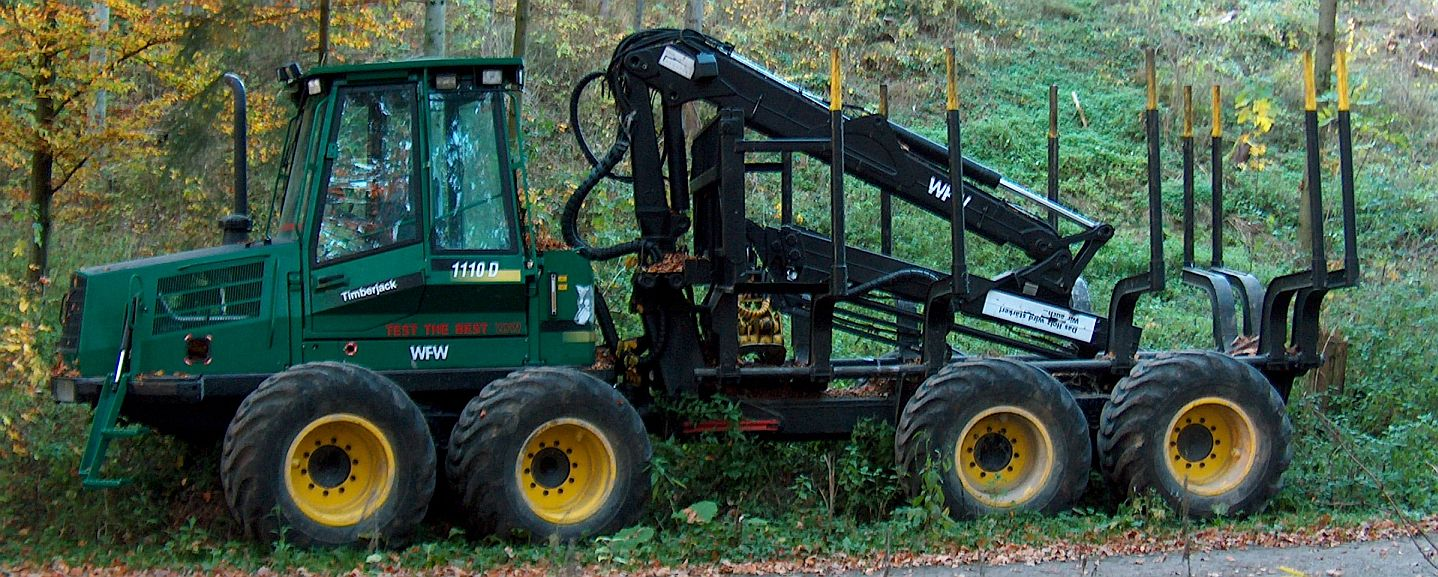
Forwarder Timberjack 1110D

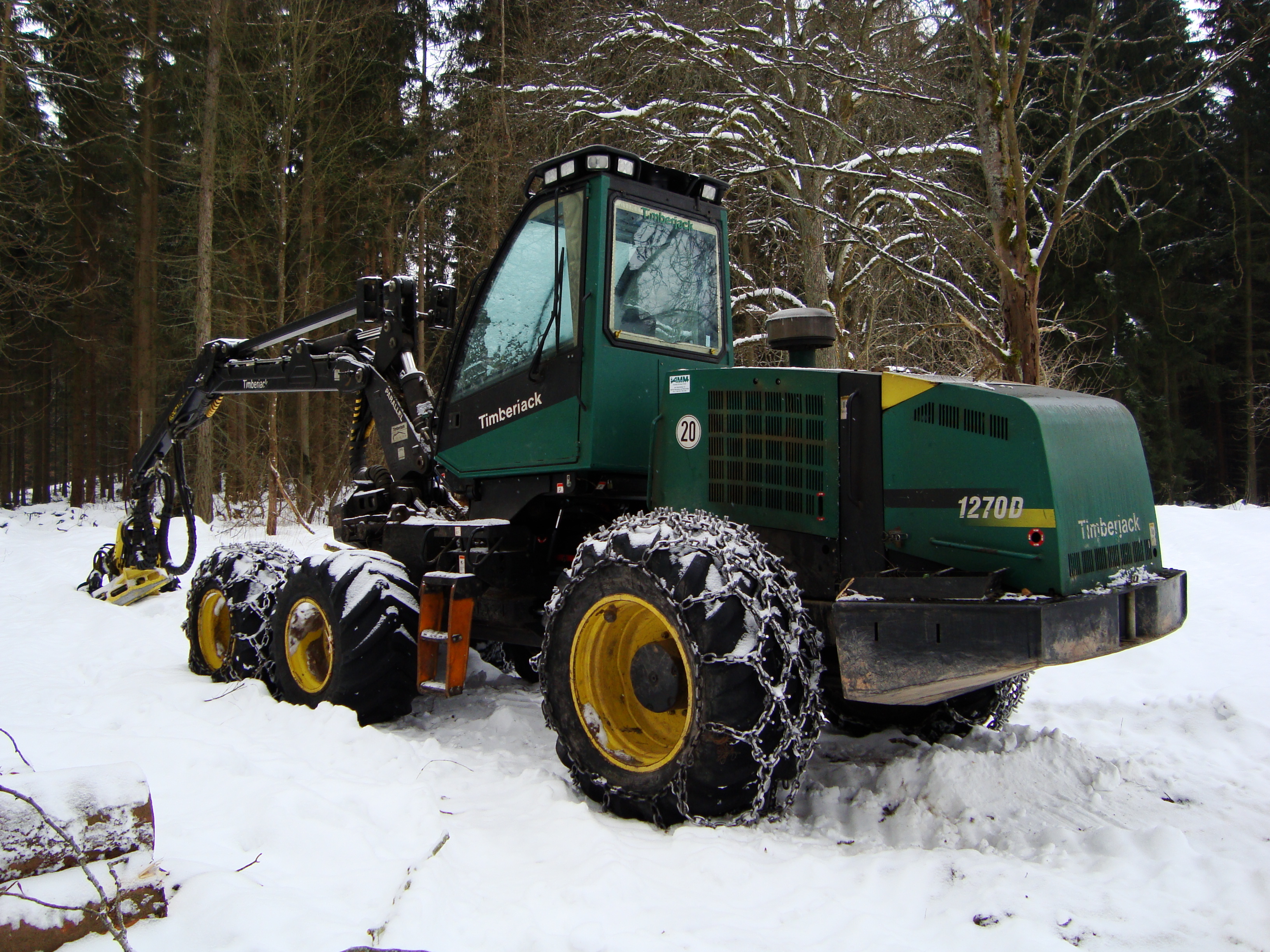
Harvester Timberjack 1270D

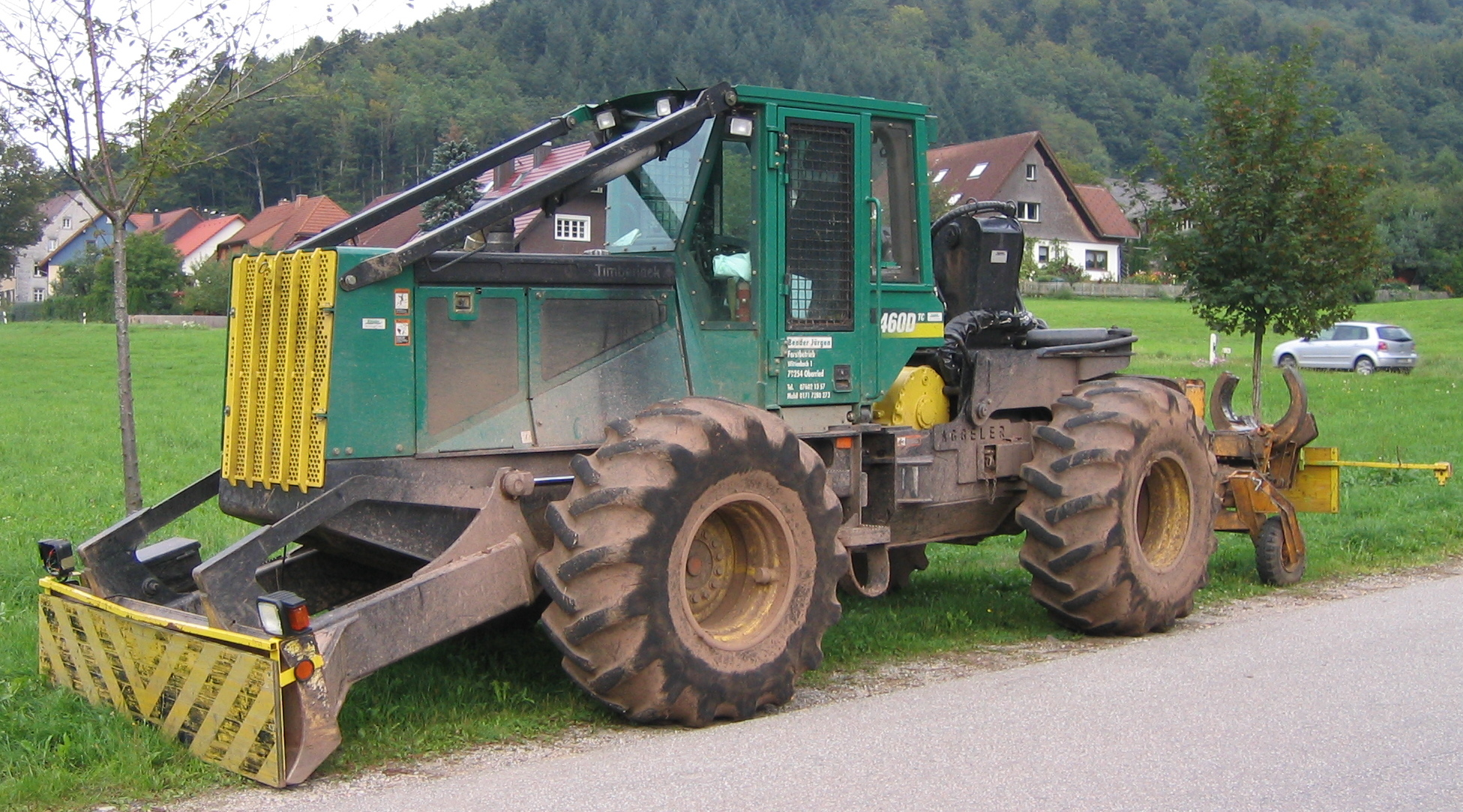
Skidder Timberjack 460D^{TC}

Timberjack is a manufacturer of forestry machinery for both cut-to-length and whole tree logging, and was a subsidiary of John Deere from 2000 to 2006.

== History ==
Timberjack was founded in Woodstock, Ontario, in the 1950s by Wes Magill and Robert Simmons, who designed an articulated four-wheel drive tractor with a winch at the back. They produced a prototype and production took off from there. There were affiliations with King Trailer ind. and with Timberland Ellicott Corp. before Eaton Corporation purchased Timberjack and named it the Forestry Equipment Division. The traditional color of all Timberjack products was a reddish orange. In 1992, the color was changed to green with black and yellow trim. John Deere purchased Timberjack and continued the green, black and yellow paint scheme. Timberjack was owned by the Eaton Corporation in the 1960s, 1970s and early 1980s. In 1984 Timberjack made a leveraged buyout from Eaton to become an independent company.

Timberjack was acquired by FMG (ForestMachineGroup), owned by Finnish Rauma-Repola. After a short period carrying the double-name FMG-Timberjack, in 1993 Timberjack became the brandname for the group. Other well known forest machine brands, which have been incorporated into FMG-Timberjack were Swedish Kockums, ÖSA and Bruun System as well as Finnish LOKOMO. In December 1999, John Deere announced they were purchasing Timberjack, the deal was finalized in April 2000. Timberjack products produced by Deere would use green and yellow colors.

As of June, 2006, at the forestry fair "Florence Wood", the Timberjack product line was discontinued, and John Deere, its parent company, became the largest single brand of forestry equipment. Its global market share for both cut-to-length and full tree equipment was very strong shortly after the acquisition.
