= Cut-to-length logging =

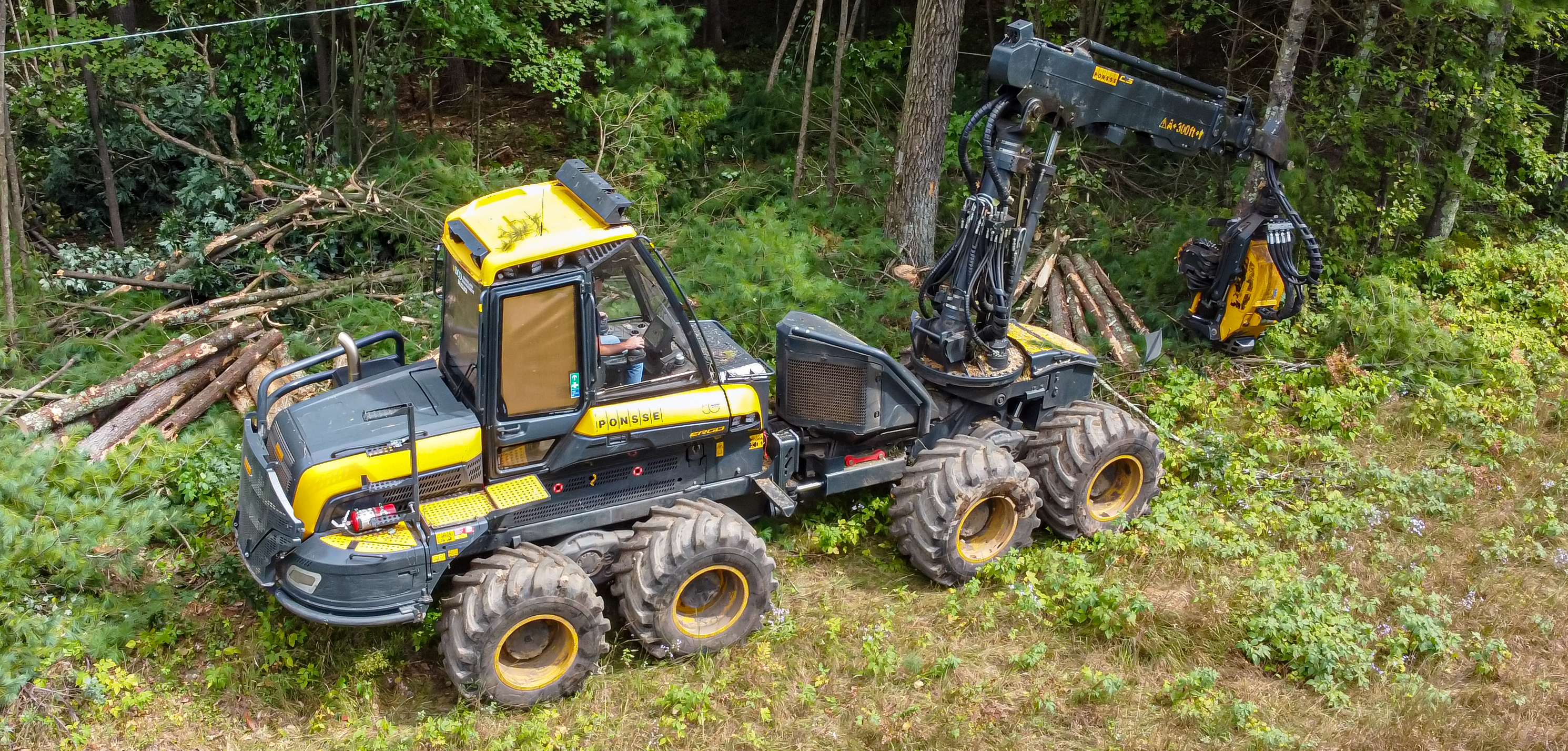
Tree harvester doing cut-to-length logging (Click for video)

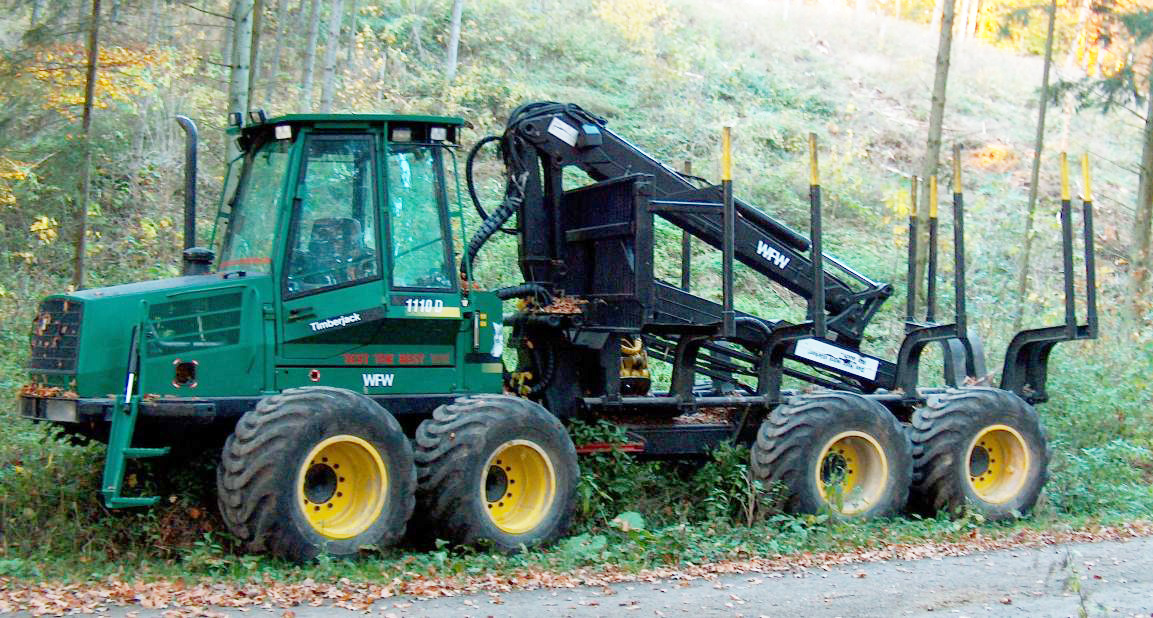
Forwarder

Cut-to-length logging (CTL) is a mechanized harvesting system in which trees are delimbed and cut to length directly at the stump. CTL is typically a two-man, two-machine operation with a harvester felling, delimbing, and bucking trees and a forwarder transporting the logs from the felling to a landing area close to a road accessible by trucks.

CTL is the primary logging method in European countries, while full-tree logging and the even older technique of tree-length logging are more popular in North America and less developed countries, where tree sizes can exceed the capacity of the harvester's felling head, i.e., tree stems with a butt diameter of over 90 centimeters. CTL lends itself to timber harvesting in plantation forestry where stems are often harvested before they reach large dimensions.

== Advantages compared to full-tree logging ==
- Cleaner wood since the logs are not skidded on the ground to the landing (in tree length more than full tree)
- More fresh wood (in tree length more than full tree)
- Less damage to retained trees in thinning operations
- Typically requires fewer types of machines in an operation
- No need to clear large landings close to the road
- Greater personnel safety due to enclosed/protected machine cabs
- More environmentally friendly due to:
  - less soil disturbance than in skidding operations (if improper skidding practices take place)
  - no slash dumped at the landing
  - higher retention of foliar nutrients within the harvested area

== Disadvantages compared to full-tree logging ==
- Somewhat higher capital cost per volume when used in large scale clear cuts
- Use of more advanced technology requires more operator knowledge and training

== Cost ==
The capital costs for a typical CTL operation, with one harvester and one forwarder, are quite high. The price of a pair of machines alone are approx. US$1,000,000.

== See also ==
- Logging truck
