= Matakohe =

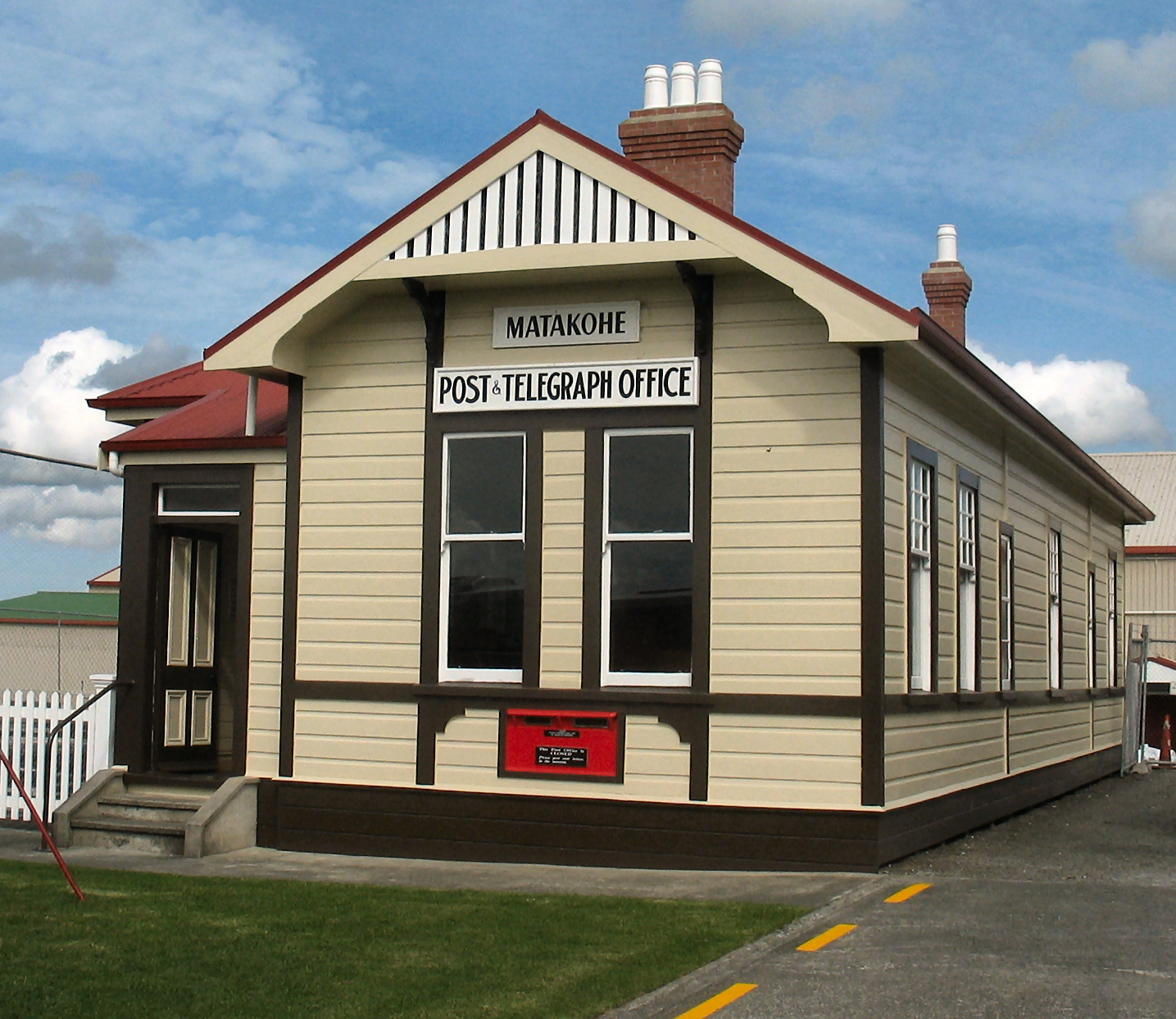
- Post and telegraph office, now a museum
- Interactive map of Matakohe
- Coordinates: 36°7′46″S 174°11′6″E
- Country: New Zealand
- Region: Northland Region
- District: Kaipara District
- Ward: Otamatea Ward
- Electorates: Northland; Te Tai Tokerau

Government
  - Territorial Authority: Kaipara District Council
  - Regional council: Northland Regional Council
  - Mayor of Kaipara: Jonathan Larsen
  - Northland MP: Grant McCallum
  - Te Tai Tokerau MP: Mariameno Kapa-Kingi

Area
  - Total: 14.92 km^{2} (5.76 sq mi)

Population (2023 Census)
  - Total: 156
  - Density: 10.5/km^{2} (27.1/sq mi)

Matakohe is a settlement in Northland, New Zealand. The Matakohe River is a short river which runs from the north into the Arapaoa River, which is part of the Kaipara Harbour. State Highway 12 passes through Matakohe. Ruawai is 16 km to the west, and Paparoa is 6 km north east. The Hukatere Peninsula extends south into the Kaipara Harbour.

The Kauri Museum at Matakohe shows the area's heritage in the kauri timber industry.

== History ==
=== European settlement ===
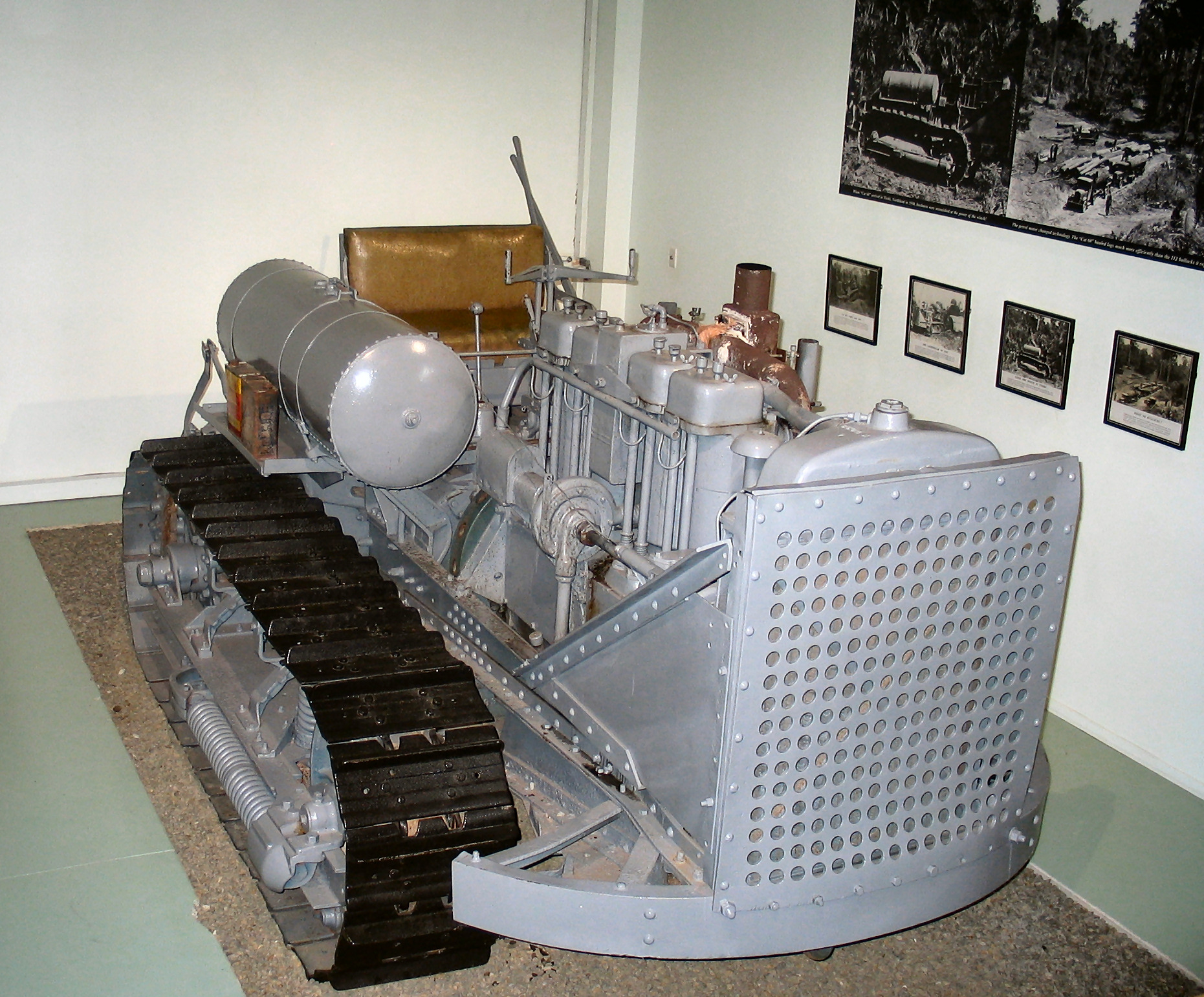
This 60 horsepower machine is one of five imported into New Zealand in 1930 for hauling logs. It replaced eight bullock teams (112 animals). Presently in the Kauri Museum in Matakohe

The Matakohe block was first settled by Pākehā in 1863, when members of the Albertland religious group arrived in New Zealand. The land was initially burnt off to allow for the planting of crops and grass. A weekly (initially monthly) ferry service brought mail, and a road was constructed to Paparoa. In 1881, the longest wharf in the Kaipara—1,450 feet (440 m) long—was built at Matakohe to accommodate the steamers. Minnie Casey served Matakohe in the 1880s, and the S.S. Ethel, then the S.S. Tangihua in the 1890s.

The kauri gum industry became established around Matakohe in 1867–70, possibly the first place in the Kaipara District that the industry developed amongst settlers. A flax mill was built in 1870, but it was not profitable and was soon converted to a timber mill. This was replaced by a larger timber mill in the 1880s. The mill was destroyed by fire in 1906. Matakohe held a race-day each February, in which were entries from as far as Kaiwaka and Waipu.

In the 1890s, the population of Matakohe increased from 93 to 231, and the town was described as "the principal place in the Otamatea County". By 1902 the town had two boarding houses, a library, stores and a goods shed, as well as the older church and school. The population reached 264 in 1906, but declined to 141 in 1921.

=== 20th century ===
The town's focus shifted from gum digging to dairy farming in the early 20th century. Apple growing was also successful at first, but ceased by 1935 due to the Great Depression and poor management. The roads improved, and by 1920 all 53 miles (85 km) of roads in the area were metalled, using the abundant local supplies of limestone. The route to Dargaville was improved by the opening of a road through Ruawai in 1927, replacing the inland road.

=== Marae ===
Matakohe has two marae. Te Kōwhai Marae are affiliated with Ngāti Whātua and Te Uri o Hau. Matatina Marae and Tuohu meeting house are a traditional meeting place of Te Roroa.

== Demographics ==
Matakohe is in an SA1 statistical area which covers 14.92 km^{2} (5.76 sq mi). The SA1 area is part of the larger Rūāwai-Matakohe statistical area.

Historical population
| Year | Pop. | ±% p.a. |
|---|---|---|
| 2006 | 120 | — |
| 2013 | 141 | +2.33% |
| 2018 | 120 | −3.17% |
| 2023 | 156 | +5.39% |

Matakohe had a population of 156 in the 2023 New Zealand census, an increase of 36 people (30.0%) since the 2018 census, and an increase of 15 people (10.6%) since the 2013 census. There were 78 males and 78 females in 69 dwellings. 1.9% of people identified as LGBTIQ+. The median age was 53.4 years (compared with 38.1 years nationally). There were 30 people (19.2%) aged under 15 years, 12 (7.7%) aged 15 to 29, 69 (44.2%) aged 30 to 64, and 45 (28.8%) aged 65 or older.

People could identify as more than one ethnicity. The results were 94.2% European (Pākehā); 13.5% Māori; and 1.9% Middle Eastern, Latin American and African New Zealanders (MELAA). English was spoken by 98.1%, Māori language by 5.8%, and other languages by 7.7%. No language could be spoken by 1.9% (e.g. too young to talk). The percentage of people born overseas was 13.5, compared with 28.8% nationally.

Religious affiliations were 25.0% Christian, 3.8% Māori religious beliefs, and 1.9% Buddhist. People who answered that they had no religion were 53.8%, and 15.4% of people did not answer the census question.

Of those at least 15 years old, 12 (9.5%) people had a bachelor's or higher degree, 75 (59.5%) had a post-high school certificate or diploma, and 33 (26.2%) people exclusively held high school qualifications. The median income was $27,900, compared with $41,500 nationally. 3 people (2.4%) earned over $100,000 compared to 12.1% nationally. The employment status of those at least 15 was that 51 (40.5%) people were employed full-time and 21 (16.7%) were part-time.

== Education ==
Matakohe School is a coeducational full primary (years 1–8) school with a roll of 35 students as of July 2026. The school celebrated its 125th reunion in 2003. When it was founded, the school shared a half day with Omaru School. Over the years, it has amalgamated with Ararua, Hukatere, Oparakau and Parahi schools.

There was a Matakohe School established in 1870. It used a church ante-room at first, then moved to the main church building while the school building was being constructed.

== Notable people ==
- Gordon Coates, Prime Minister 1925–28, born on the Hukatere Peninsula at Ruatuna, and attended Matakohe School.
