= Sulky =

Lightweight cart used for harness races

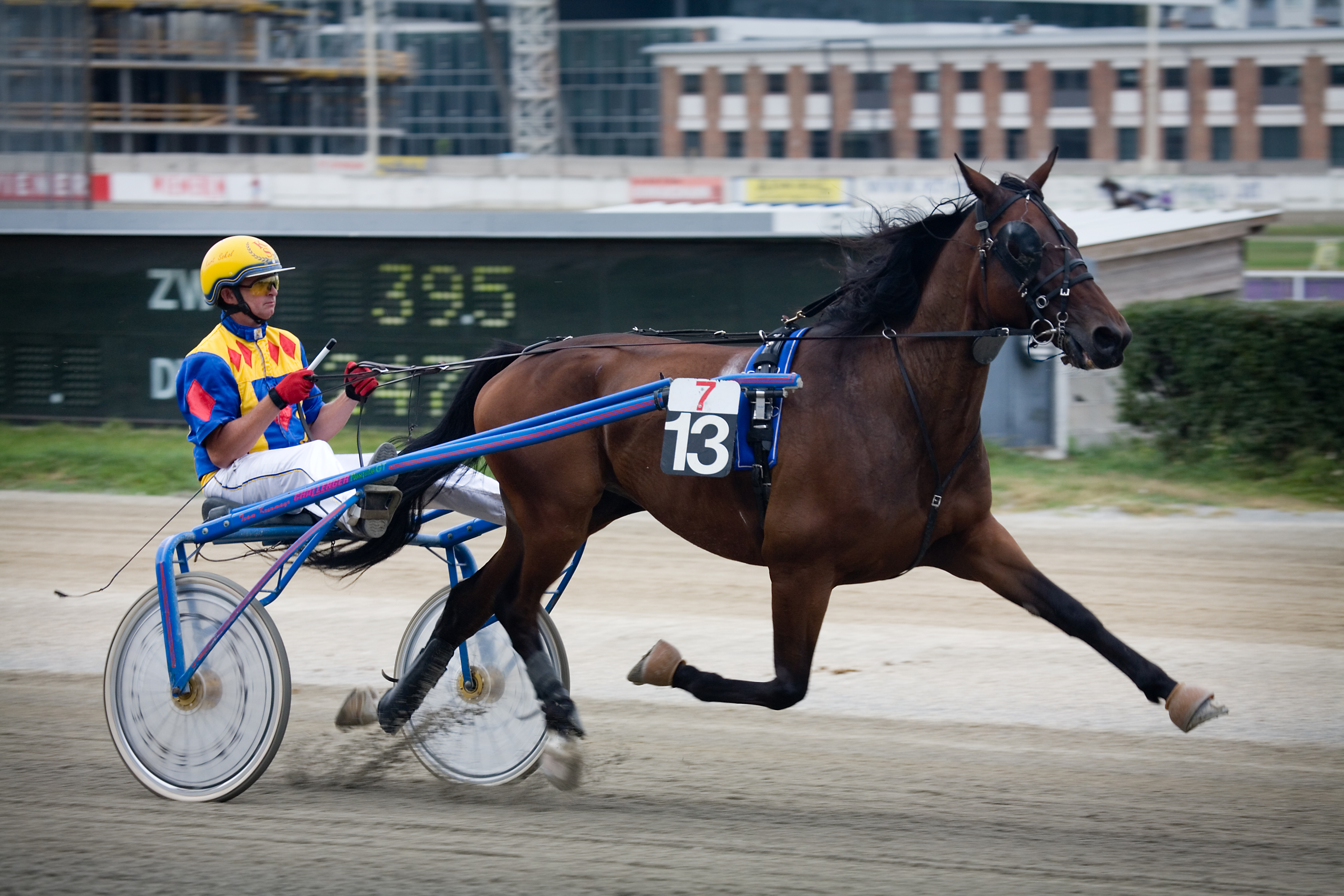
Harness racing sulky (2007)

A sulky is a light two-wheeled horse-drawn vehicle with a seat for a single driver. The term is best known from harness racing, where it describes the sleek tubular-framed vehicle, often called a "bike", that a horse pulls around the racetrack. The word is suggestive of a driver sitting alone.

Outside of harness racing, the term is also applied to: a light cart used in roadster classes at horse shows, a single metal seat on horse-drawn farm implements such as plows and mowers, and a wheeled device for hauling logs in forestry.

== Design ==
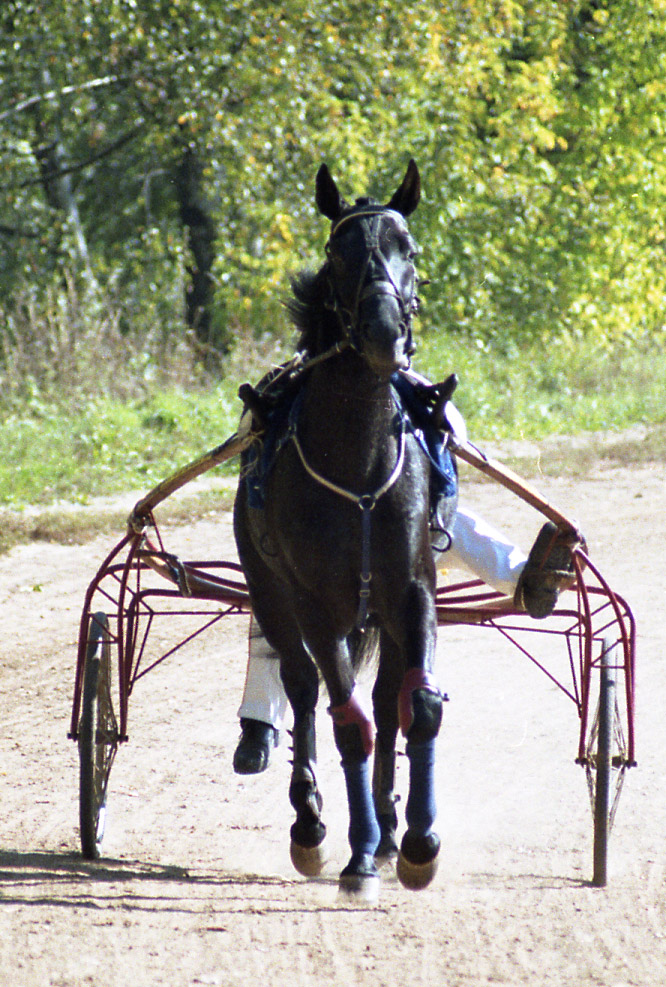
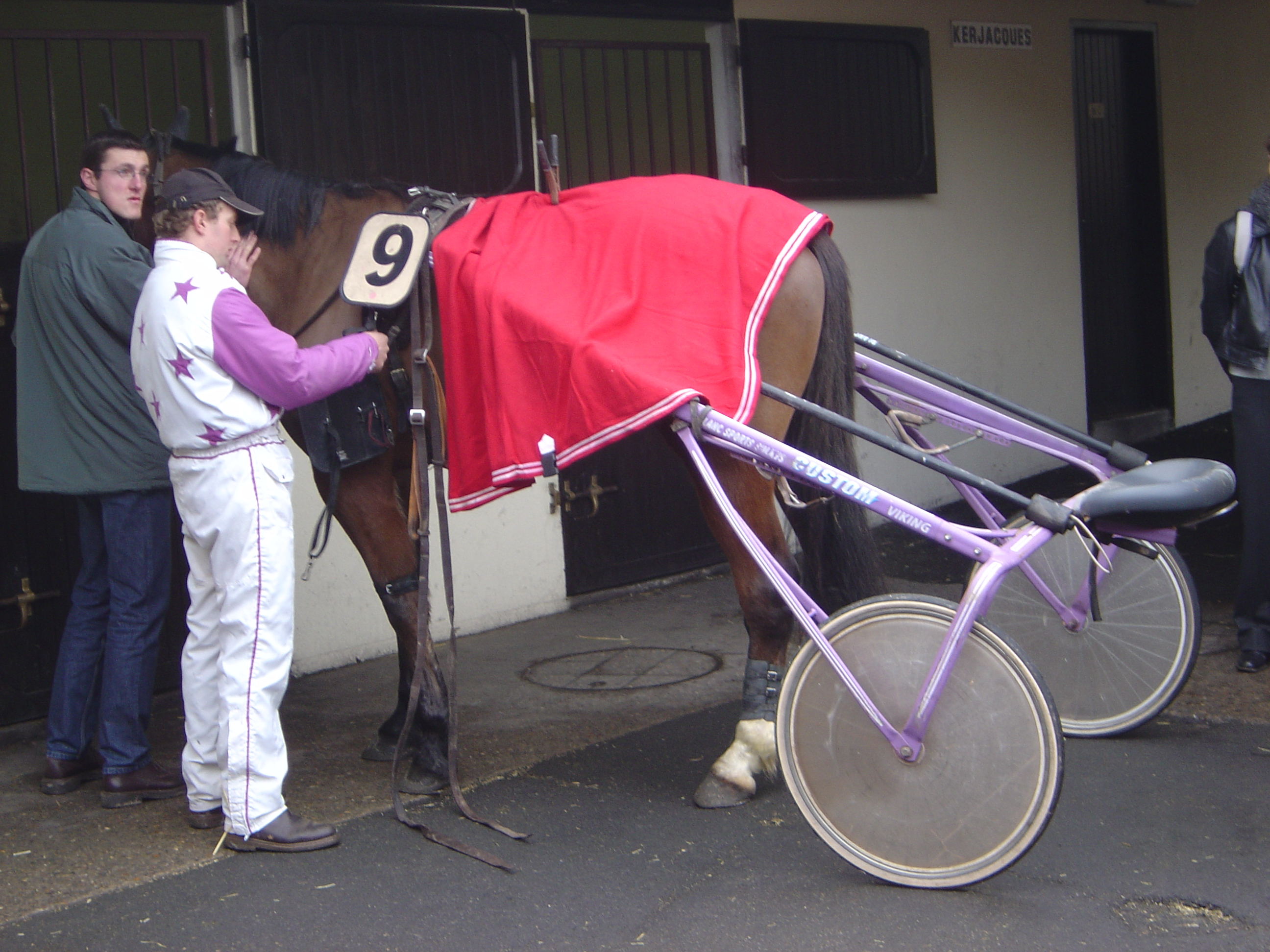
Modern racing sulkies

Sulkies built for harness racing are made as light and low as possible, with two wheels, a small seat set close to the horse's hindquarters, and the driver's feet braced in stirrups. Early frames were constructed of wood and later of tubular steel. Modern racing sulkies are constructed of lighter materials including aluminum, titanium or carbon fiber. The shafts may sweep back around the seat in a continuous bow and form much of the frame, or the sulky may be constructed in an angular way. The wheels are light, wire-spoked "bike" wheels with pneumatic tires, which give the vehicle its common name, the "bike".

A road sulky

Sulkies for training and exercise (called "road sulkies", "jog carts", or "speed carts") follow the same basic layout but are heavier and more robustly built, with larger, more comfortable seats and longer shafts. Most modern training sulkies include suspension in the seat or frame, fenders, and aprons (fabric shields in the front to catch mud and dirt from the horse's hooves). Some may have seats large enough for two people.

Some racing rules may require that fenders (called mud guards) be fitted for racing on wet or muddy tracks.

== Historical context ==
Historically, sulkies were built for trotting matches and made from wood with very tall wheels and almost no body, just a simple frame supporting a single seat. Such vehicles were called "sulkies" because they were "said to have been chosen by unsociable people fond of their own company or fits of sulking".

Early racing sulkies were constructed with tall wooden wheels, often 5 feet in diameter. The smaller 30-inch bicycle-spoked wheels were introduced in 1892, and later the seat height was lowered behind the horse to become more aerodynamic.

Evolution of sulkies

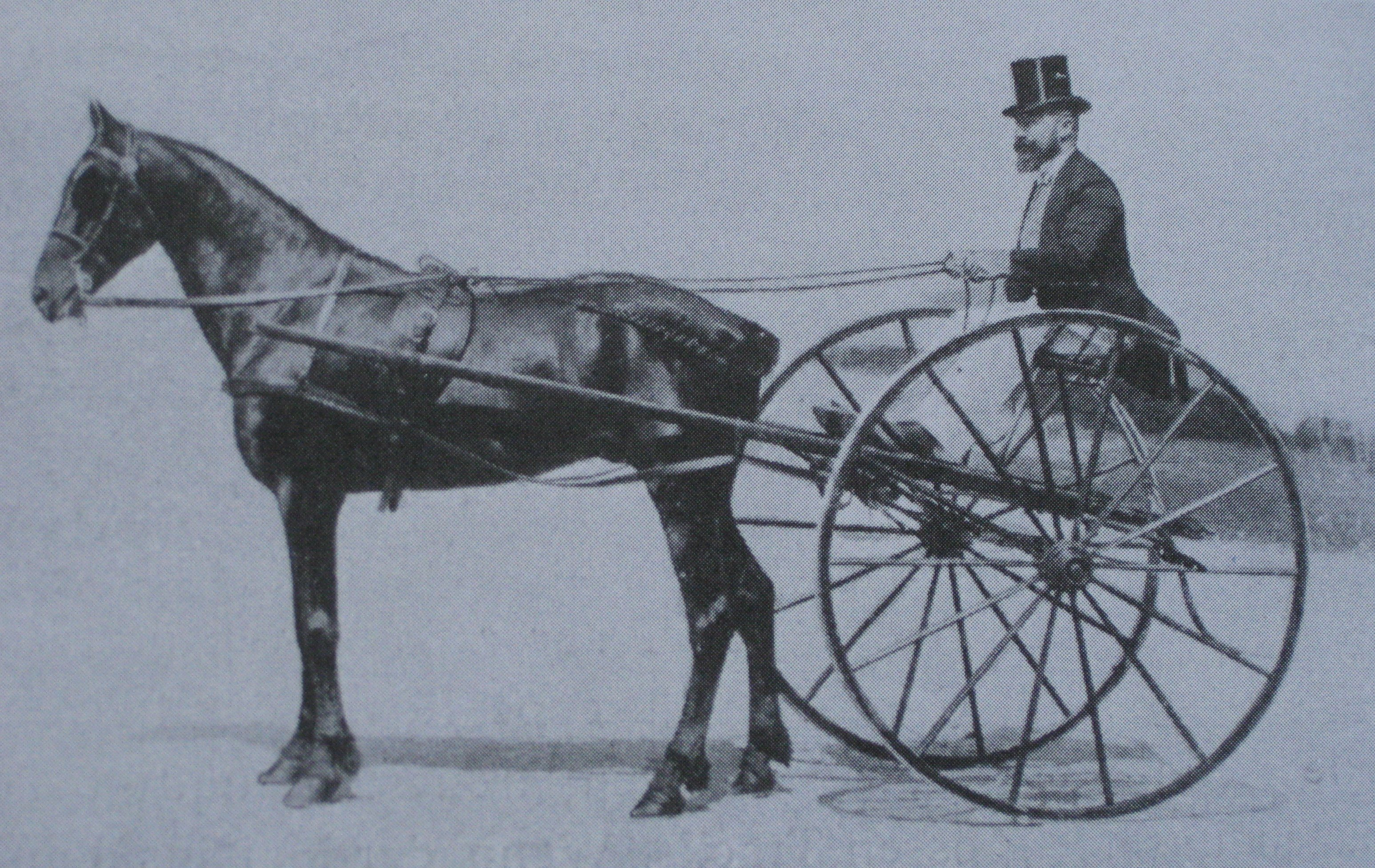
1873

1894

1909

2023

== Variants ==
In places where harness racing occurs on snow, a sulky may be constructed with runners.

A horse show vehicle used in roadster classes is also called a sulky. The drivers dress in racing silks and show their horses at a fast trot around the showring.

A sulky seat is a single-person metal seat found on many horse-drawn agricultural implements such as plows, mowers and rakes.

A logging sulky is used to transport logs assisted by wheels. Smaller ones are constructed similar to a hand truck and are towed manually. Larger ones are constructed similar to a logging arch and may be towed by animals or tractors.

Variants of 'sulky'

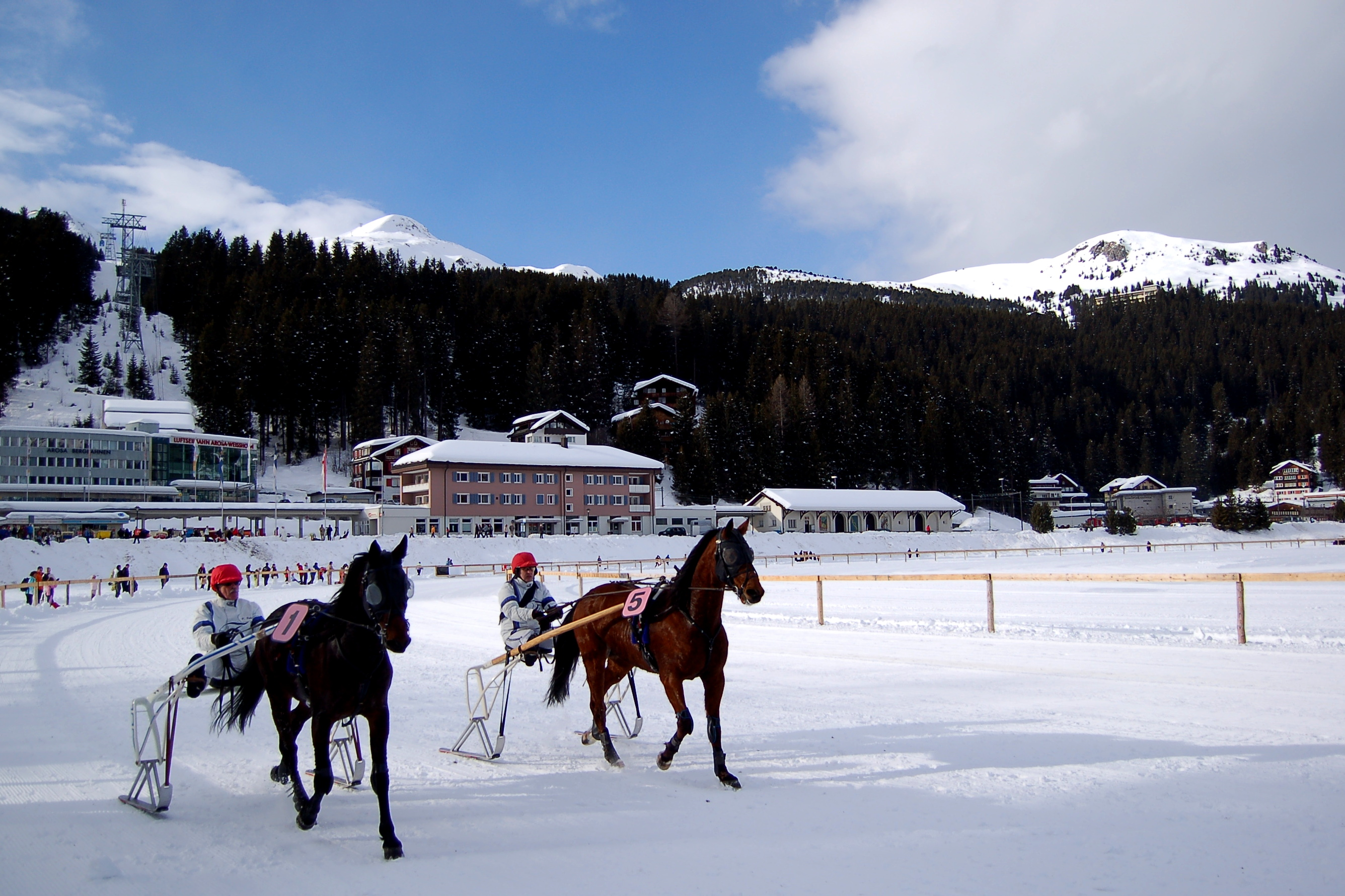
A sulky on snow runners

Horse show sulky for roadster classes

Agricultural sulky seat

Sulky seat on a mower

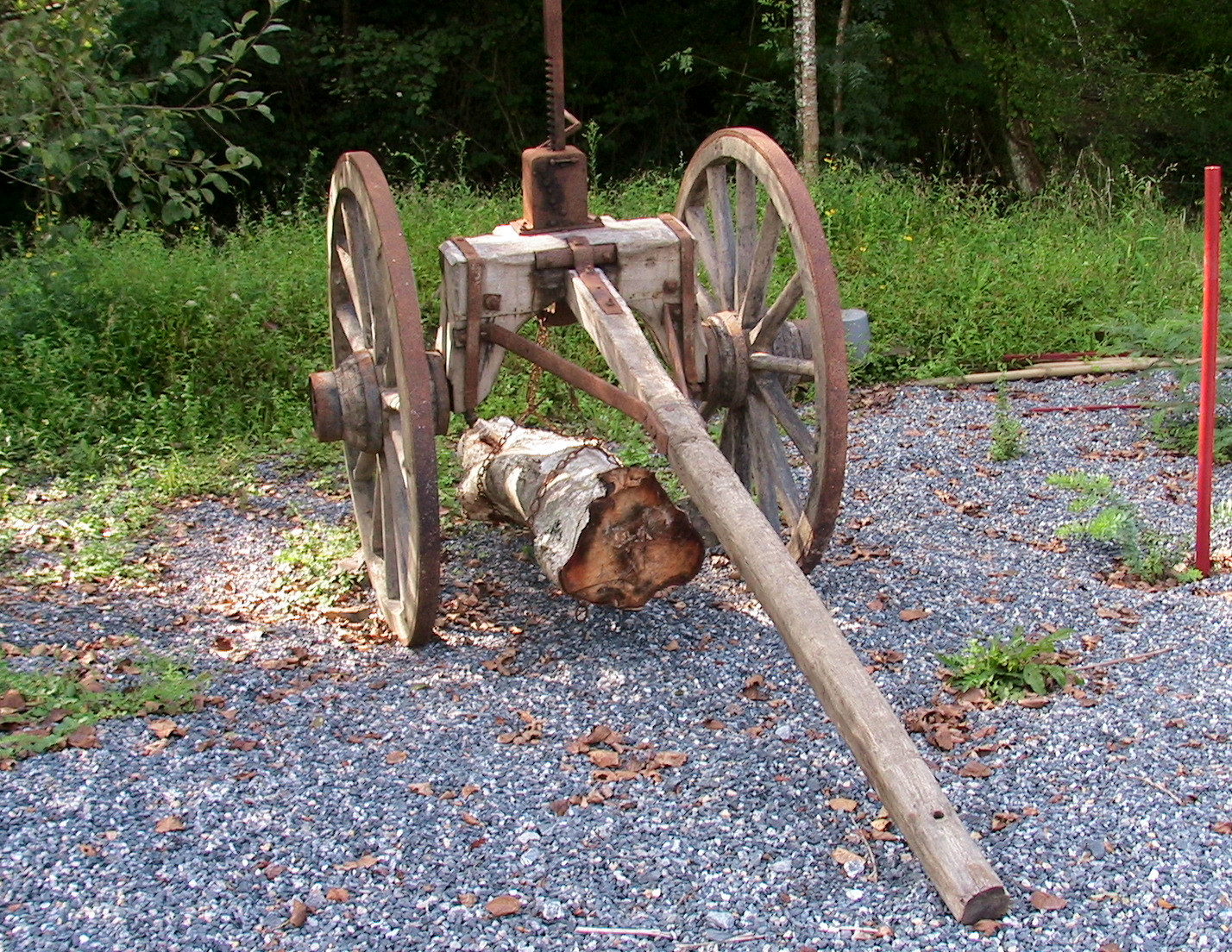
A logging arch, a type of logging sulky

== Illegal sulky racing controversy in Ireland ==
The use of sulkies on public roads has been a considerable source of concern in Ireland where road accidents involving the irresponsible use of sulkies is relatively common. Mostly associated with Irish Travellers, accidents involving sulkies performing illegal "sulky racing" on public roads have caused injuries and deaths to motorists, and horses, as well as damage to vehicles. In February 2026, more than 10,000 members of the public signed a petition calling for a ban on sulky racing.

== See also ==
- Horse-drawn vehicle
