= Matakohe Post Office =

Coordinates: 36.1301°S 174.1857°E

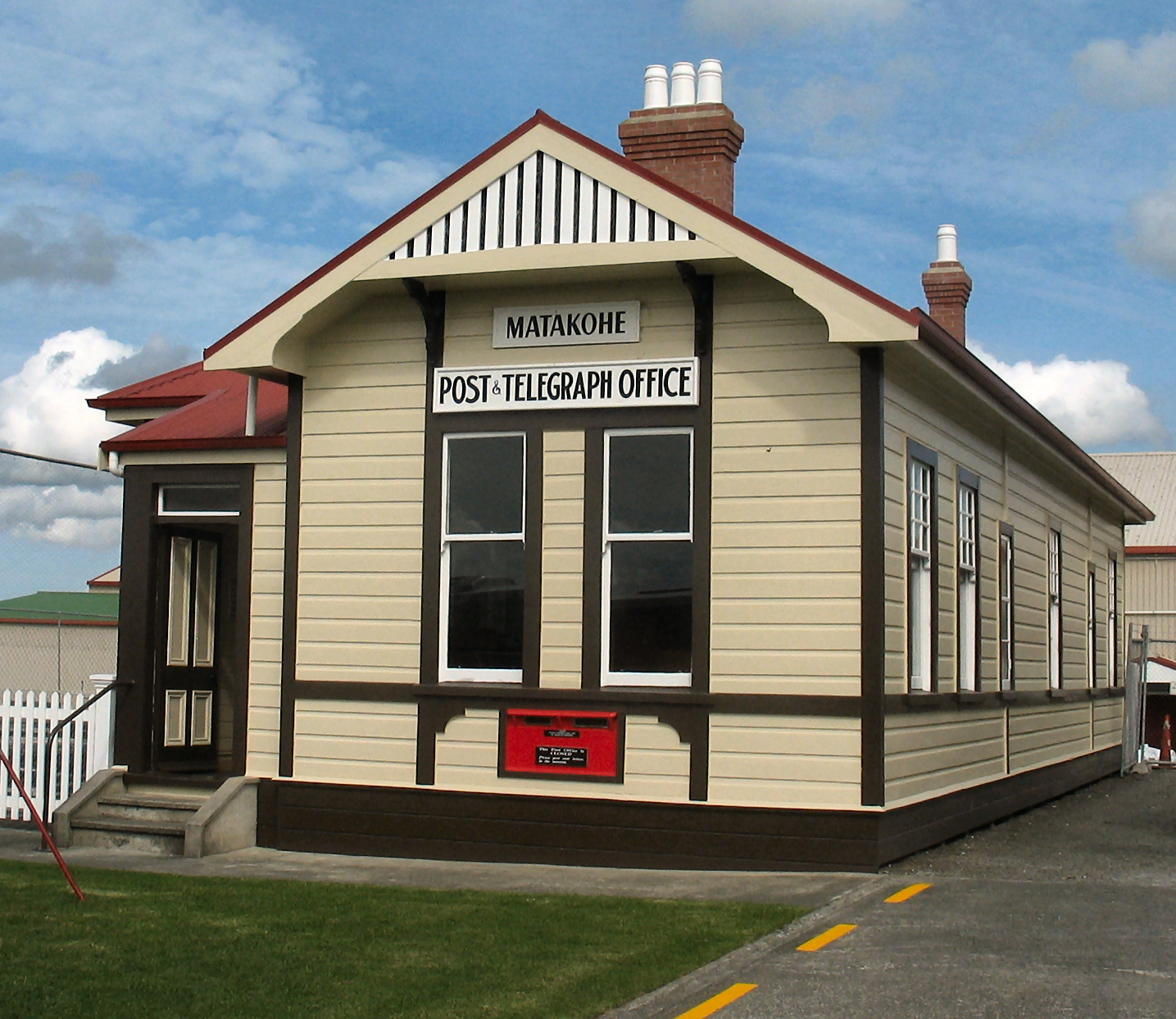
Matakohe Post and telegraph office

The former Matakohe Post and Telegraph Office was opened in 1909 and remained in use until its closure in 1988. The building was purchased in 1989 by the Kauri Museum then moved from its original location and resited to its current one next to the main museum complex on Church Street, Matakohe. and renovated to hold a collection of postal and communication related objects and images. The building was listed as a Category 2 Historic Place List No: 3911 with Heritage New Zealand in September 1984.

== History ==
In 1907, the need for a post office was raised by the residents of Matakohe to Member of Parliament for Kaipara, John Stallworthy, who made representation to the Postmaster-General on their behalf. In July of the same year, Stallworthy received a reply stating if the settlers were willing to provide a suitable site of 'not less than 40 ft frontage, and 80 ft depth' then provision of a post office could be considered. By November 1907 initial funding of £600 for the future Matakohe Post and Telegraph Office was included in the Public Works Estimates votes for public institutions and buildings. Tenders were called for in March 1908 and finalised in May with the firm of Radcliffe and Burton awarded the contract at a tender price of £749. Construction began in June its completion date is undetermined by 1909, however the post office was providing services. Based on a description of the finalised plans published in the Auckland Star in March 1908 the architectural style was a residential villa type of timber construction. The front elevation was reached through a porch leading to the public space, 10 ft x 9 ft (3.048m x 2.74m). A large counter separated the 15 ft wide by 21 ft long (4.57m x 6.4m) mailroom complete with a fireplace from the public. It also included a manual telephone exchange, public telephone area, as well as a number of rooms to accommodate a kitchen, bathroom and outbuildings.

Changes in government policy during the 1980s had corporatised the postal and telecommunication services, in 1988 432 post offices were closed the Matakohe branch among them. The building was purchased by the Kauri Museum in 1989 and removed from its original site. It was resited and renovated to house a display of postal and communications related objects, and historic images. Replicas of former postal workers were also put in situ as part of the overall post office exhibit.
