= Skidder =

Type of heavy vehicle used in logging operations to pull cut trees out of a forest

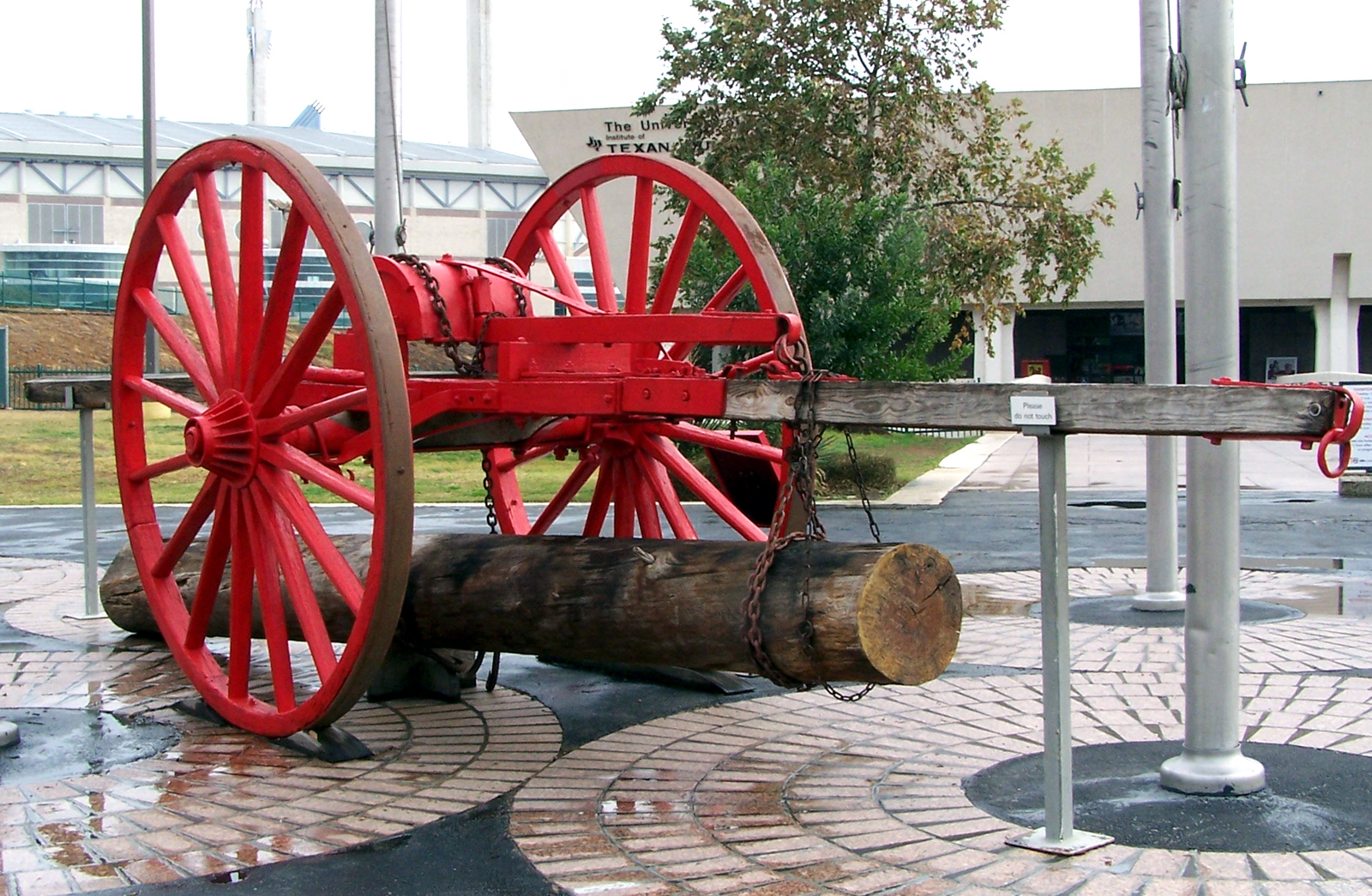
A slip tongue log skidder used in the 19th and early 20th centuries

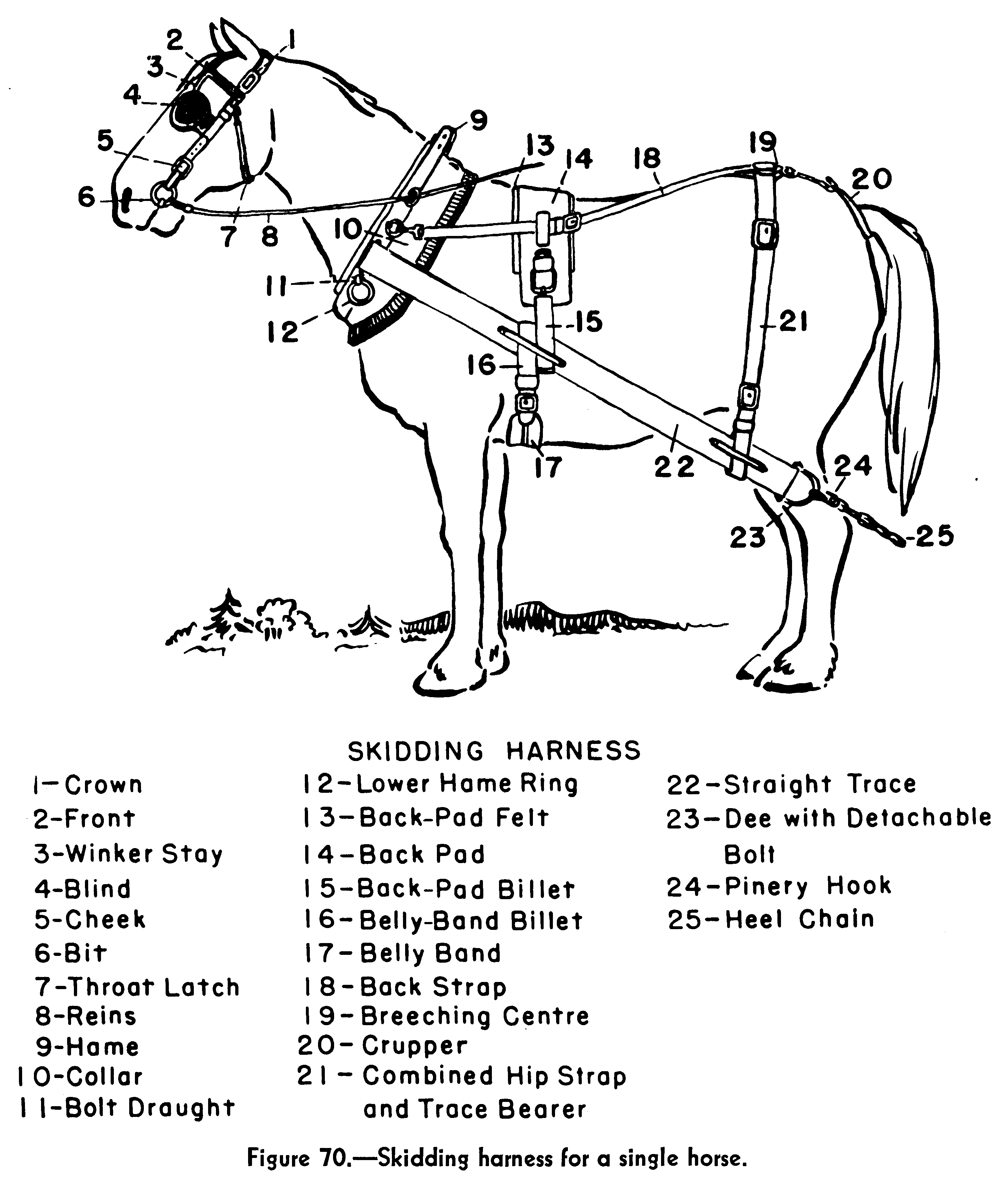
Elements of a skidding harness

A skidder is any type of heavy vehicle used in a logging operation for pulling cut trees out of a forest in a process called "skidding", in which the logs are transported from the cutting site to a landing. There they are loaded onto trucks (or railroad cars or a flume), and sent to the mill. One exception is that in the early days of logging, when distances from the timberline to the mill were shorter, the landing stage was omitted altogether, and the "skidder" would have been used as the main road vehicle, in place of the trucks, railroad, or flume. Modern forms of skidders can pull trees with a cable and winch (cable skidder), just like the old steam donkeys, or with a hydraulic grapple either on boom (grapple skidder) or on the back of the frame (clambunk skidder).

== History ==
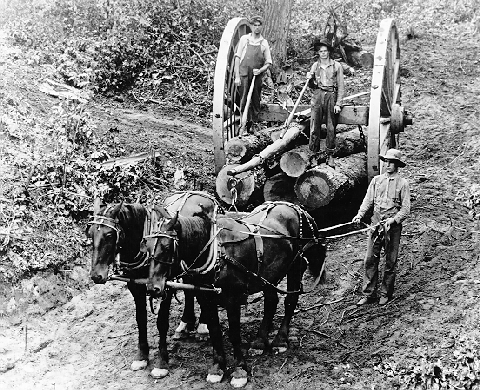
Horse skidder with high wheels

Early skidders were pulled by a team of oxen, horses or mules. The driver would straddle the cart over felled logs, where dangling tongs would be positioned to raise the end of the log off the ground. The team pulled the tongue forward, allowing the log to "skid" along between the rolling wheels. These were known as "slip-tongue wheels" Starting in the early 1920s, animals were gradually replaced by gasoline-powered crawlers, although some small operations continue to use horses. In other places, steel "arches" were used behind the crawlers. Similar in function to the slip-tongue wheels, arches were used to reduce friction by raising up one end of the load, which was dangled from a cable which in turn ran down the back of the arch, and was raised or lowered by the crawler's winch. Another piece similar to the arch was the "bummer", which was simply a small trailer to be towed behind a crawler, on top of which one end of the log load would rest.

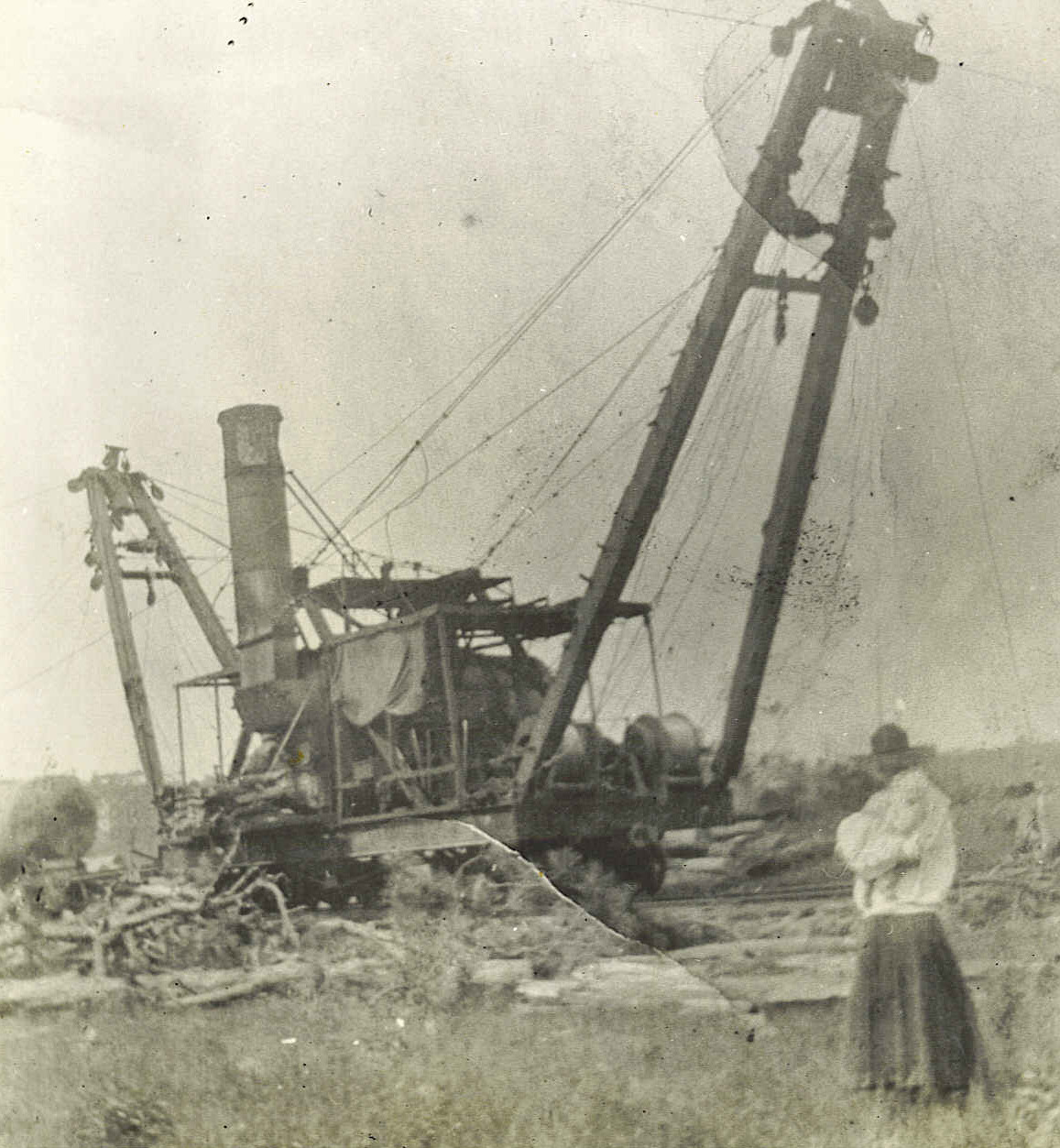
Clyde Skidder at Marathon Logging Camp ~1921

The early mechanical skidders were steam powered. They traveled on railroads, known as "dummylines" and the felled trees were dragged or "skidded" to the railroad where they were later loaded onto rail cars. Some, such as the steam donkeys, were relatively simple but other mechanical skidders were more complex. The largest of these mechanical skidders was the Lidgerwood skidder, which not only brought logs to the landing from the cutting site, but loaded them onto railroad cars as well, making it both a skidder and loader. One popular brand was the Clyde Skidder, built by Clyde Ironworks in Duluth, Minnesota. The Clyde was capable of retrieving logs from four different points at the same time. Each cable, or lead, was approximately 1,000 feet (300 m) in length. Once the logs were attached and a clearance signal was sent for retrieval, they could be skidded at a speed of 1,000 feet per minute (18 km/h). In New Zealand cables were run five miles. Working conditions around these machines were very dangerous.

== Modern equivalents ==
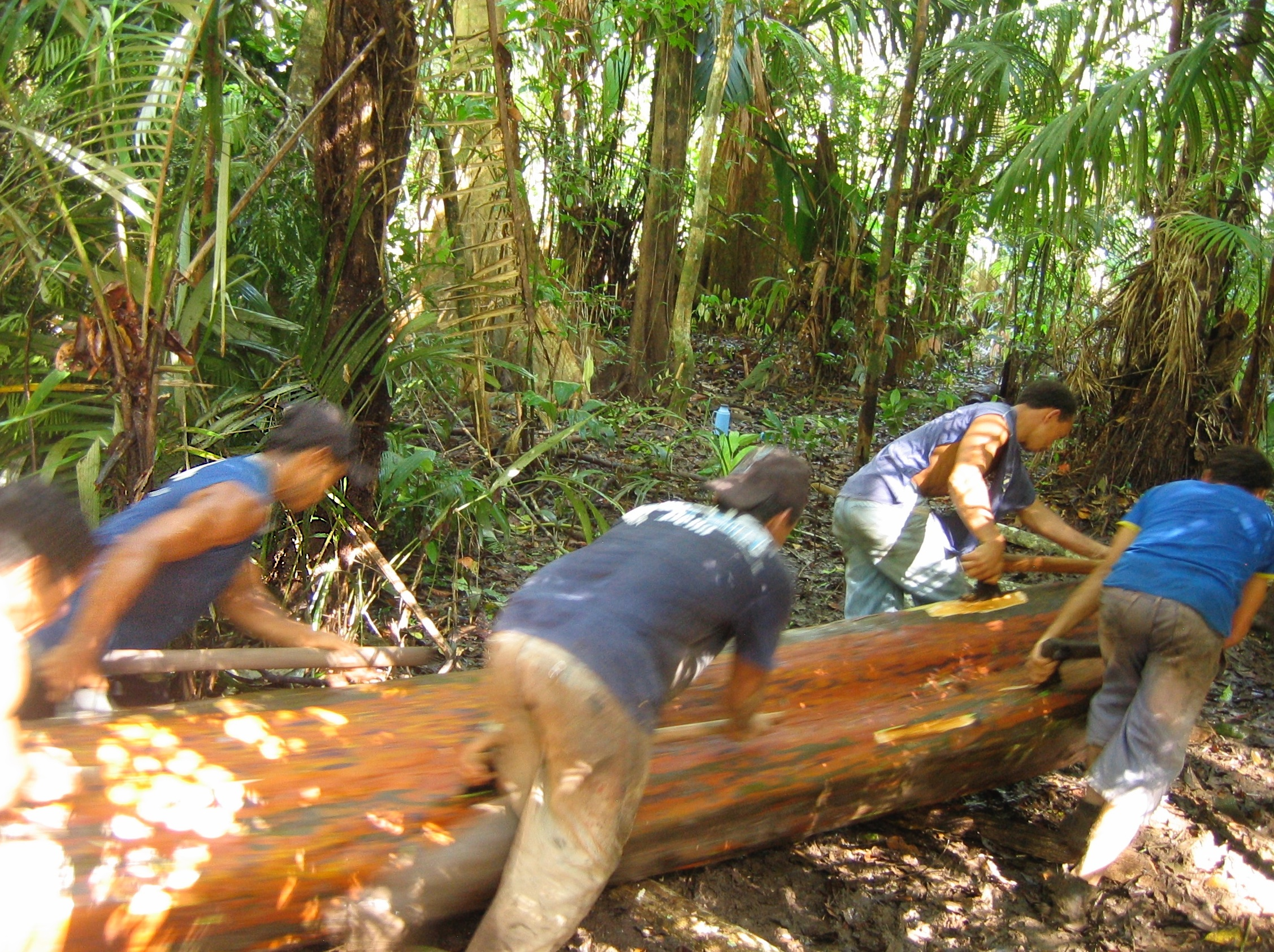
Manual skidding in Brazil, 2008

Contemporary skidders are tracked or four wheel drive tractors with a diesel engine, winch and steel, funnel-shaped guards on the rear to protect their wheels. They have articulated steering and usually a small, adjustable, push-blade on the front. The operator/logger is protected from falling or flying debris (or parted cables, or rolling over) by a steel enclosure. They are one of the few logging machines that is capable of thinning or selective logging in larger timber. Forwarders can haul small short pieces out, however a skidder is one of the few options for taking out some trees while leaving others when thinning mature lumber.

The skidder can also be used for pulling tree stumps, pushing over small trees, and preliminary grading of a logging path known as a "skid road".

While wood is being yarded (pulled) by the skidder, tree particles and seeds are cultivated into the soil.

Skidder logging can be disadvantageous in thinning operations due to the damage caused to remaining trees as branches and trunks are dragged against them, tearing away the protective bark of living trees. Another ecological concern is the deep furrows in the topsoil sometimes made by skidders, especially when using tires with chains, which alter surface runoff patterns and increases the costs of forest rehabilitation and reforestation.

=== Versions ===
==== Logging arch ====
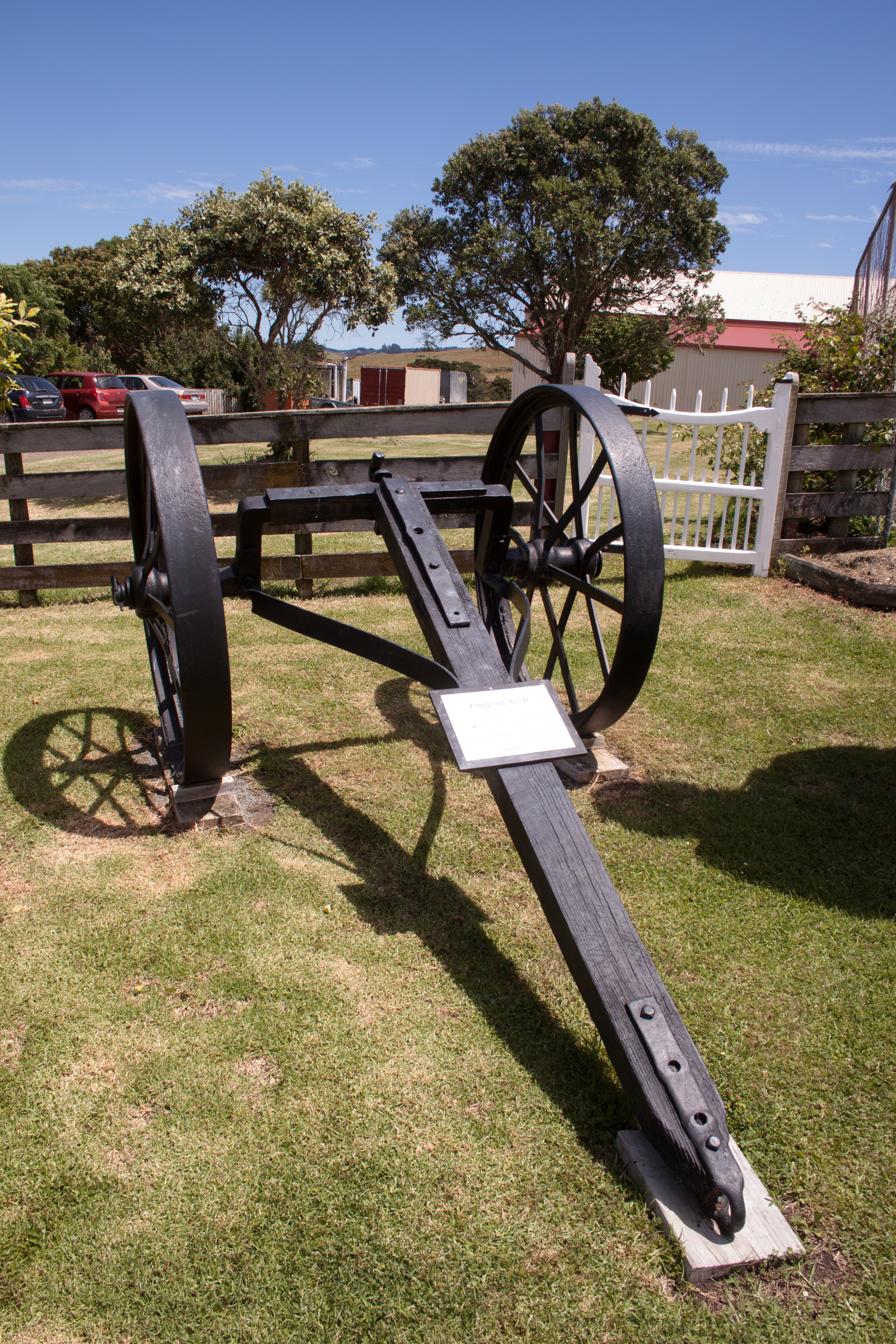
Logging arch on display at Kauri Museum in New Zealand

A device similar to a skip tongue log skidder except that it is made of steel, including the spoked wheels

==== Cable skidders ====
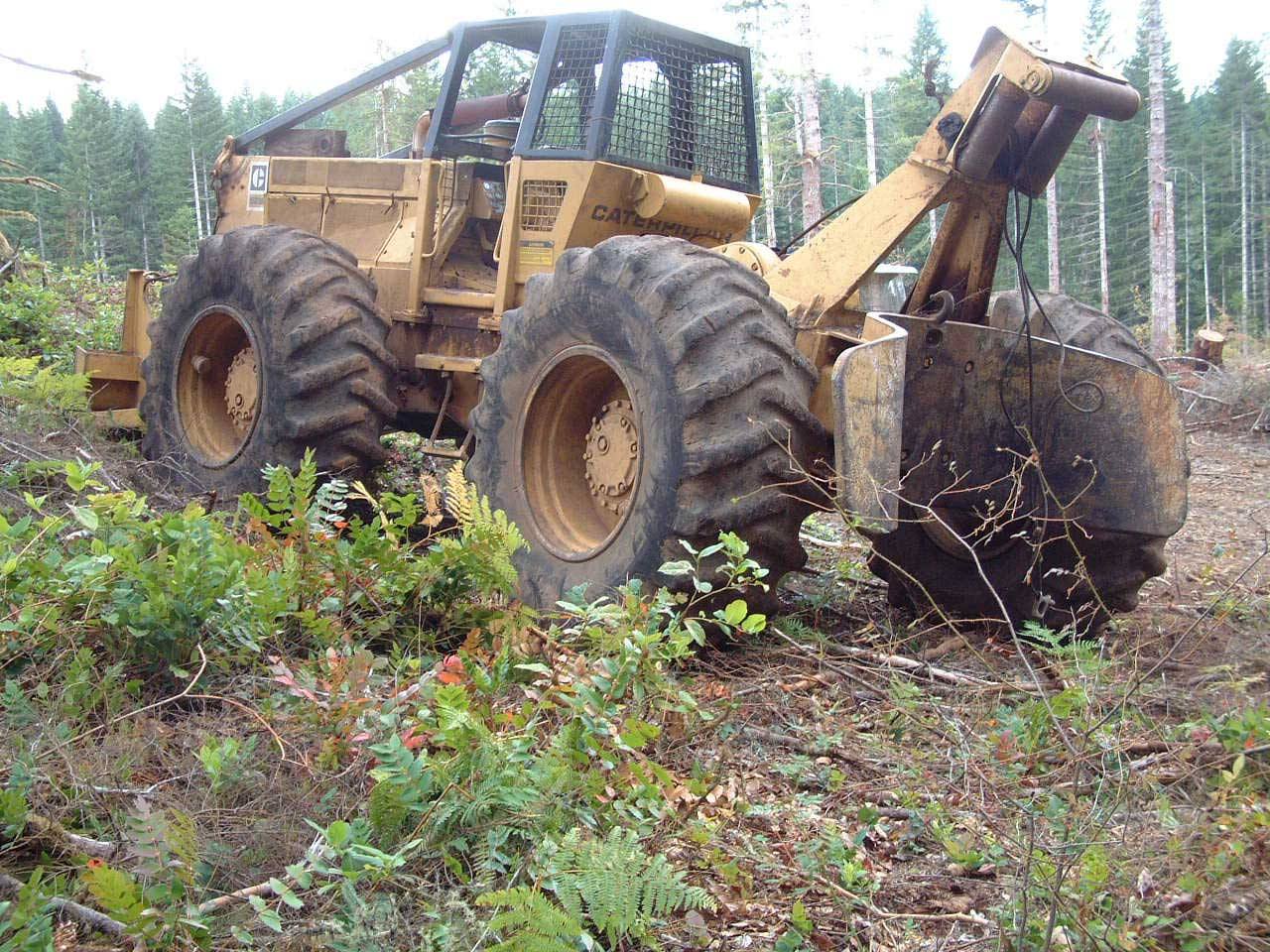
Caterpillar 528 cable skidder in Apiary, Oregon

On a cable skidder, the cable is reeled out and attached to a pull of cut timber, then the winch pulls the load toward the skidder. The winch or grapple holds the trees while the skidder drags them to a landing area. Cable skidders are more labor-intensive than grapple skidders because someone (the operator or a second person) must drag the winch line out to the logs and hook them up manually. Nowadays, cable skidders are less popular than in the past. These machines are most useful in areas where it is not possible to drive the machine close to the log (such as in steep hills).

==== Grapple skidders ====
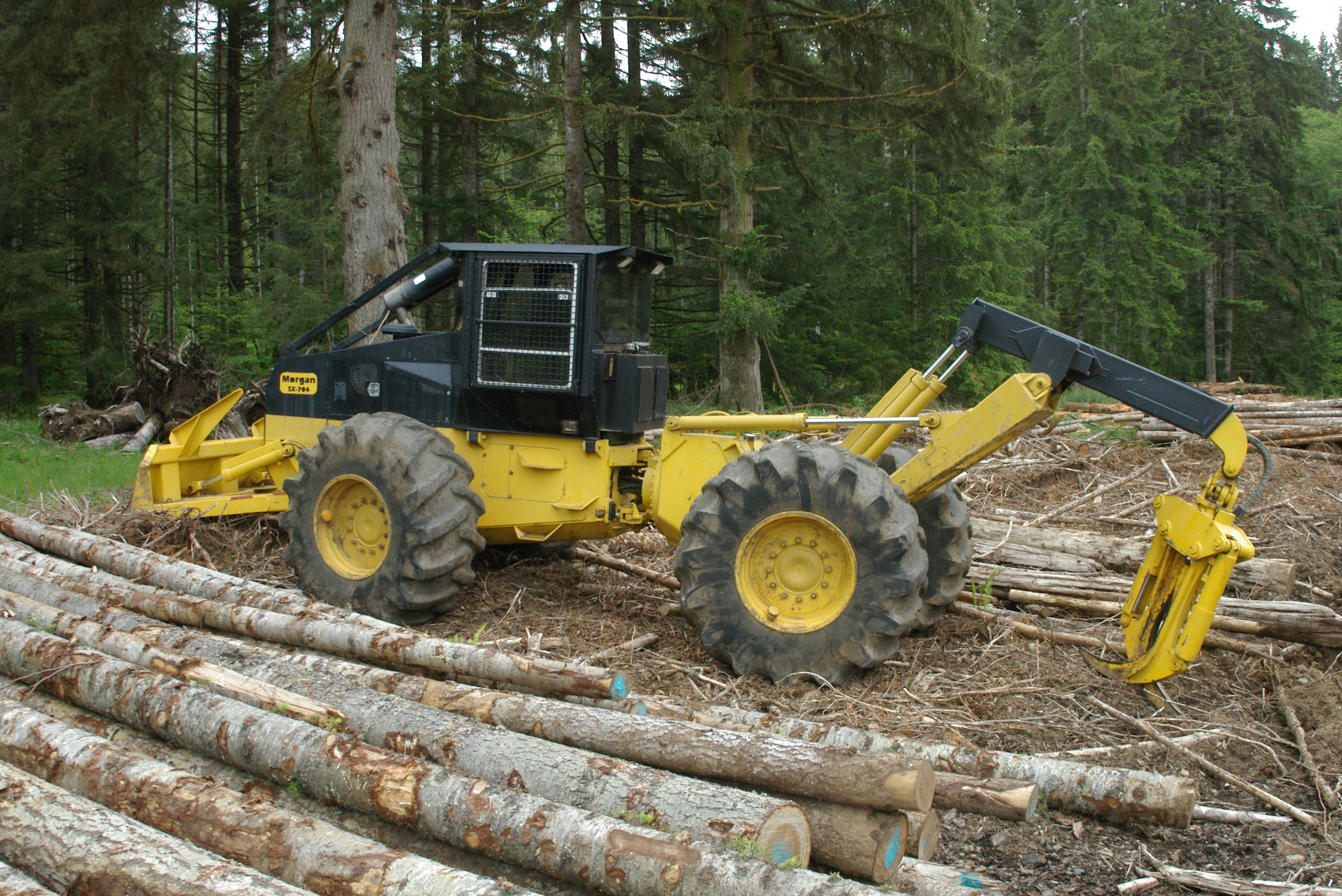
Modern dual function grapple skidder

Grapple skidders use a loader crane boom with a hydraulic grapple bucket to grab and lift the timber.

There are three types of 'fixed boom' grapple skidders. A single-function boom type has two hydraulic cylinders, only allowing the boom to lower in one position. Dual-function booms (as pictured) have four cylinders, which allows for adjusting the boom in two different places. The third type permits the grapple boom to be swung from side to side, allowing spread out trees to be grabbed at once.

In some areas, loggers have combined a hydraulic claw on the side with the blade of their grapple skidders, making it possible to pile logs in some cases. More common on cable skidders, this also permits hauling back bark and tops when returning from a landing area to fallen timber.

Clambunk skidders

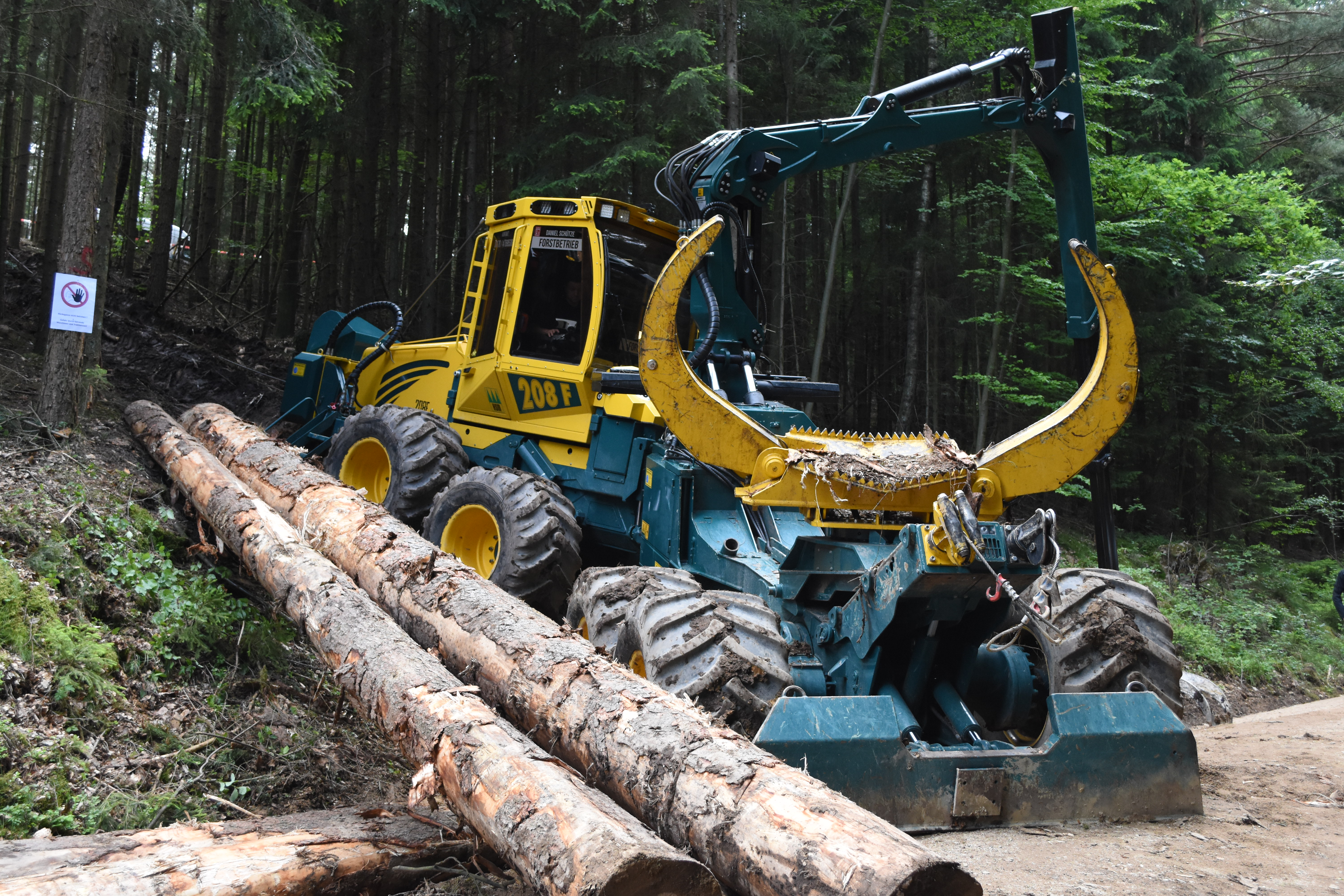
HSM 208F Clambunk skidder

Clambunk skidders are more of a middle ground between skidder and a forwarder. They have large free swiveling hydraulic jaws positioned on the back of the chassis that clamp the logs. They usually don't have self-loading capability and require feller buncher or other machine with loader arm.

== See also ==
- Feller buncher
- Forwarder
- Harvester
- Skidding (forestry)
- Washington Iron Works Skidder
