= Kauri gum =

Resin

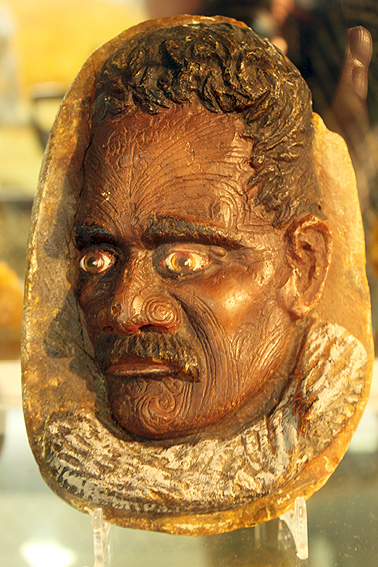
A 19th-century carving of a tattooed Māori man from kauri gum. The carving is owned and displayed by the Dargaville Museum, New Zealand.

Kauri gum is resin subfossil copal from kauri trees (Agathis australis), which historically had several important industrial uses. It can also be used to make crafts such as jewellery. Kauri forests once covered much of the North Island of New Zealand, before early settlers caused the forests to retreat, causing several areas to revert to weeds, scrubs, and swamps. Even afterwards, ancient kauri fields and the remaining forests continued to provide a source for the gum. Between 1820 and 1900, over 90% of Kauri forests were logged or burnt by Europeans.

Kauri gum forms when resin from kauri trees leaks out through fractures or cracks in the bark, hardening upon exposure to air. Lumps commonly fall to the ground and can be covered with soil and forest litter, eventually fossilising. Other lumps form as branches forked or trees are damaged, releasing the resin.

== Uses ==
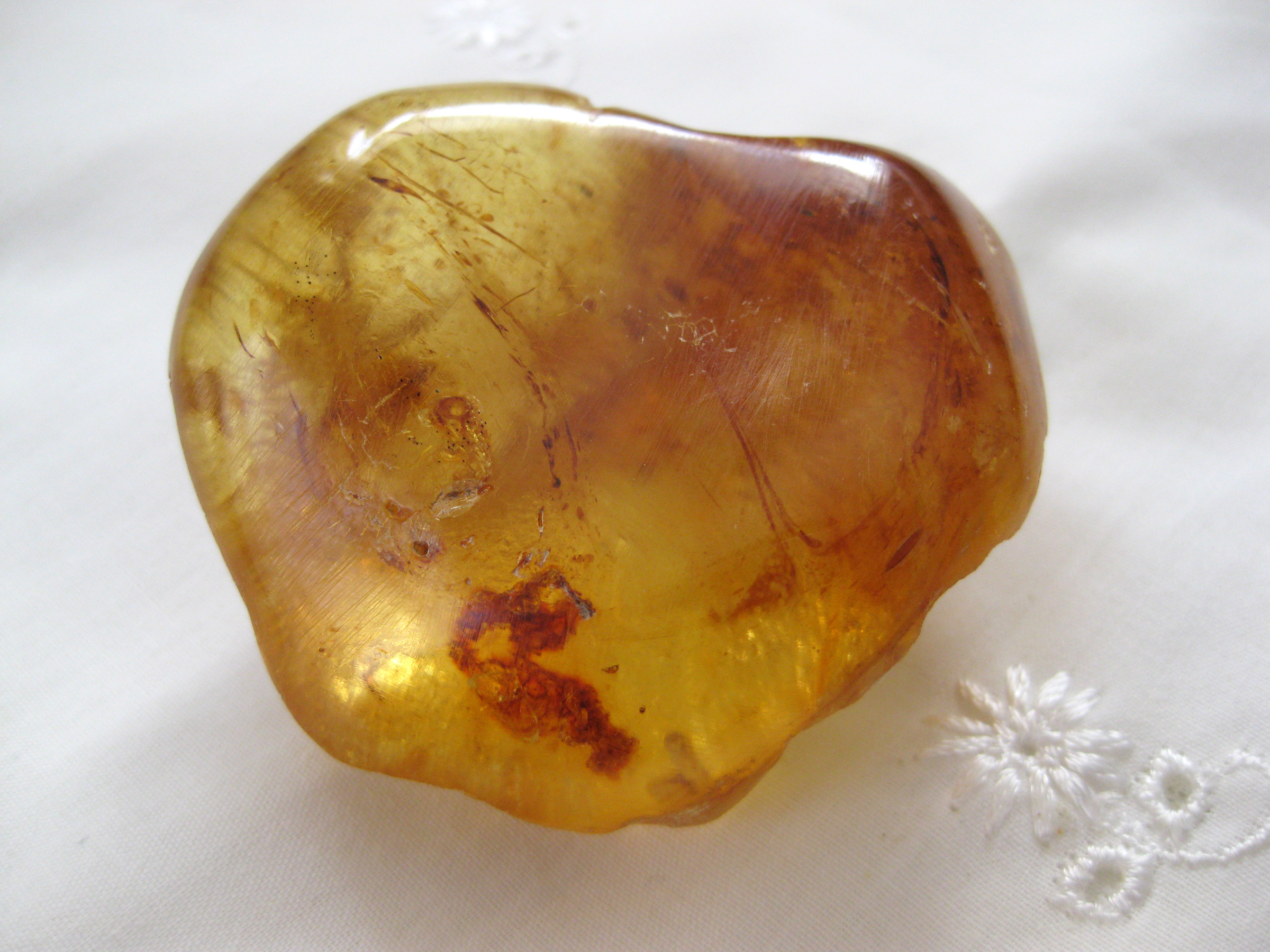
Kauri gum, polished

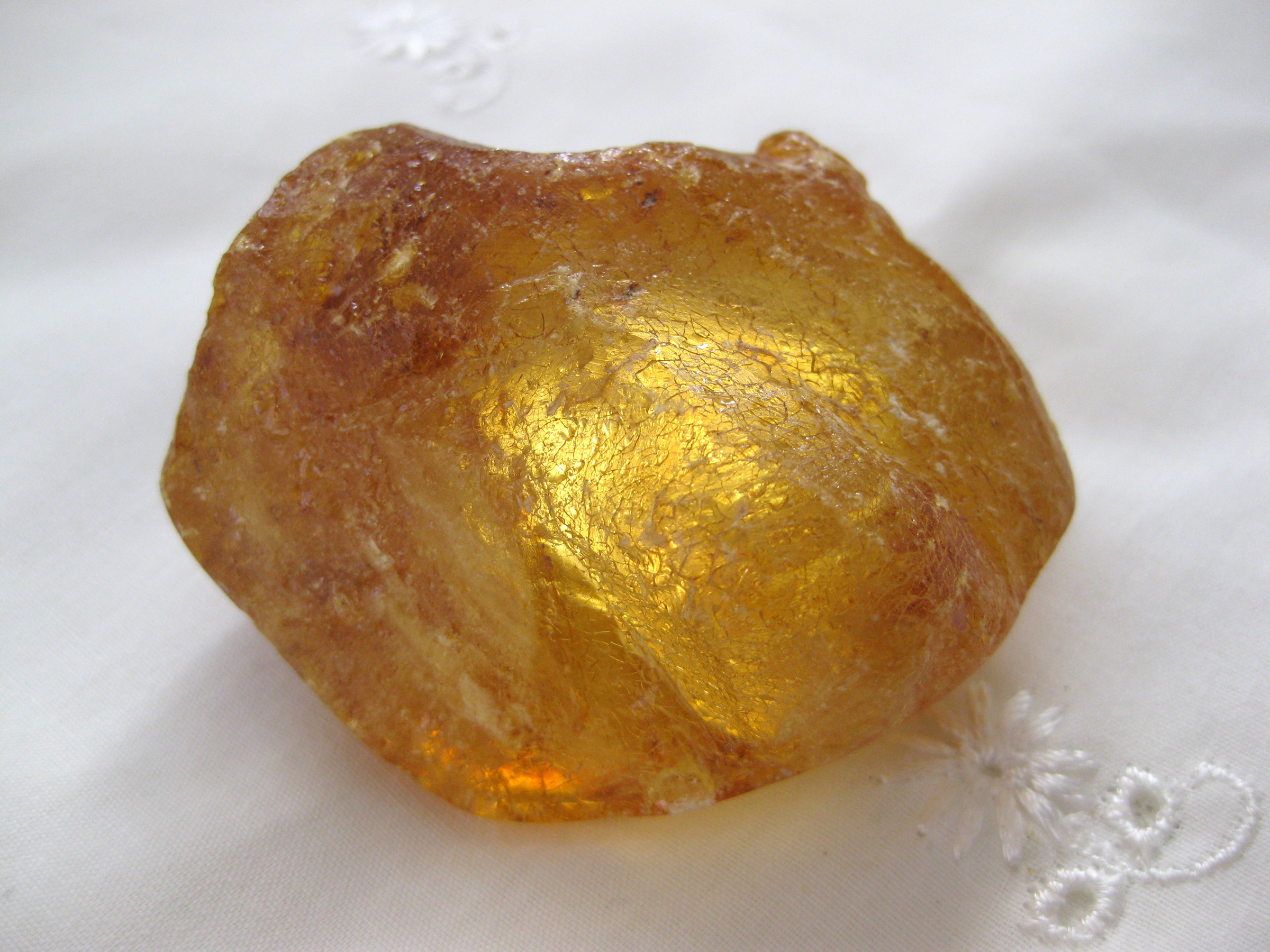
Kauri gum, unpolished

The Māori had many uses for the gum, which they called kāpia. Fresh gum was used as a type of chewing gum (older gum was softened by soaking and mixing with juice of the pūhā thistle). Highly flammable, the gum was also used as a fire-starter, or bound in flax to act as a torch. Burnt and mixed with animal fat, it made a dark pigment for moko tattooing. Kauri gum was also crafted into jewellery, keepsakes and small decorative items. Like amber, kauri gum sometimes includes insects and plant material.

Kauri gum was used commercially in varnish, and can be considered a type of copal (the name given to resin used in such a way). Kauri gum was particularly useful for this and, from the mid-1840s, was exported to London and America. Tentative exports had begun a few years earlier, for use in marine glue and as fire-kindlers; gum was part of an export cargo to Australia in 1814.

Since kauri gum would mix more easily with linseed oil at lower temperatures, by the 1890s 70% of all oil varnishes made in England used kauri gum. It was used to a limited extent in paints during the late 19th century, and from 1910 was used extensively in manufacturing linoleum. From the 1930s, the market for gum dropped as synthetic alternatives were found, but there remained niche uses for the gum in jewellery and specialist high-grade varnish for violins.

Kauri gum was Auckland's main export in the second half of the 19th century, sustaining much of the early growth of the city. Between 1850 and 1950, 450,000 tons of gum were exported. The peak in the gum market was 1899, with 11,116 tons exported that year, with a value of £600,000 ($989,700 US). The average annual export was more than 5,000 tons, with the average price gained £63 ($103.91 US) per ton.

== Appearance ==
The gum varied in colour depending on the condition of the original tree. It also depended on where the gum had formed and how long it had been buried. Colours ranged from chalky-white through red-brown to black. The most prized was pale gold, as it was hard and translucent. The size of each lump also varied greatly. Swamps tended to yield the small nuggets known as "chips", whereas hillsides tended to produce larger lumps. The majority were the size of acorns, although some were found which weighed a few pounds. The largest (and rarest) were reported to weigh half a hundredweight (25.4kg, 56lbs). Kauri gum shares a few characteristics with amber, another fossilised resin found in the Northern Hemisphere. While amber can be millions of years old, carbon-dating suggests the age of most kauri gum is a few thousand years.

== Gumfields ==
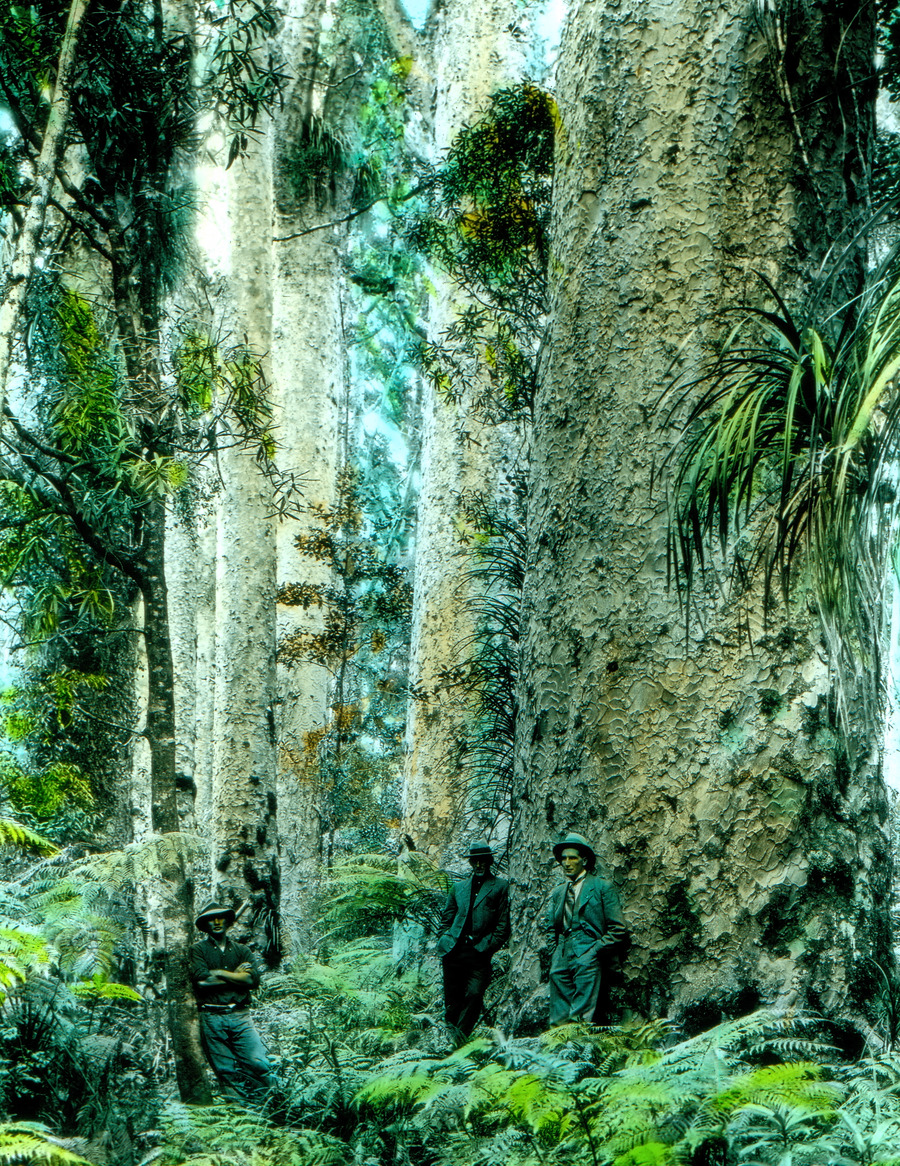
North Auckland Kauri Forest c. 1890 – c. 1910

Most of the gumfields were in Northland, Coromandel and Auckland, the site of the original kauri forests. Initially, the gum was readily accessible, commonly found lying on the ground. Captain Cook reported the presence of resinous lumps on the beach at Mercury Bay, Coromandel, in 1769, although he suspected it came from the mangroves, and missionary Samuel Marsden spoke of their presence in Northland in 1819.

By 1850, most of the surface gum had been harvested, and people began digging for it. The hillsides yielded shallow-buried gum (about 1 m), but in swamps and beaches it was buried much deeper (4 m or below).

== Gum-diggers ==
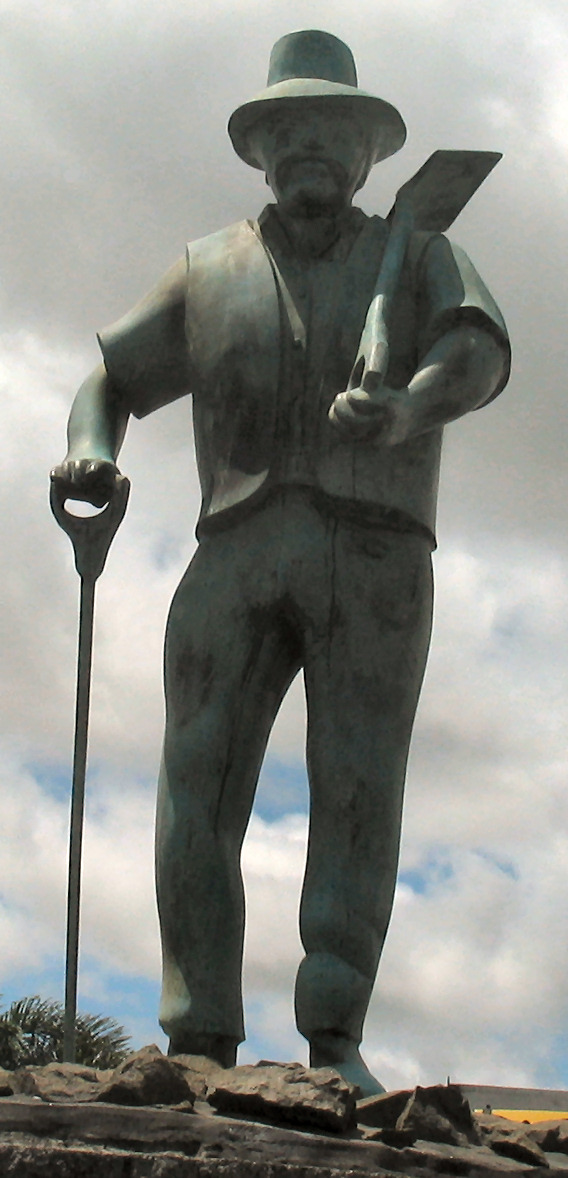
Gum-digger statue at Dargaville

Gum-diggers were men and women who dug for kauri gum in the old kauri fields of New Zealand at the end of the 19th and early 20th centuries. The term may be a source for the nickname "Digger" given to New Zealand soldiers in World War I. In 1898, a gum-digger described "the life of a gum-digger" as "wretched, and one of the last [occupations] a man would take to."

Gum-diggers worked in the old kauri fields, most of which were then covered by swamp or scrub, digging for gum. Much of the population was transient, moving from field to field, and they lived in rough huts or tents (which were called "whares", after the Māori for 'house'). It was extremely hard work and not well paid, but it attracted many Māori and European settlers, including women and children.

Gum-digging was the major source of income for settlers in North Auckland, and farmers often worked the gumfields in the winter months to subsidise the poor income from their unbroken land. By the 1890s, 20,000 people were engaged in gum-digging, of which 7000 worked full-time. Gum-digging was not restricted to settlers or workers in the rural areas; Auckland families would cross the Waitematā Harbour by ferry at weekends to dig in the fields around Birkenhead, causing damage to public roads and private farms, and leading to local council management of the problem.

=== Dalmatians ===
Dalmatians were groups of Croatian immigrants that fled the Balkans in the 19th century starting around the 1860s, due to growing growing tensions to come to the South Island goldfields, many eventually settled in the Coromandel peninsula. The Dalmatians were among the best gum diggers ever, forming coalitions to protect themselves and their earnings from extortionists, building shared housing from mānuka, nīkau, raupō. Thanks to their ingenuity they had innovated in the field of gum digging and carving, creating new digging tools and the best inclusion forgeries and carvings. The most famous Dalmatian invention is "The Kiwi Joker", a gum-tipped spiral wire spear for searching gum deposits.

The Dalmatians were transient workers, rather than settlers, and much of their income was sent out of the country, resulting in "The Austrian Question" in which they were mislabeled as Austrian, resulting in a series of laws being passed, primarily the "Kauri Gum Industry Act" that said only Māori and British subjects could acquire gum digging licenses. The law was later amended in 1910 to only allow British subjects to acquire gum digging licenses.

The Dalmatians got along well with local Māori, sharing food and resources. Māori too provided sleep quarters at times, famously sharing a feast and hāngī on New Years Day, 1911 at Houhora.

19th Century photograph of Dalmatians in Northland

Upon the outbreak of World War I the Dalmatians were declared enemy aliens and put into forced labour camps on low-pay public drainage, landscape and infrastructure projects. This led to the eventual ending of the Dalmatian groups.

=== Methods ===
Most gum was dug from the ground using gum-spears (pointed rods to probe for gum made by the Dalmatians) and "skeltons", defined as blade-edged spades for cutting through old wood and roots as well as soil. Once the gum was retrieved it would need to be scraped and cleaned. Gum-diggers in the Auckland region had access to "gum sheds" with an open fireplace where the gum was dried and sorted into different qualities or grades. Clear, transparent gum called "specimen gum" would often be found and would be put aside for use in high quality ornaments and trinkets.

Digging in swamps was more complicated. A longer spear (up to 8m) was often used, often fitted with a hooked end to scoop out the lumps. Scrub was often cleared first with fire; some became uncontrolled and swamp fires could burn for weeks. Holes were often dug by teams in both hills and swamps—often up to 12m deep—and some wetlands were drained to aid in the excavation of gum. As field gum became scarce, "bush gum" was obtained by purposely cutting the bark of kauri trees and returning months later to retrieve the hardened resin. Due to the damage caused to the trees by the cutting the practice was banned in state forests in 1905. Gum chips, small lumps useful for the manufacture of linoleum, were difficult to find. By 1910, the process of washing and sieving to retrieve the chips became common. The process was later mechanised.

== Gum merchants ==
Gumdiggers generally sold their gum to local gumbuyers, who transported it to Auckland (generally by sea) for sale to merchants and exporters. There were six major export firms in Auckland who dealt in gum, employing several hundred workers who graded and rescraped the gum for export, packing them in cases made from kauri timber.

As early as the 1830s and 1840s, merchants, including Gilbert Mair and Logan Campbell, were buying gum from local Māori for £5 ($8.25) a ton or trading it for goods. The majority of the gum was exported to America and London (from whence it was distributed throughout Europe), although smaller amounts were sent to Australia, Hong Kong, Japan and Russia.

== Gallery ==
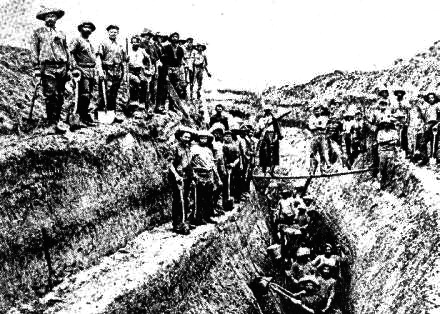
Group of gum-diggers in gumfield (1908)

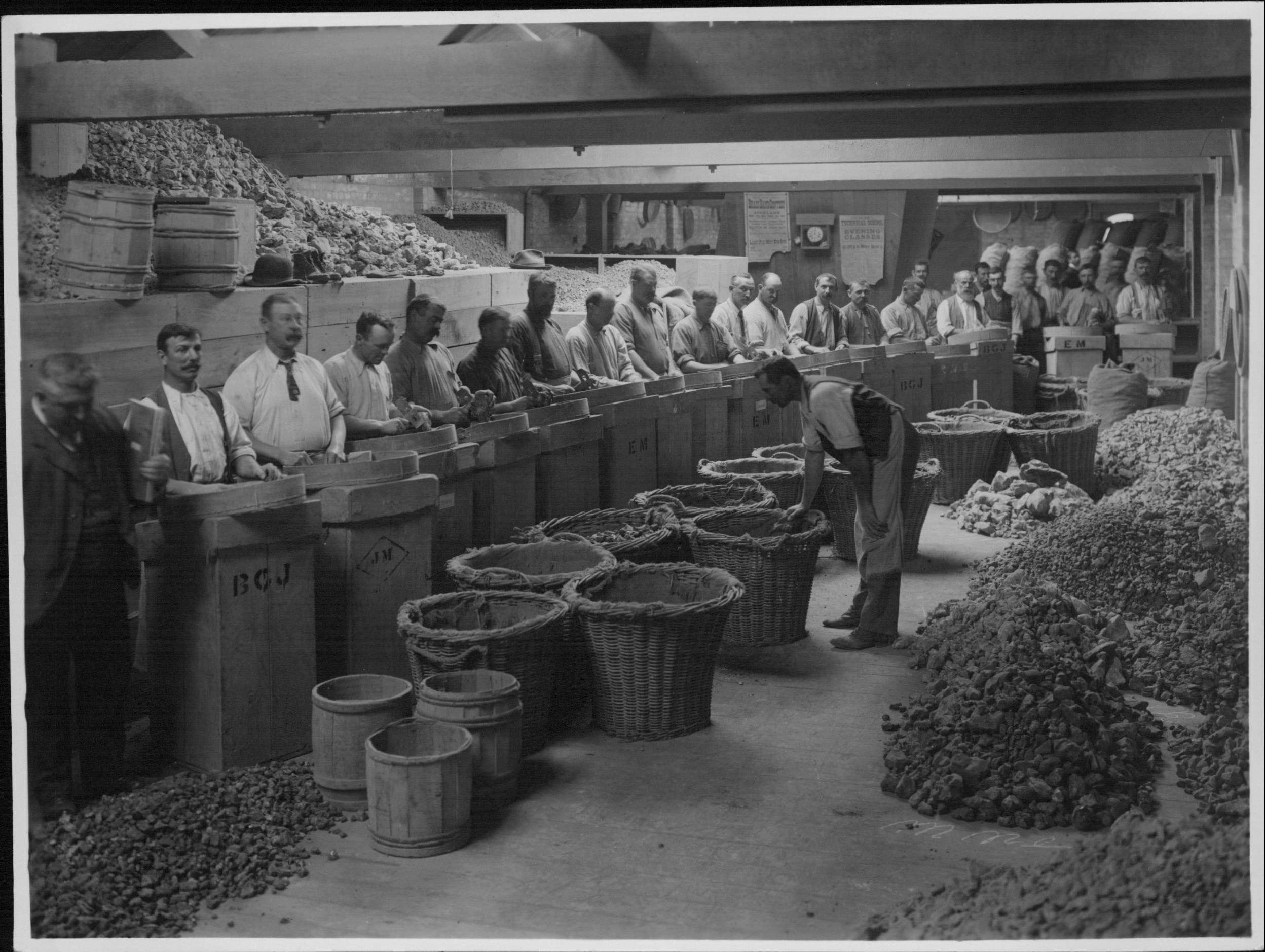
Gum sorting at the E. Mitchelson & Co. kauri gum and grain facility on the Auckland waterfront (1906)

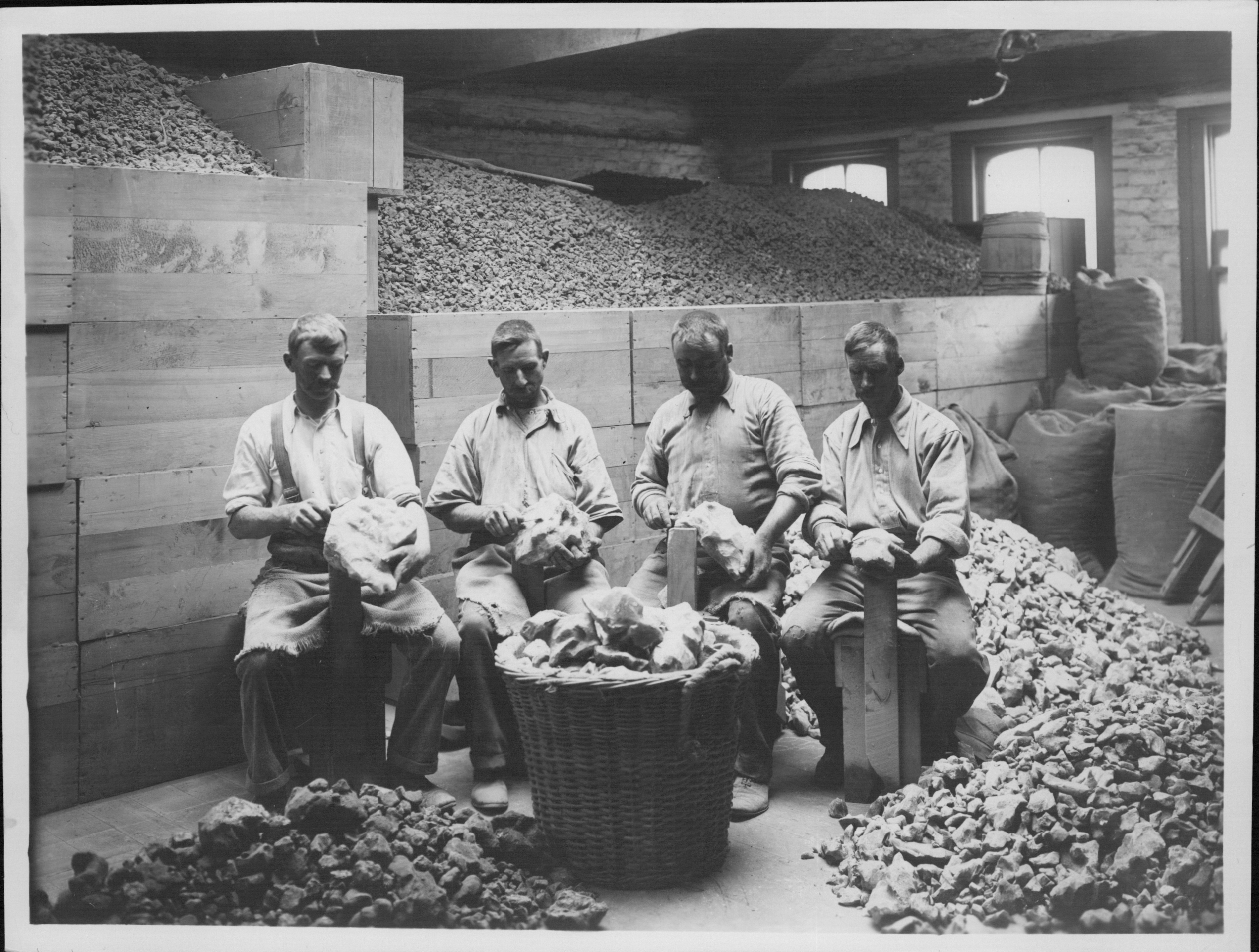
Gum rescraping at the E. Mitchelson & Co. kauri gum and grain facility (1906)

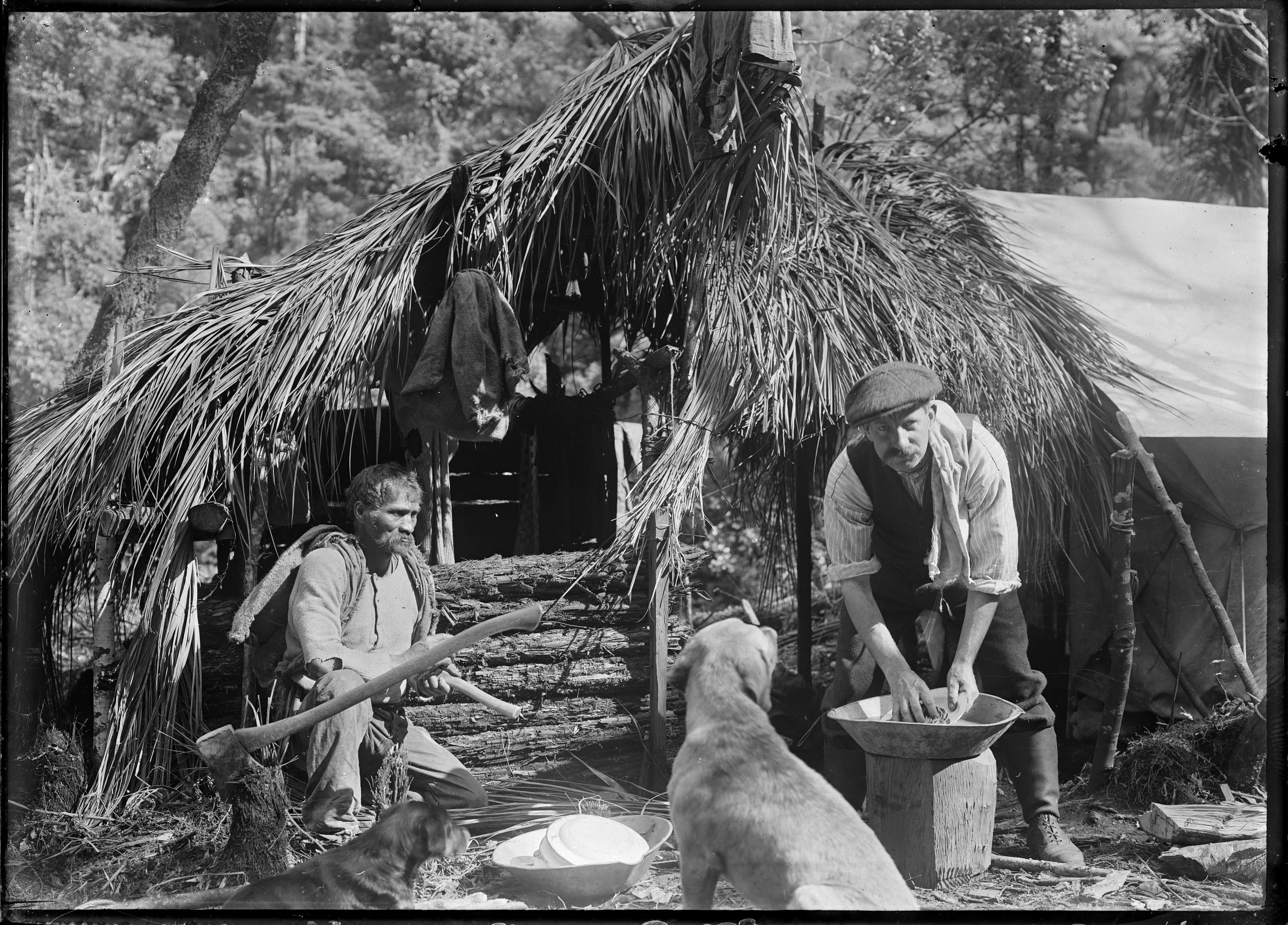
A Gum climbers' camp near the Waipapa River in Northland

== See also ==
- Kauri Museum
- Dammar gum
- Northland temperate kauri forests
