= Kauri Museum =

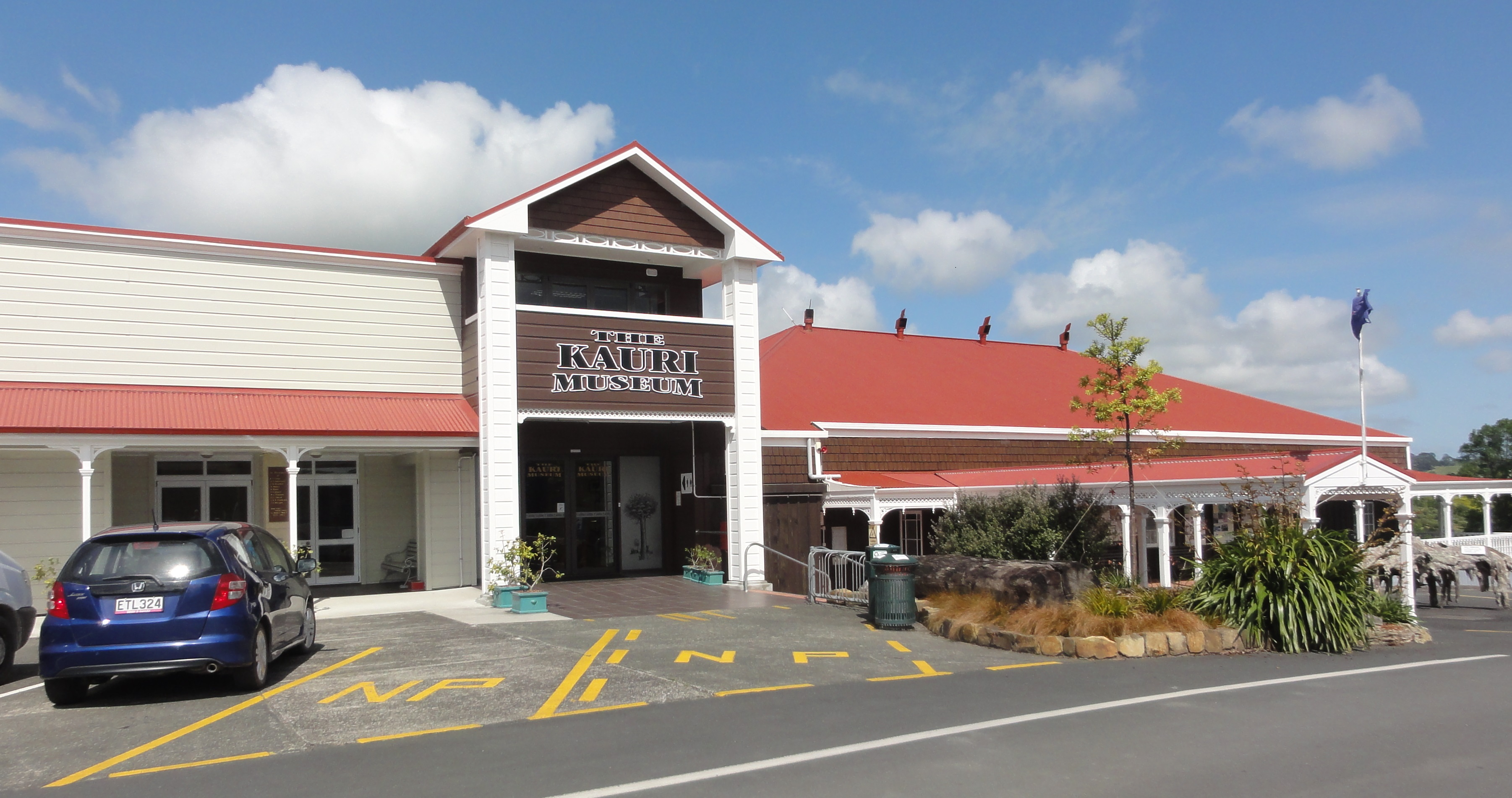
- Kauri Museum entrance
- Former name: Matakohe Pioneer Museum; Otamatea Kauri and Pioneer Museum; Matakohe Kauri Museum
- Established: 29 January 1962; 64 years ago
- Location: 5 Church Road, Matakohe, Northland, New Zealand
- Coordinates: 36.1300°S 174.1853°E
- Type: Forestry museums, local museum
- Website: www.kaurimuseum.com

The Kauri Museum is in the west coast village of Matakohe, Northland, New Zealand. The museum, to the south of the Waipoua Forest, contains many exhibits that tell the story of the pioneering days when early European settlers in the area extracted kauri timber and kauri gum.

== Collections ==
The museum has over 4,000 m^{2} (43,000 sq ft) of undercover exhibits, including the largest collection of kauri gum in the world, and the largest collection of kauri furniture. It has a model of a 1900s kauri house with furniture and models in the dress of the early years, and an extensive collection of photographs and pioneering memorabilia. On the wall, there are full-scale circumference outlines of the huge trees, including one of 8.5 m (28 ft), larger even than Tāne Mahuta. The museum includes a working mock-up of a steam sawmill.

It tells its story from the colonial viewpoint, and presents its representation of the kauri gum industry as part of the process of creating the New Zealand identity. It has little to say about negative aspects, such as the impact on the Māori people. The Kauri Museum has however helped raise awareness of the need to conserve the remaining forest through a display of photographs by the conservationist Stephen King, presented in partnership with the Waipoua Forest Trust.

== History ==
In 1957, the Old Time Transport Preservation League was established by tram enthusiast Graham Stewart and his cousin-in-law, Merv Sterling. Stewart approached the Auckland Transport Board in 1956, hoping to preserve one of the final trams operating in Auckland. After the closure of the line, the Auckland Transport Board presented the vehicle to Stewart, after finding no other organisations interested in caring for the tram. In May 1957, Stewart transported the tram to a plot of land in Matakohe, Northland, owned by cousin-in-law, Merv Sterling, and together they established the Old Time Transport Preservation League, a society which operated the Old Time Transport Museum. As the museum was soon running out of space for vehicles, the league worked together with the Royal Aeronautical Society of New Zealand and the Auckland Historical Society to lobby the Auckland City Council to establish a transportation museum in 1960, which became the Museum of Transport and Technology. Gradually, vehicles and exhibits were transported to MOTAT during the 1960s.

In 1961, a committee in Matakohe was formed to investigate how to celebrate the centennial celebrations of the Albertland settlers. The committee decided to establish a pioneer museum at Matakohe, at the former site of the Old Time Transport Museum. The Matakohe Pioneer Museum was opened on 29 January 1962 by Gilbert Archey, director of the Auckland War Memorial Museum, and at the time of opening it was the second district museum to be established in Northland, following the Russell Museum. Sterling remained in Matakohe as the curator of the museum.

The earliest kauri-related collections became a part of the Old Time Transport Museum in 1960, who staged an exhibition for the 1961 North Kaipara Agricultural Show, including an old bush tram and a kauri log felled from the Waipoua Forest in 1960. The kauri section of the museum had been intended to be transported to MOTAT after the museum was established in Auckland, however plans for this changed after MOTAT struggled to find space to house the kauri displays. The kauri log was incorporated into the Matakohe Pioneer Museum as a display when the museum opened, due to concerns that the log would degrade if left outside.

In 1966, the museum changed its name to become the Otamatea Kauri and Pioneer Museum. In the following year, the Tudor Collins wing of the museum was opened, joined by the Graeme Smith wing in 1969.

In 1969, the museum built a replica of the Kauauranga kauri dam, assisted by Herman Lennan, who had helped build the original dam in 1921. In the following year, the New Zealand Forest Service presented three kauri logs to the museum from the Waipoua Forest.

== Gallery ==
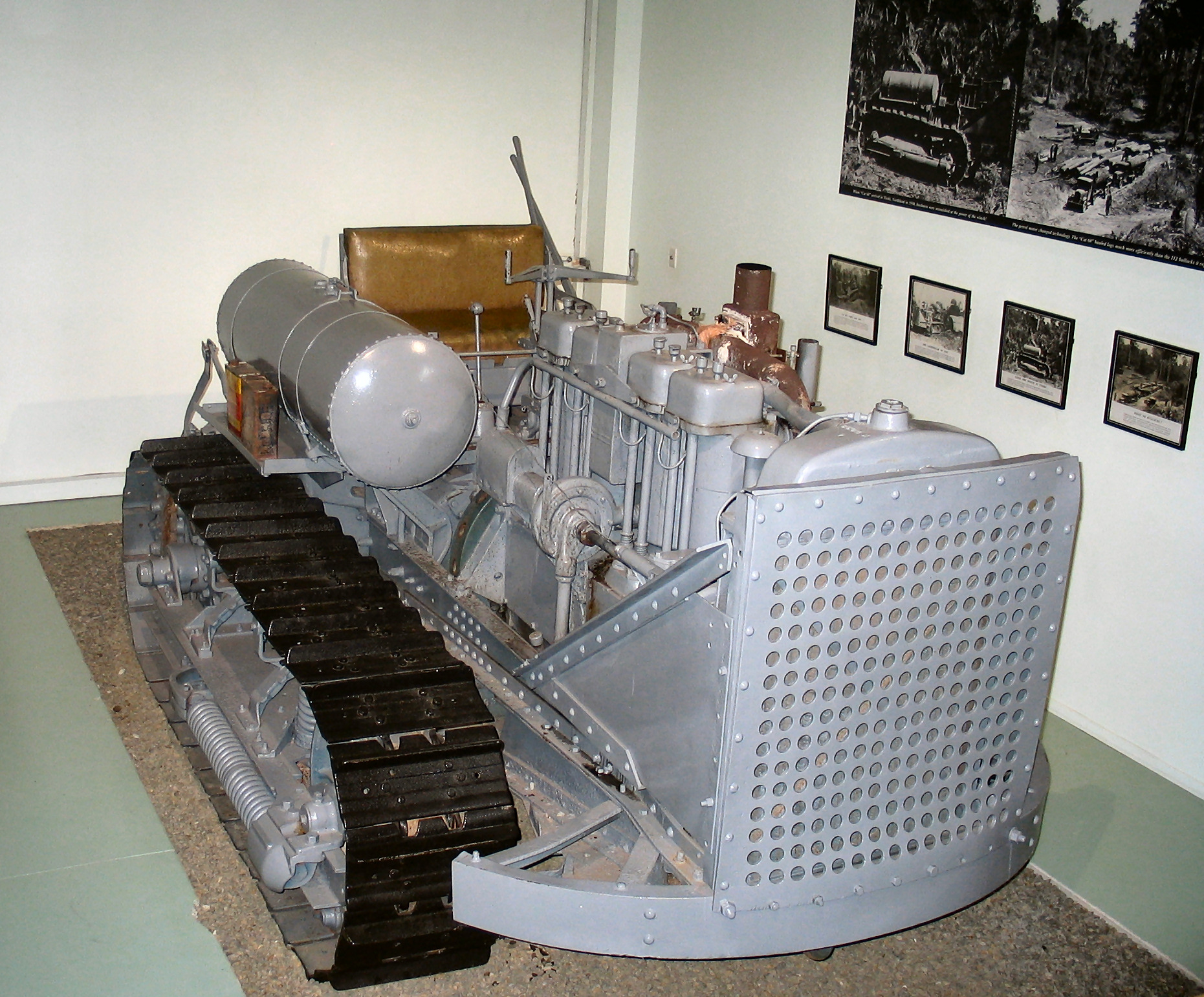
1929 Caterpillar Sixty on display in the Kauri Museum, which replaced eight bullock teams (112 animals) for hauling logs

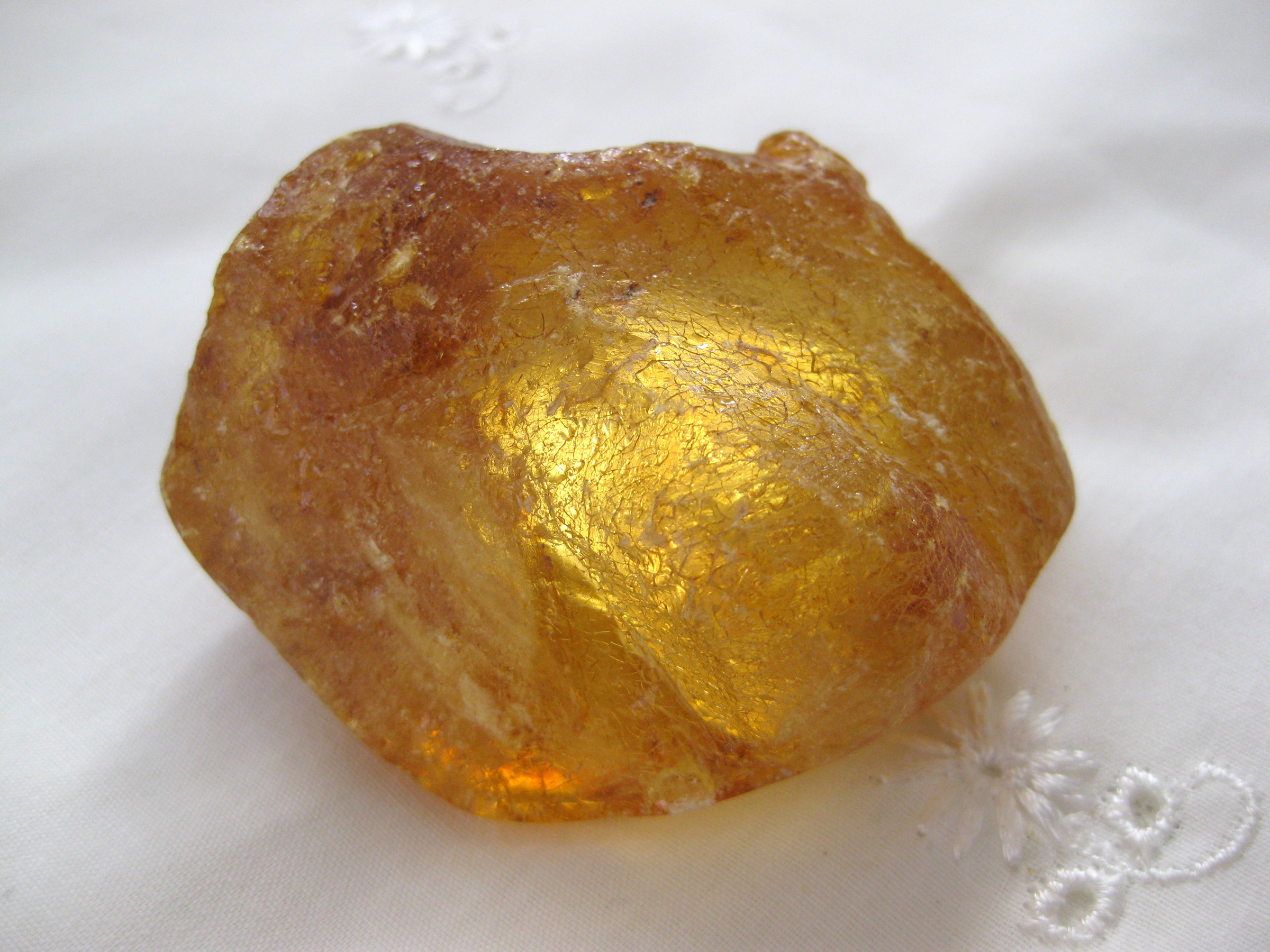
Kauri gum

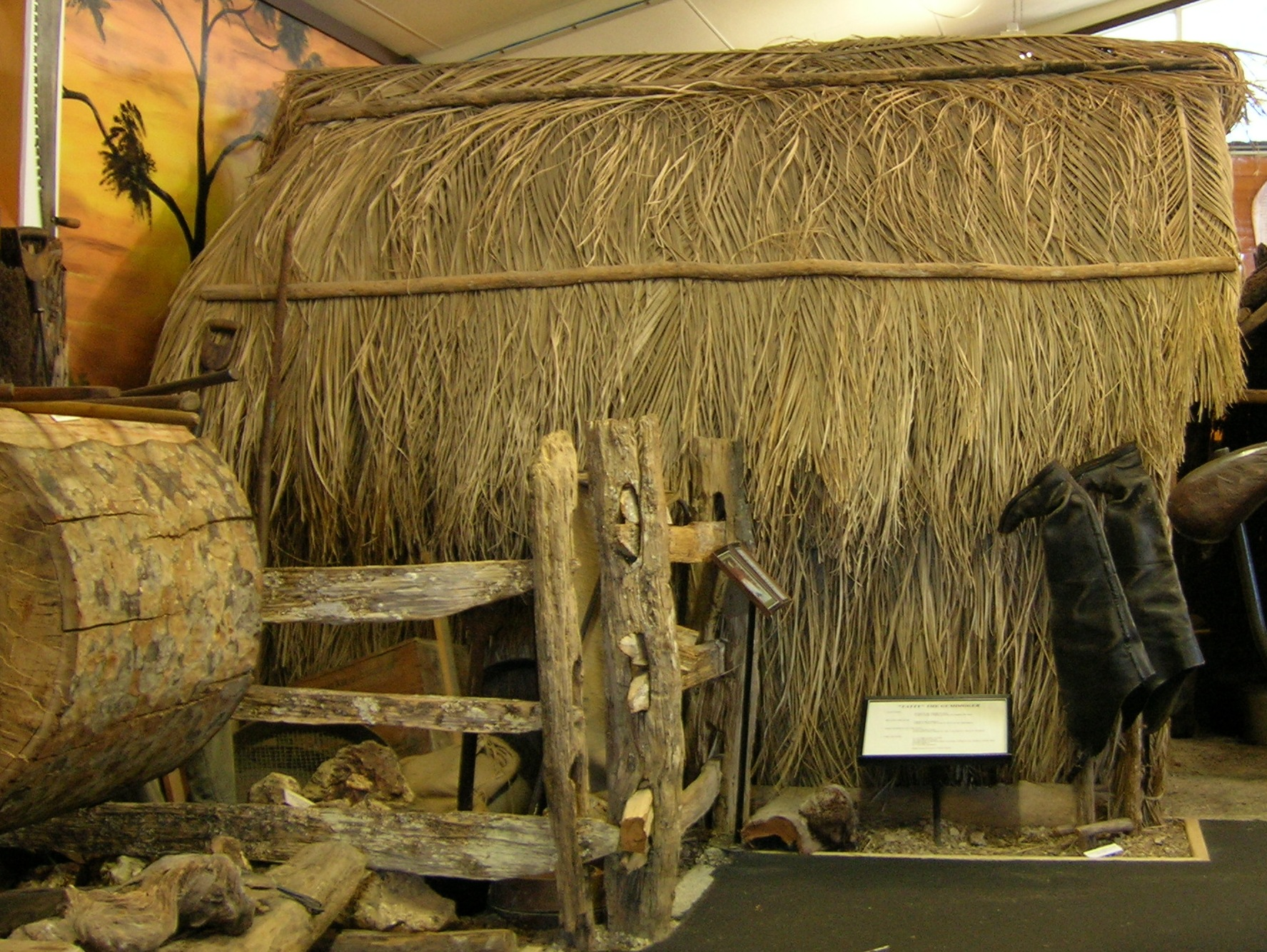
Gumdigger's hut
made from trunks and plaited leaves of the Nīkau

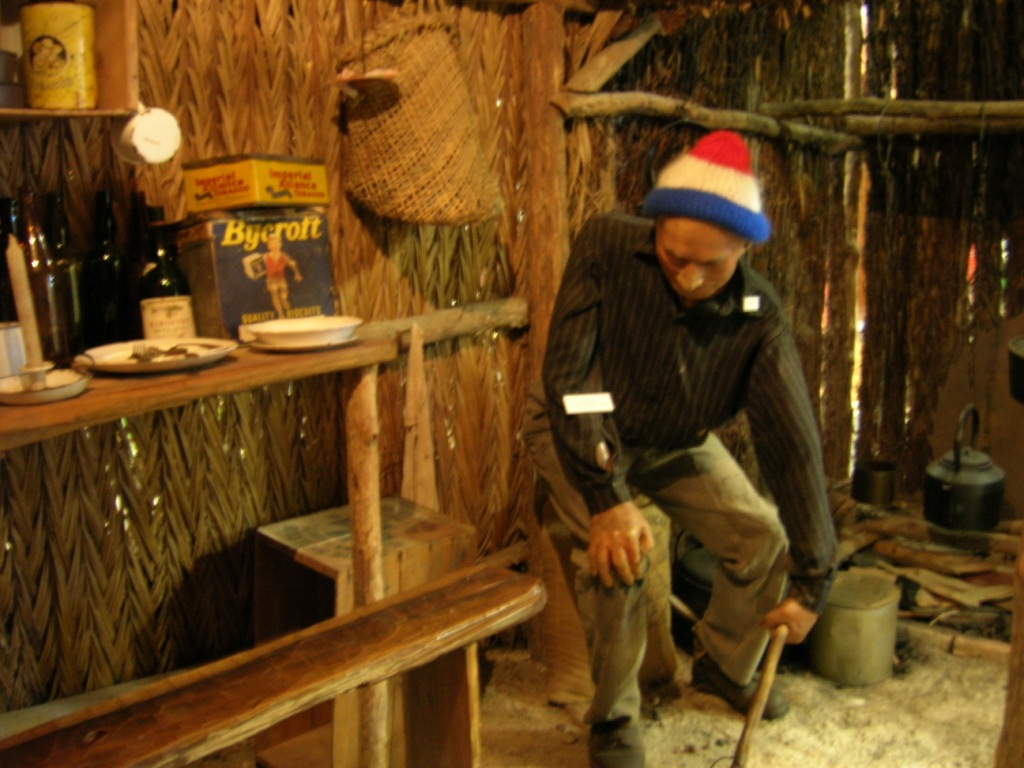
Inside the hut or whare

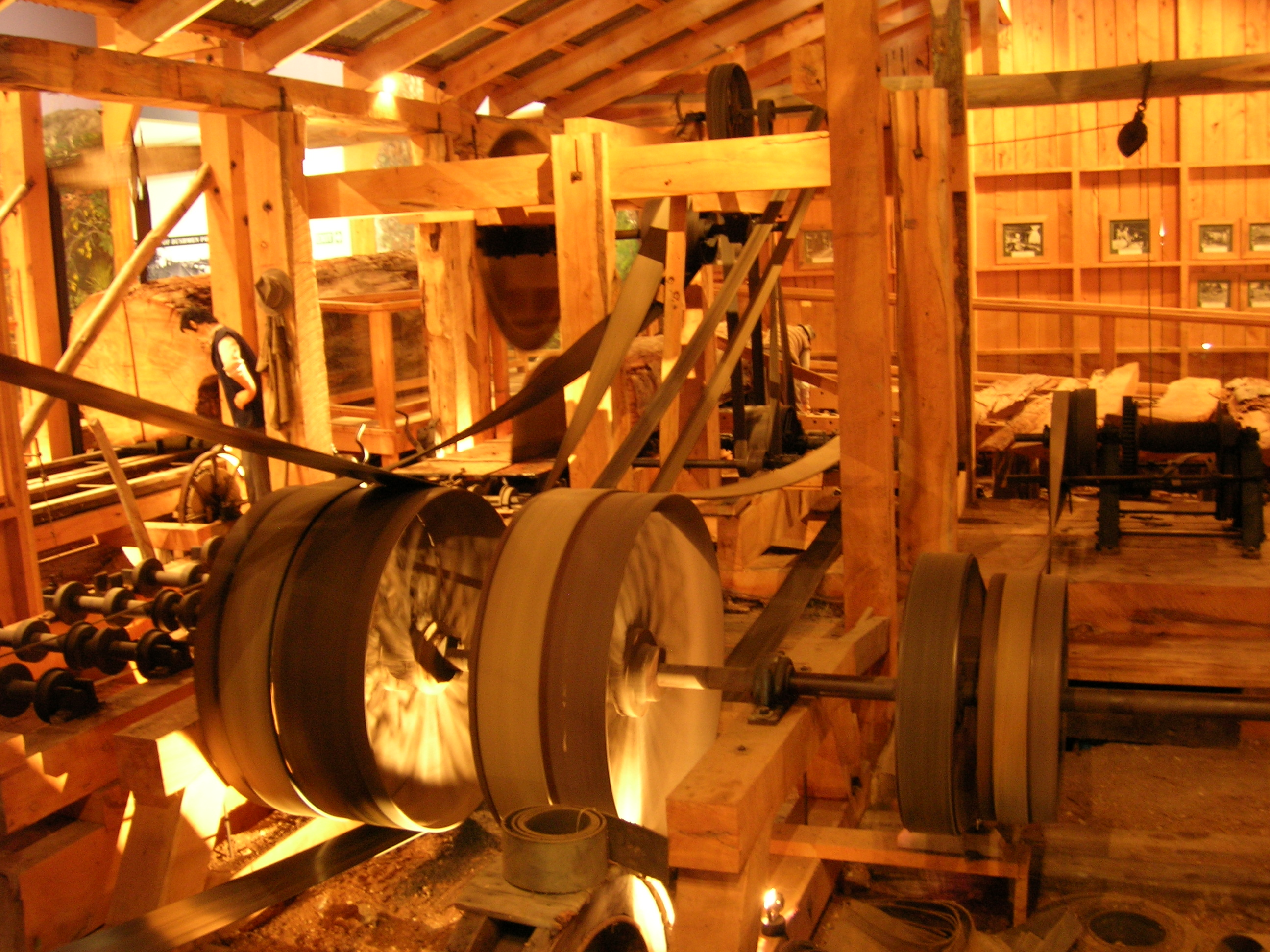
A real sawmill

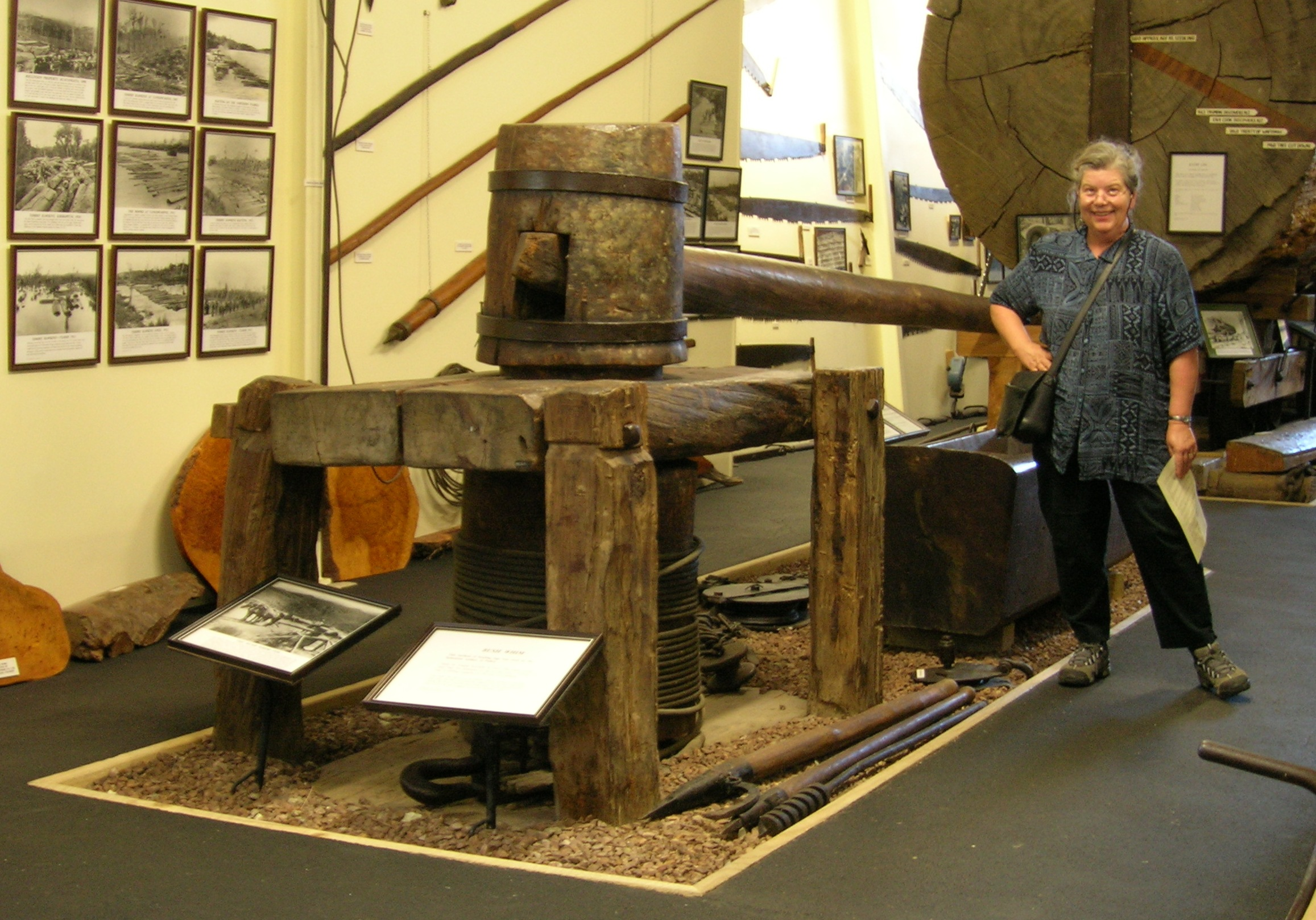
The real bush whim

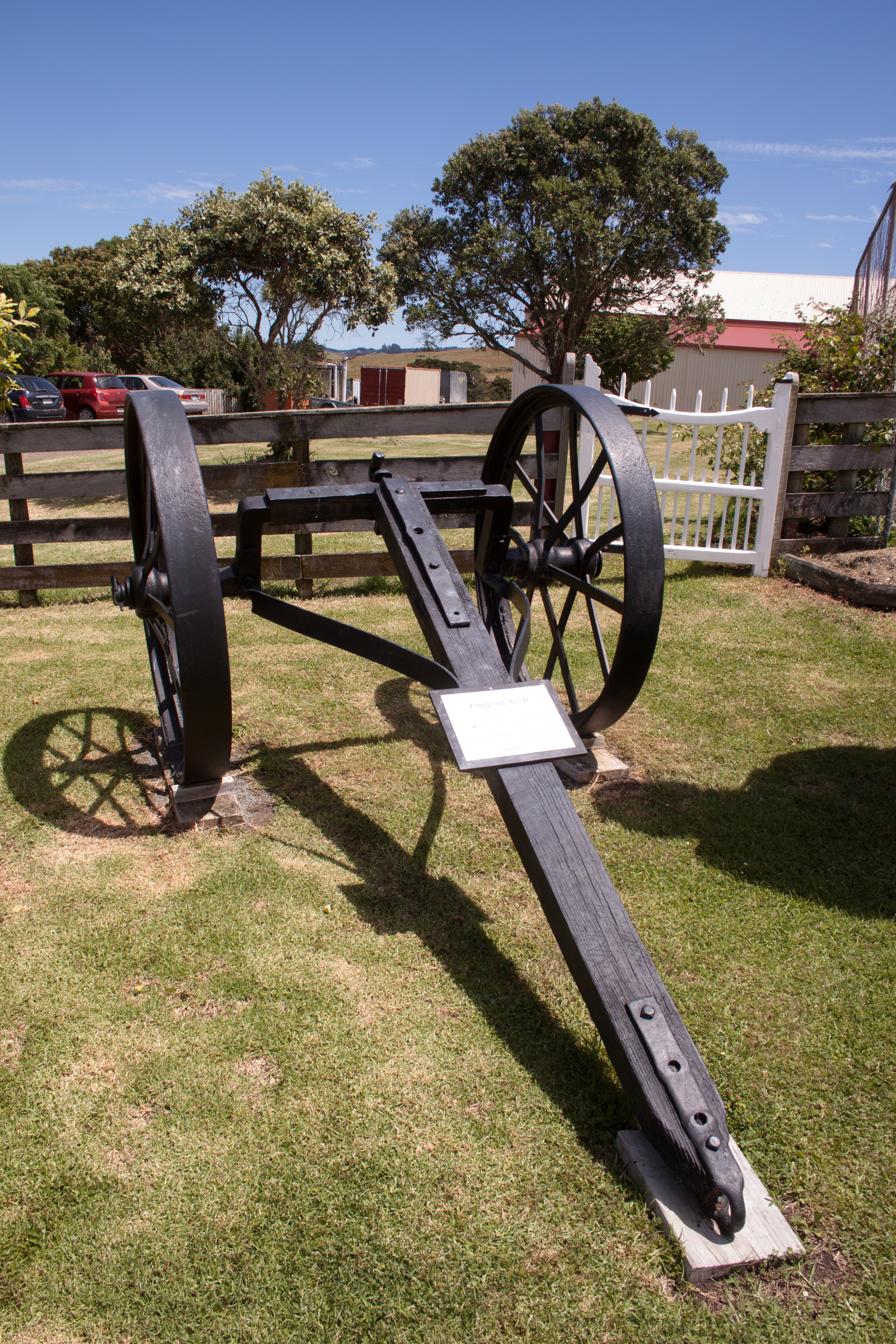
Logging arch on display at Kauri Museum

== Bibliography ==
- Gribble, Ray (1996). Stone, Harold (ed.). The Museum Makers: a Book that Details the Creation of Two Museums in New Zealand, which Have Become Significant Identities, Institutions within Their Own Communities. Matakohe: Otamatea Kauri & Pioneer Museum Trust Board, Matakohe Kauri Museum. ISBN 0473033712.
