= Quadrennial Fire Review =

The 2009 Quadrennial Fire Review (QFR) is a publication that examines the future of wildfire in the United States and provides insight and predictions about potential changes in mission, roles and responsibilities. It was called the fire community's "crystal ball," by Tom Harbour, Director of Fire and Aviation Management for the USDA Forest Service.

The QFR is not a policy or decision document, nor does it contain specific recommendations. Its purpose is to stimulate thought and discussion within the wildfire community about how the nation can best prepare for future wildfire seasons. According to the International Association of Fire Chiefs (IAFC), the QFR "was designed as a strategic evaluative process that develops an internal assessment of capabilities of current programs and resources in comparison to future needs for fire management."

The QFR is published every four years. The first QFR was completed in 2005 and the second published in January 2009 by the National Interagency Fire Center in Boise, Idaho; and the National Advanced Fire Research Institute in Tucson, Arizona. It is modeled on the Department of Defense's Quadrennial Defense Review.

The 2009 QFR was developed by fire experts from federal, state local and tribal organizations, plus assistance from non-governmental organizations and the research and academic communities. The overall effort was coordinated through the Brookings Institution. The QFR is not reviewed or approved by any government entity. It is meant to be an independent and objective document, free from political or agency influence. The QFR's projections of future conditions extend to a 10-to-20 year time frame, while the strategies for how to prepare for those future conditions is defined in a four-to-five-year period.

The QFR looks at trends and makes forecasts about what will need to change within the fire community to deal with future challenges. Among the notable forecasts in the 2009 QFR are:

- Climate change will produce longer fire seasons, with the potential of 10–12 million acres (40,000–49,000 km^{2}) burning in the United States by the year 2014. Also, wildfire will affect more geographic regions than in the past, specifically the Northeast and Great Lakes areas, which generally have been considered at low-risk. Alaska's fire vulnerability will increase, as well, as warmer temperatures dry out vegetation.
- The current drought cycle might last another 25 years, creating more stress on vegetation and contributing to a higher number of fires and more volatile fire behavior.
- Growth will slow in populated areas prone to wildfire (often called the wildland–urban interface, or WUI), but they will still be at high risk from wildfires.
- Fire agency budgets will be strained by increasing demands, rising costs and falling government revenues.
- The concept of "protecting all communities at all costs" should transition to "fostering self-reliance and increasing resiliency." The education focus should shift toward more self-reliance and accountability, producing "fire-adapted communities."
- Social networking will become the most effective means of informing and educating the public about fire, as traditional media and informational techniques continue to decline in popularity.

The 2009 QFR also outlines an integrated fuels management plan that would help ensure that fuels treatment investments are tied more closely to land stewardship objectives. It also suggests that small-scale fuels treatments (prescribed burning, mechanical removal of brush, thinning, chemical treatments, and so forth) are not as effective as larger, landscape-scale treatments in terms of ecosystem health.

The 2005 QFR was prescient. For example, it predicted a significant increase in the number and costs of wildfires, dramatic changes in weather, accelerated WUI growth, and continued fuel build-ups. All of these forecasts proved correct.

More than 100 people participated in developing the 2009 version of the QFR. The next QFR is scheduled for publication in 2012. Electronic copies of the QFR are available at the NIFC website,
