= Flight 965 =

Flight 965 may refer to

- Air Wisconsin Flight 965 (1980, Nebraska, U.S.), crashed in extreme weather conditions
- American Airlines Flight 965 (1995, Colombia), crashed into mountains — navigational error
