= Mann Gulch fire =

Coordinates: 46.8796°N 111.9049°W

- Mann Gulch Wildfire Historic District
- U.S. National Register of Historic Places
- U.S. Historic district
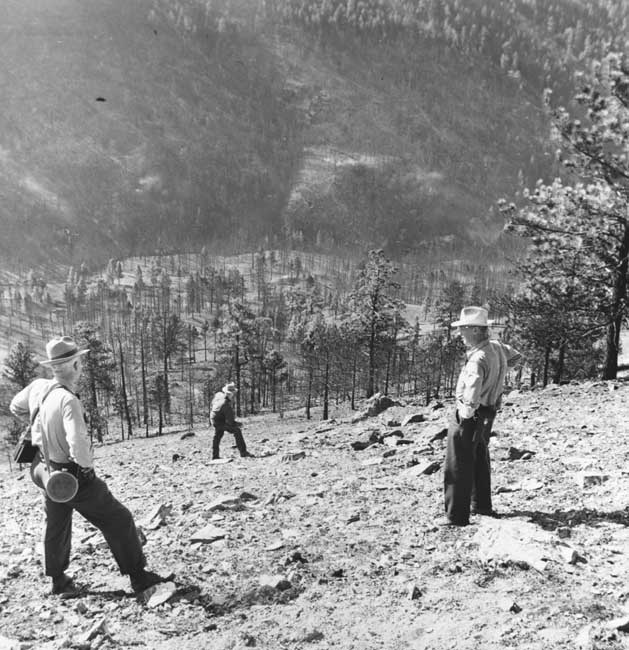
- Investigators stand on the steep, burned-out terrain of the north slope of Mann Gulch, 1949.

- Location within Montana Location within the United States
- Nearest city: Helena, Montana
- Area: 1,195 acres (484 ha)
- Built: 1949
- NRHP reference No.: 99000596
- Added to NRHP: May 19, 1999

The Mann Gulch fire was a wildfire started on August 5, 1949, in the Gates of the Mountain Wild Area, now named the Gates of the Mountains Wilderness, in Helena National Forest, in western Montana. A team of 15 smokejumpers parachuted in that afternoon. After joining up with a firefighter already on the ground, the 16 men were headed downhill to the river as a safe refuge because of increasing fire activity on the opposite, north-facing slope, but could not see for a time that the fire had spotted in front of them and had cut off their escape route, forcing them to turn back, uphill. The fire, meanwhile, began advancing on them rapidly, driven by up-gulch winds, and accelerated by the dry grass on the south-facing slope. Wind, slope, and fine fuel caused the fire to advance faster than they could retreat, and they were overrun. 12 smokejumpers and a ground-based firefighter were fatally burned. Two escaped unharmed by running up the fall line to a rock ridge where they found a crack through which they escaped. The foreman, Wagner Dodge, survived not by outrunning the fire, but by lighting an emergency backfire now known as an escape fire and jumping into the burned area, lying face down in the black while the main fire joined and passed around his flame front. He had ordered his men to follow but they refused and ran.

The United States Forest Service drew lessons from the tragedy of the Mann Gulch fire by designing new training techniques and safety measures that developed how the agency approached wildfire suppression and emergency management. The agency also increased emphasis on fire research and the science of fire behavior.

University of Chicago English professor and author Norman Maclean (1902–1990) researched the fire and its behavior for his posthumously published book Young Men and Fire (1992). Maclean, who had worked in northwestern Montana logging camps and for the Forest Service in his youth, recounted the events of the fire and ensuing tragedy and undertook an investigation of the fire's causes. Young Men and Fire won the National Book Critics Circle Award for nonfiction in 1992. The 1952 film Red Skies of Montana, starring actor Richard Widmark and directed by Joseph M. Newman, was loosely based on the events of the Mann Gulch fire.

The location of the Mann Gulch fire was added as a historical district to the United States National Register of Historic Places on May 19, 1999. A sign is placed near Mann Gulch to memorialize the tragedy, and can be seen from the waters of the nearby Missouri River.

== The fire ==
The fire started when lightning struck south of Mann Gulch, a tributary of the Missouri River that cuts through steep terrain for approximately five miles (8 km) in the Gates of the Mountains, The place was noted and named by Lewis and Clark on their journey west in 1805. The fire was spotted by forest ranger James O. Harrison around noon on August 5, 1949. Harrison, a college student at Montana State University, was working the summer as recreation and fire prevention guard for the Meriwether Canyon Campground. He had been a smokejumper the previous year but had given it up because of the danger. As a ranger, he still had a responsibility to watch for and help fight fires, but it was not his primary role. On this day, he fought the fire on his own for four hours before he met the crew of smokejumpers who had been dispatched from Hale Field, Missoula, Montana, in a Douglas DC-3.

=== Contributing factors ===
Several factors that combined to create the disaster are described in Norman Maclean's book Young Men and Fire.

- Steep Slope – Fire spreads faster up a slope, and the south facing slope north of Mann Gulch was up to 76% along the fall line. However, the slope along the path of travel was 18% on average.
- Fuel – Fire spreads fast in dry grass. The south facing slope of Mann Gulch was mostly knee high cheatgrass, an especially volatile fuel. Additionally, the burn-over incident occurred on a hot day, on a south-facing slope, in the early afternoon. All of these factors would have contributed to the volatility of the fire, as they would have decreased fuel moisture
- Communication – The crew's single radio broke because its parachute failed to open. It could have possibly prevented the disaster or helped get aid more quickly to the two burned men who died later. There were other dangerous fires going on at the same time and without radio contact, Forest Service leaders did not know what was happening on Mann Gulch.
- Weather – The season was very dry and that day was extremely hot. Winds in the Gulch were also strong "up gulch," the same direction in which the men tried to run.

== Airplane ==
The C-47/DC-3 "Miss Montana" (a name applied during the eventual restoration, not used at the time of the fire and use by Johnson), registration number NC24320, was the only smokejumper plane available at Hale Field, near the current location of Sentinel High School, on August 5, 1949, when the call came in seeking 25 smokejumpers to fight a blaze in a hard-to-reach area of the Helena National Forest. The C-47/DC-3 could only hold 16 jumpers and their equipment. Even though more help was needed, fire bosses decided not to wait for a second plane, and instead sent No. NC24320 out on its own. NC24320 flew with Johnson Flying Service from Hale Field in Missoula, Montana and was used to drop smokejumpers as well as for other operations for which Johnson Flying Service held contracts. “Miss Montana” has since been restored to airworthy condition and still flies out of Missoula.

== Incident ==
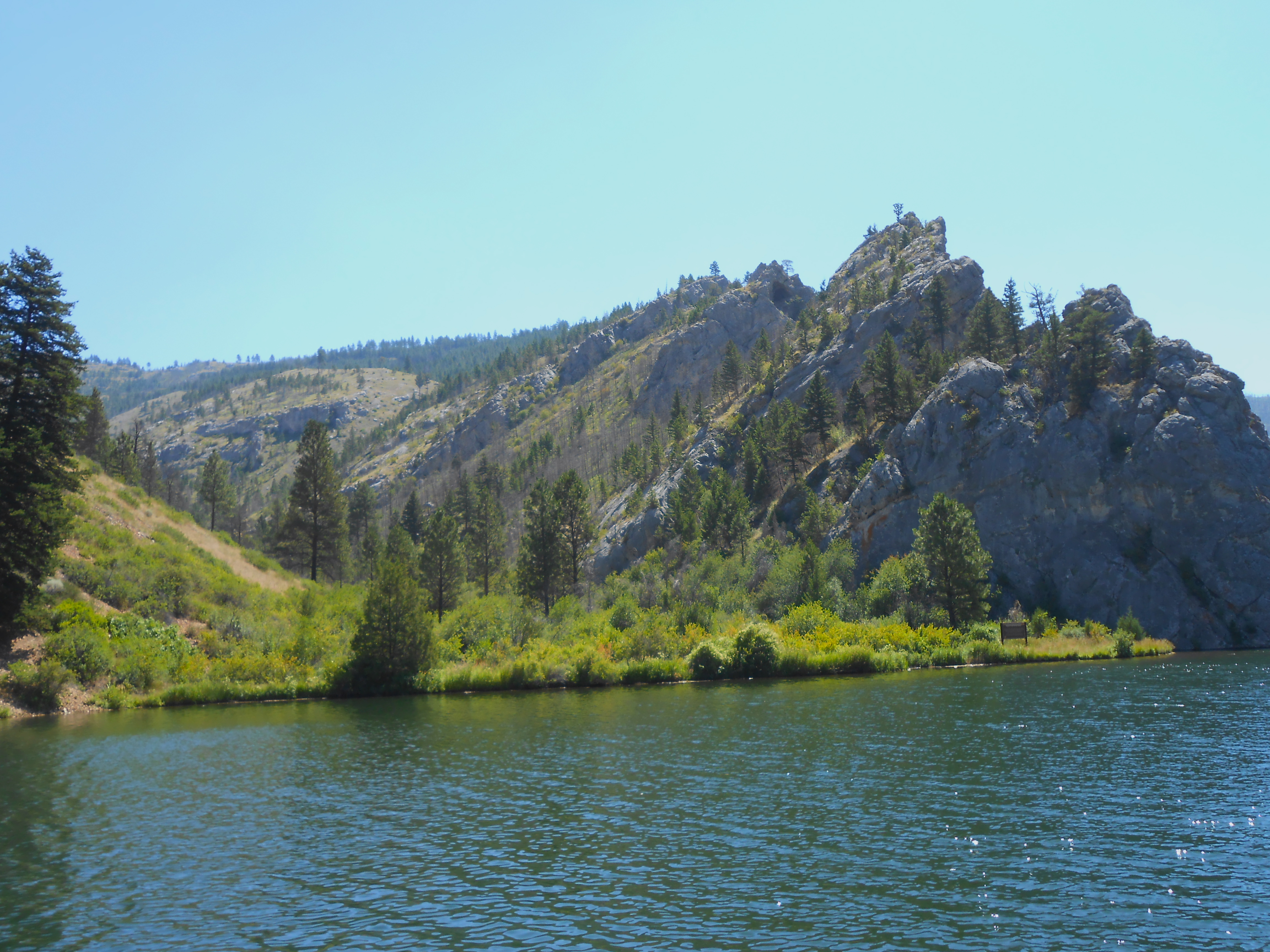
Mann Gulch in 2013, looking southeast from the Missouri River. The fire came down off the near end of the ridge on the right into the gulch and "blew up", overtaking the fleeing smokejumper crew on the ridge to the left.

It was hot, with a temperature of 97 °F (36 °C), and the fire danger rating was high, rated 74 out of a possible 100. Wind conditions were turbulent. The plane flight was especially rough. One smokejumper got sick on the way and did not jump, returning with the airplane to Hale Field. Getting off the plane, he resigned from the smokejumpers. The remaining 15 smokejumpers parachuted into an open area at the top of the gulch. Below them, they could see the fire burning on the ridge south of Mann Gulch toward the Missouri River. Gear and individual jumpers were scattered widely due to the turbulent conditions. Their radio was destroyed after its parachute failed to open. After the smokejumpers had landed, a shout was heard coming from the front of the fire. The foreman, Wagner "Wag" Dodge, went out ahead to find the person shouting and to scout the fire. He left instructions for the team to finish gathering their equipment and eat, and then advance to the front of the fire. The voice turned out to be Jim Harrison who had already been fighting the fire alone for four hours.

The two headed back up the gulch, and Dodge noted that one could not get closer than 100 feet (30 m) to the fire due to the heat. The crew met Dodge and Harrison about halfway to the fire. Dodge instructed the team to move off the front of the fire, and instead "sidehill" (keeping to the same contour or elevation), and cross over to the thinly forested and grass-covered south-facing slope, north of the stream, where they would move "down gulch" (west towards the confluence between Mann Gulch and the Missouri River). They could then fight the fire from the flank and steer it toward a low-fuel area. Dodge returned with Harrison to the supply area at the top of the gulch. The two stopped there to eat. From the high vantage point, Dodge noticed the smoke along the fire front boiling up, indicating an intensification of the heat of the fire. He and Harrison headed down the gulch to catch up with the crew.

=== "Blow up" ===
By the time Dodge reached his men, the fire west of them, down-gulch toward the Missouri River, had already jumped from the ridge south of Mann Gulch to the bottom of the south facing slope north of the stream. The intense heat, combined with wind coming off the river, and the upslope direction of the burn (which pre-dries and heats the fuel, and leads to much faster fire movement when a fire is burning up-slope) pushed the flames up the gulch in the dry grass of the south facing slope, causing what fire fighters call a "blow up". Various side ridges running down the slope obscured the crew's view, so they could not see the conditions further down the gulch, and they initially continued to move toward the fire. When Dodge finally got a glimpse of what was happening, he turned the men around and started them angling back up upslope and up the gulch. Within a couple hundred yards, he ordered the men to drop their Pulaskis, shovels, and crosscut saws:

Dodge's order was to throw away just their packs and heavy tools, but to his surprise some of them had already thrown away all of their heavy equipment. On the other hand, some of them wouldn't abandon their heavy tools, even after Dodge's order. Diettert, one of the most intelligent of the crew, continued carrying both his tools until Rumsey caught up with him, took his shovel and leaned it against a pine tree. Just a little further on, Rumsey and Sallee passed the recreation guard, Jim Harrison, who, having been on the fire all afternoon, was now exhausted. He was sitting with his heavy pack on and was making no effort to take it off.

By this point, the fire was moving extremely quickly up the 76% incline of the northern slope (37 degree slope) of Mann Gulch, and Dodge realized they would not be able to make the ridge line in front of the fire. With the fire less than 100 yards (90 m) behind, he took a match out and set fire to the grass in front of them. In doing so, he was attempting to create an escape fire to lie in so that, deprived of fuel, the main fire would pass the new, burned-out clearing and divert around him and his crew. In the back draft of the main fire, the grass fire Dodge had set burned in the direction toward the ridge above. Turning to the three men by him — Robert Sallee, Walter Rumsey, and Eldon Diettert — Dodge said, "Up this way," but the men misunderstood him. The three ran straight up for the ridge crest, moving up along the far edge of Dodge's fire. Sallee later said he was not sure what Dodge was doing, and thought perhaps he intended the fire to act as a buffer between the men and the main fire. It was not until he got to the ridge crest and looked back down that he realized what Dodge had intended. As the rest of the crew came up, Dodge tried to direct them through the fire he had set and into the center burnt out area. Dodge later stated that someone, possibly squad leader William Hellman, said, "To hell with that, I'm getting out of here." The rest of the team raced past Dodge up the slope toward the hogback of Mann Gulch ridge, hoping they had enough time to get through the rock ridge line to safer ground on the other side. Only Dodge entered the burned-out area of his escape fire.

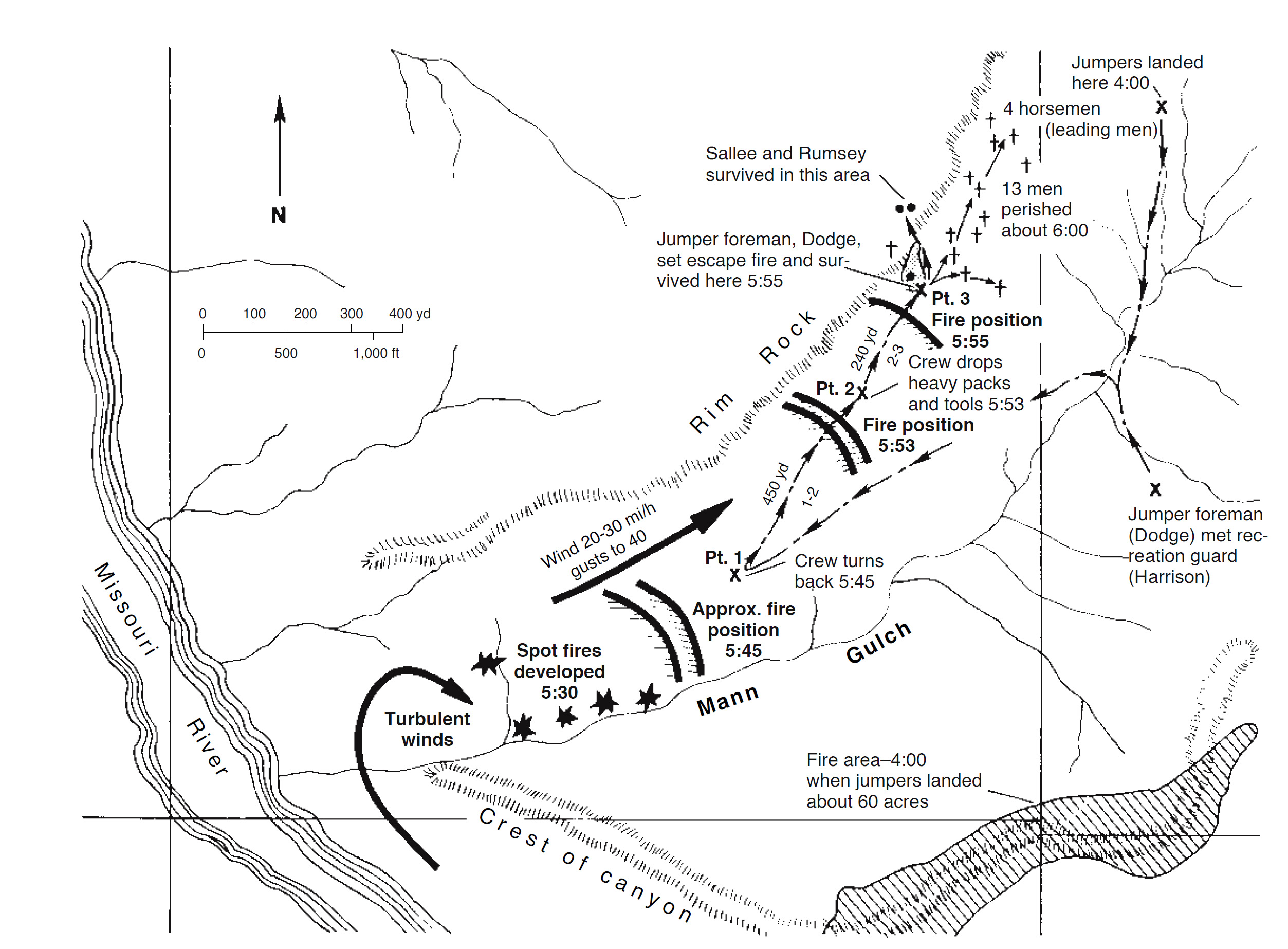
Rothermel's 1993 paper provided this map and timeline recreating the events of the Mann Gulch fire disaster on August 5, 1949.

=== Immediate outcome ===
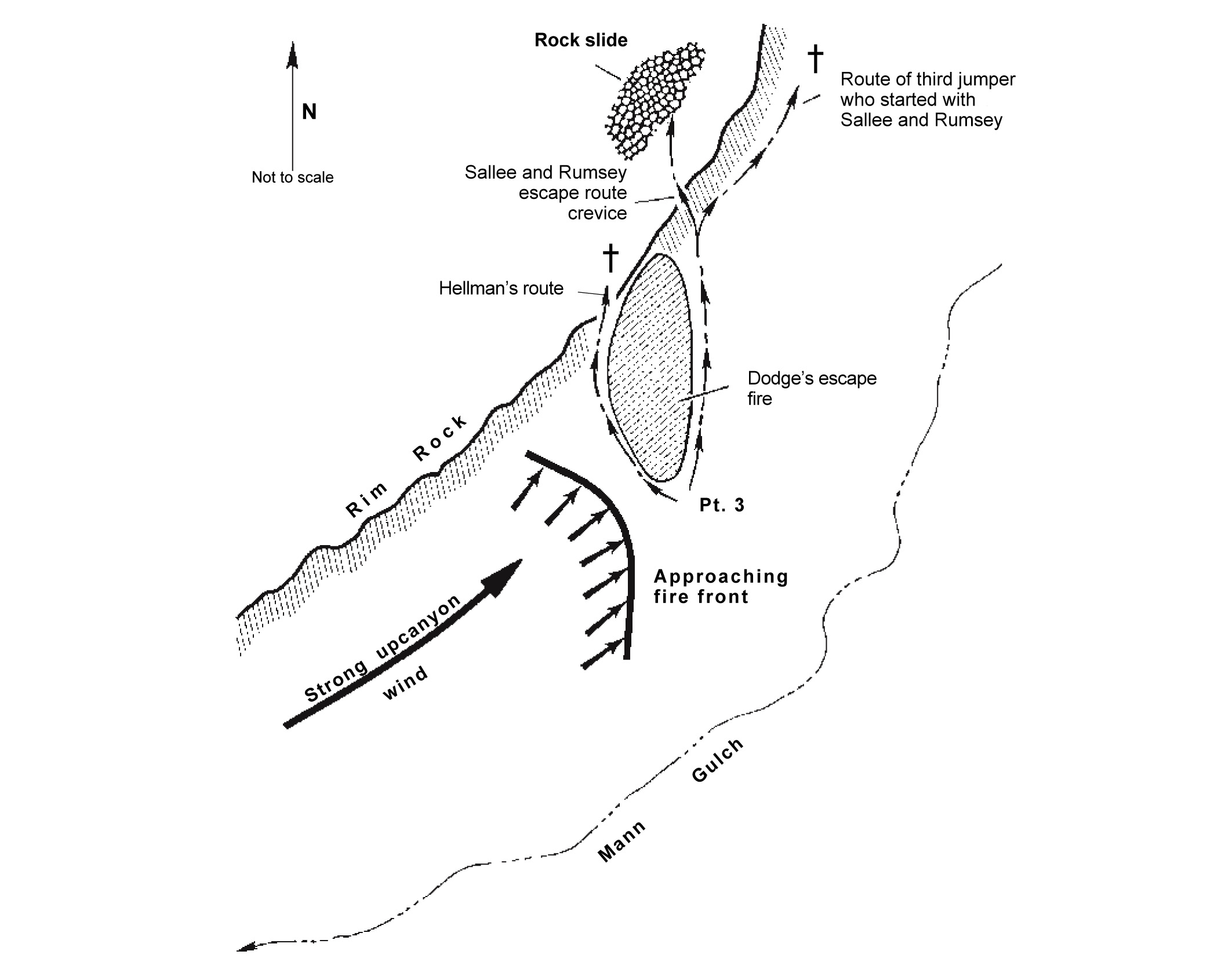
The route the men took to the ridge, including the location of the three survivors.

Four of the men reached the ridge crest, but only two, Bob Sallee and Walter Rumsey, managed to escape through a crevice or deep fissure in the rock ridge to reach the other side. In the dense smoke of the fire, the two had no way of knowing if the crevice they found actually "went through" to the other side or would be a blind trap. Diettert had been just to the right, slightly upgulch of Sallee and Rumsey, but he did not drop back to the crevice and continued on up the right side of the hogback. He did not find another escape route and was overtaken by the fire. Sallee and Rumsey came through the hogback to the ridge crest above what became known as Rescue Gulch. Dropping down off the ridge, they managed to find a rock slide with little to no vegetation. They waited there for the fire to overtake them, moving from the bottom of the slide to the top as the fire moved past. Hellman was caught by the fire on the top of the ridge and was badly burned. Though he and Joseph Sylvia initially survived the fire, they suffered heavy injuries and both died in the hospital the next day. Wag Dodge entered the charred center of the escape fire he had built and survived the intensely burning main fire.

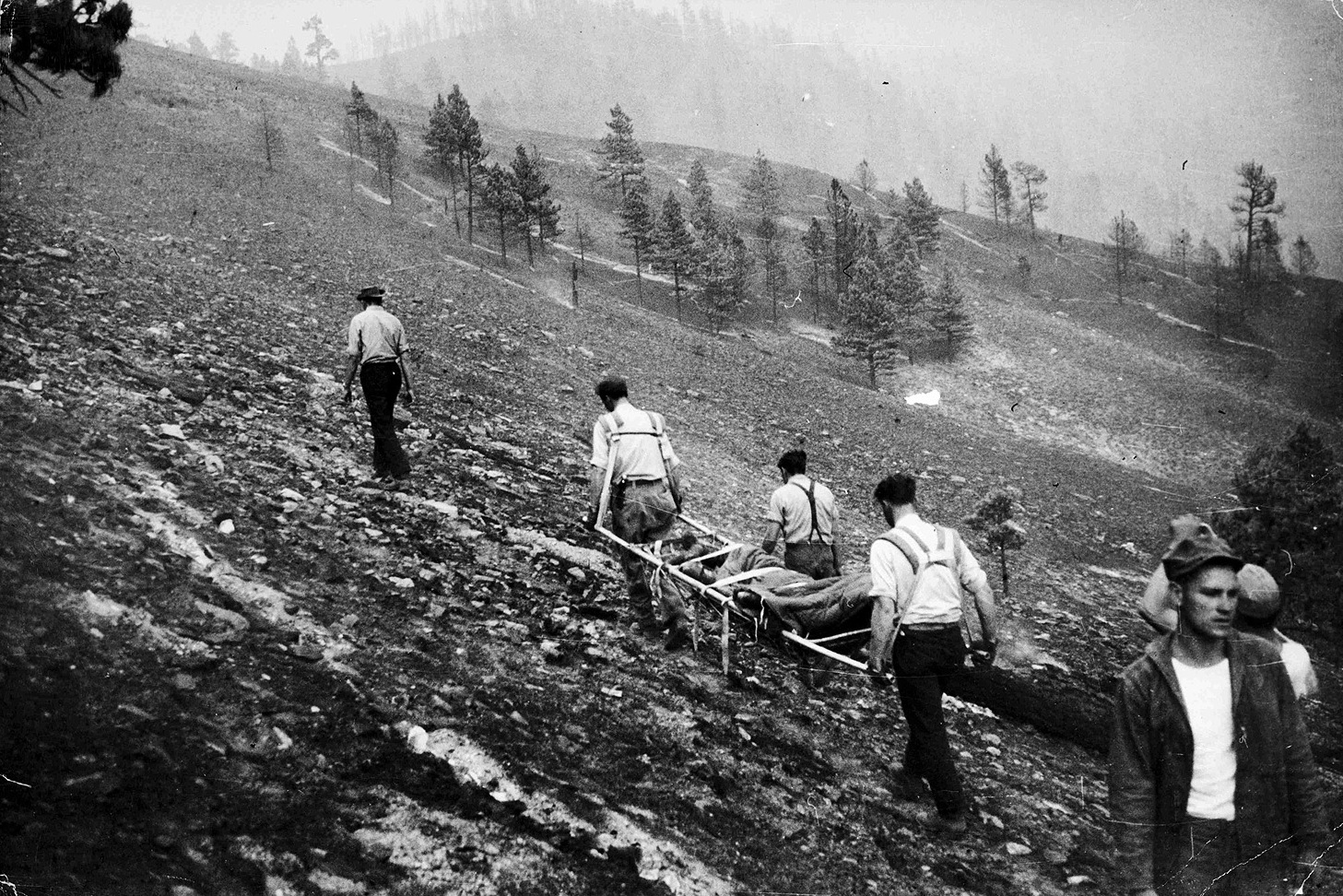
Retrieval of victims' remains on August 6, 1949, the day after the disaster.

In Young Men and Fire, Maclean stated that when the fire passed over Dodge's position, "he was lifted off the ground two or three times." Later researchers repeated the claim. However, this statement was an exaggeration. Dodge actually wrote, in his statement to the board of review, "There were three extreme gusts of hot air that almost lifted me from the ground as the fire passed over." In another description of Dodge's ordeal, John Maclean said, "as the main fire passed, it [the fire] picked him up and shook him like a dog with a bone." Young Men and Fire attributed the story to Earl Cooley, the spotter and kicker aboard the airplane, who had rebuffed Maclean's overture to collaborate and proceeded to publish his own book. But the mistaken story actually originated with C. E. "Mike" Hardy, who was the head of the litter bearers collecting the bodies the day after the disaster, and spoke with Dodge then as they sat on a log. Rothermel, in the early 1990s and Alexander in 2009 cite separate personal communications with Hardy asserting this account. Hardy assisted Norman Maclean in his research and accompanied him on a trip to the site.

Four-hundred-and-fifty men fought for five more days to get the fire under control, which had spread to 4,500 acres (1,800 ha).

== Timeline ==
The events described above all transpired in a relatively short period of time. Studies estimated that the fire covered 3,000 acres in 10 minutes during this blow-up stage, an hour and 45 minutes after the smokejumpers had arrived.

- 4:10 pm : All crew jumped.
- 5:00 pm :The scattered cargo had been gathered.
- 5:45 pm : The crew had seen the fire coming up towards them on the south-facing slope north of the stream and had turned to run.
- 5:55 pm: The fire had swept over them. The time at which the fire engulfed the men was judged by the melted hands on Harrison's pocket-watch, frozen at 5:56 pm by the intense heat.

== Casualties ==
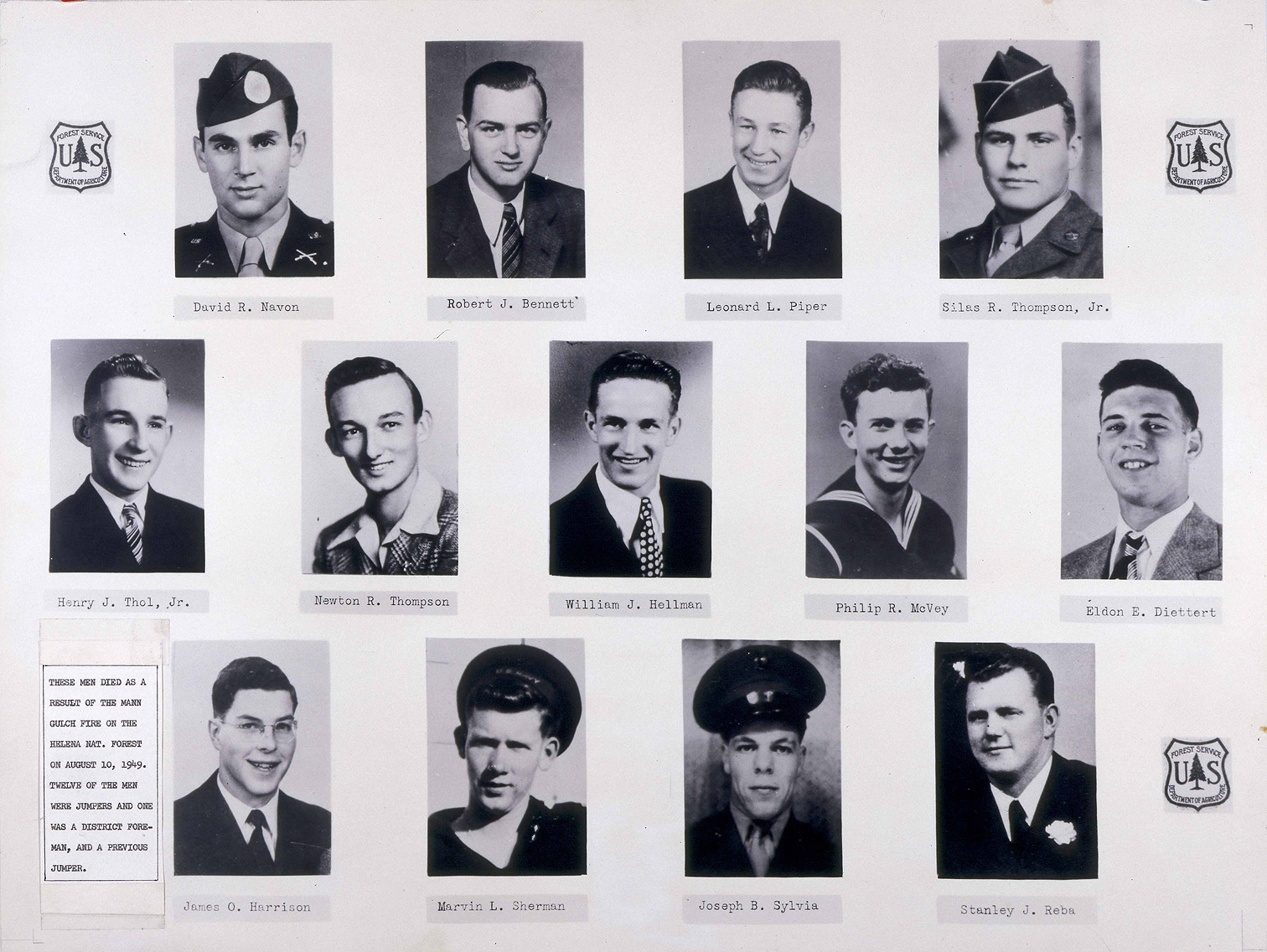
Memorial photos, 13 victims

Thirteen firefighters died, with eleven killed in the fire and two—Hellman and Sylvia—who sustained fatal burns and died later in the hospital. Only three of the sixteen survived.

Drs. Thomas L. Hawkins of Helena and R. S. Haines of Phoenix, Arizona were summoned at about 9:00 pm. The doctors stopped off at St. Peters Hospital to pick up blood plasma on the way to the disaster site. They arrived at the patients, both of whom had not yet been moved, and administered morphine and a quart (about 1 liter) of plasma to each— Hellman 12:45 am, Sylvia at 1:50, roughly 7 and 8 hours post-injury. Sylvia and Hellman finally arrived at the hospital in Helena around 10:00 and 10:30 am. Both died there before noon, 18 hours post-injury, of renal failure.

Medical understanding of severe burns was still in its infancy in 1949, having only shortly prior gained operational understanding from two mass-casualty fires, the Rialto fire in 1921 and Cocoanut Grove nightclub fire in 1942. The now widely used Parkland formula for fluid resuscitation calls for 4.0 ml of Ringer's Lactate per kg of body weight per % total body surface area; half of this volume is given in the first 8 hours and the rest in the next 16 hours. A 70 kg person with 70% TBSA would need nearly 10 liters within 8 hours of injury.

=== Smokejumpers ===
Those who were killed by the fire:

- Robert J. Bennett, age 22, from Paris, Tennessee
- Eldon E. Diettert, age 19, from Missoula, Montana, died on his 19th birthday
- James O. Harrison, Helena National Forest Fire Guard, age 20, from Missoula, Montana
- William J. Hellman, age 24, from Kalispell, Montana
- Philip R. McVey, age 22, from Babb, Montana
- David R. Navon, age 28, from Modesto, California
- Leonard L. Piper, age 23, from Blairsville, Pennsylvania
- Stanley J. Reba, age 25, from Brooklyn, New York
- Marvin L. Sherman, age 21, from Missoula, Montana
- Joseph B. Sylvia, age 24, from Plymouth, Massachusetts
- Henry J. Thol Jr., age 19, from Kalispell, Montana
- Newton R. Thompson, age 23, from Alhambra, California
- Silas R. Thompson, age 21, from Charlotte, North Carolina

Those who survived:

- R. Wagner (Wag) Dodge, Missoula SJ foreman, age 33 at the time of the fire. Dodge died five years after the fire from Hodgkin lymphoma.
- Walter B. Rumsey, age 21 at time of the fire, from Larned, Kansas. Rumsey died in an airplane crash in 1980, age 52.
- Robert W. Sallee, youngest man on the crew, age 17 at time of the fire, from Willow Creek, Montana. Last survivor of the smokejumpers; he died May 26, 2014, at age 82.

=== Additional individuals ===
Earl Cooley was the spotter/kicker (the airborne supervisor who directed the crew of smokejumpers who dropped in to fight the fire) the morning of the August 5, 1949 Mann Gulch fire jump. On July 12, 1940, as part of a two-man jump, Cooley had been the first ever smokejumper to jump on an operational fire jump. In the 1950s, Cooley served as the smokejumper base superintendent and was the first president of the National Smokejumper Association. He died November 9, 2009, at age 98.

== Controversy ==
Much controversy surrounded foreman Dodge and the fire he lit to escape. In answering the questions of the Forest Service Review Board as to why he took the actions he did, Dodge stated he had never had to use an escape fire before, and it was not explicitly taught; but he was trained to get into a burned area for safety and thus it seemed logical. Maclean incorrectly claimed that Dodge testified that "he had never heard of such a thing before." Similar escape fires had been used by the plains Indians against the fast-moving, brief-duration grass fires. The idea that Dodge devised the escape fire on the spot became popular in spite of contrary evidence. A contemporary of Dodge, Earl C. Schmidt (February 13, 1920 - November 5, 2014), recounted a 1943 discussion in which Dodge explained the use of the escape fire as a last resort. Schmidt's 1996 letter to Starr Jenkins opined that Dodge had calmly selected an area of least fuel and performed the maneuver "without flinching." Another of Dodge's contemporaries, James Arthur “Smokey” Alexander (1918–2014) said that setting escape fires was an "emergency exit procedure" that he had used in the 1930s. Alexander also said that he had discussed it with Dodge and others in 1941.

A few parents of the smokejumpers tried to sue the government with one charge that the "escape fire" had actually burned the men.

It was originally thought that the unburned patches underneath the bodies indicated they had suffocated for lack of air before the fire caught them. However, the unburned patches are called protected areas as their bodies shielded the underlying grass and forest litter from the intense thermal radiation, by keeping out hot gases, and absorbing heat. It is now known that death by smoke and toxic gas inhalation, while common in structure fires because of the confined atmosphere, is virtually nonexistent among wildland fire fatalities.

The unorthodox actions taken by foreman Dodge and the smokejumpers have also been analyzed by business management, organizational theory, and organizational communication scholars as well. Karl Weick, an American business scholar, largely conceptualized his theory of organizational sensemaking as a result of analyzing the Mann Gulch Incident. Specifically, Weick proposed that the smokejumpers survival hinged on a simultaneous breakdown of sensemaking (i.e., understanding the environment) and structure (organizational roles and hierarchy). Three key events led to this interrelated collapse:

- Change in leadership and collapse of organizational structure: When foreman Dodge left to scout the fire, he left Hellman in charge of the crew. Weick suggests that Hellman, who was responsible for "implementing orders" rather than "creating strategies" caused the smokejumpers to disregard his leadership and decision making during critical moments.
- Drop the tools: foreman Dodge's order for the crew to drop their tools was a defining moment of "sensebreaking" as the tools were both part of their identity and primary defense. Abandoning them broke both the rules of the job and contradicted their sense of safety and their occupational identity. Because the order was so counter-intuitive, doing so shifted the firefighters entire identity from professionals to "men running for their lives".
- Loss of legitimacy: Weick suggests that once the crew dropped their tools, foreman Dodge's subsequent commands had lost legitimacy and rather than be viewed as an authority in the chain of command, he was also just a panicked individual acting irrationally.

According to Weick, Dodge's suggestion to lay down in the ashes was viewed by the crew as a signal of desperation rather than a viable creative strategy. But Weick saw them as both, in part due to Dodge's ability to act unconventionally in the moment. Other scholars have expanded on Weick's ideas, proposing that Dodge's actions that day are the result of "expert craft practice." In moments of uncertainty, effective leaders are able to apply practical wisdom (what they have learned over the course of their career) with their ability to quickly make sense of a complex situation (appreciative inquiry), and improvise in the moment. In this case, Dodge understood how fire behaves based on his years of experience as a firefighter in the field, and was able to combine quick decision-making to arrive at an unconventional survival tactic, which ultimately saved his life. Sensemaking has since been applied to organizational leadership studies and case applications for other organizational contexts.

== Aftermath ==
Several months following the fire, fire scientist Harry Gisborne, from the U.S. Forest Service Research Center at Priest River, came to examine the damage. Despite a history of heart problems, he nevertheless conducted an on-ground survey of the fire site. He suffered a heart attack and died while finishing the day's research. Gisborne had forwarded theories as to the cause of the blowup prior to his arrival on site. Once there, he discovered several conditions, which caused him to change his concepts of fire activity, particularly those pertaining to fire "blow-ups". He noted this to his companion just before his death on November 9, 1949.

Lessons learned from the Mann Gulch fire had a significant effect on firefighter training. Two training protocols—"Ten Standard Firefighting Orders" and "Eighteen Situations That Shout Watch Out"—were incorporated into Forest Service firefighter training program, and safety training made mandatory to achieve certification to work on a fire line. However, the training methodology proved inadequate and the tragedy would be repeated twice: in the 1990 Dude fire in Arizona, which killed six firefighters, and in the 1994 South Canyon Fire in Colorado, in which 14 firefighters died. A primary factor in the latter appeared to be surprise of the sudden transition from surface fire to crown fire, leading to the development and adoption of LCES, an acronym for a four-point safety procedure to increase observance of the previous training protocols. LCES consists of posting lookouts, providing all firefighters radio communication with lookouts, identifying escape routes, and designating valid safety zones, and ensuring that all members of the process, from "hotshot" crews to seasonal Type 2 crew volunteers to "crew bosses", understand and follow its tenets.

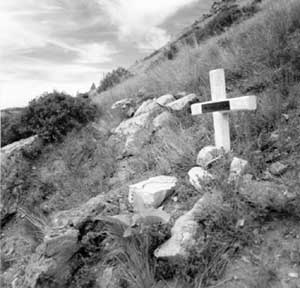
Memorial cross marking the spot where smokejumper Joseph B. Sylvia was fatally burned while fleeing the advancing wildfire. Thirteen memorial markers are located on the steep hillside.

An inquest by the Forest Service held hearings on Aug. 26–28, 1949, less than a month after the fatalities.

== Memorials ==
Thirteen crosses were erected to mark the locations where the thirteen firefighters who died fighting the Mann Gulch fire fell. However, one of the smokejumpers who died in the Mann Gulch fire was David Navon, who was Jewish. In 2001, the cross marking the location where Navon died was replaced with a marker bearing a Star of David.

"Miss Montana", the C-47/DC-3 that carried the smokejumpers that day, was later placed on exhibit in Missoula at the Museum of Mountain Flying. The aircraft was restored as a memorial to the smokejumpers and the fire guard who lost their lives at Mann Gulch on August 5, 1949. It was made airworthy and flown to France in 2019 as part of the D-Day 75th anniversary commemorations with a flight to Normandy. On August 5, 2019, "Miss Montana" flew back over Mann Gulch on the 70th anniversary of the fire and dropped wreaths for the 13 men lost.

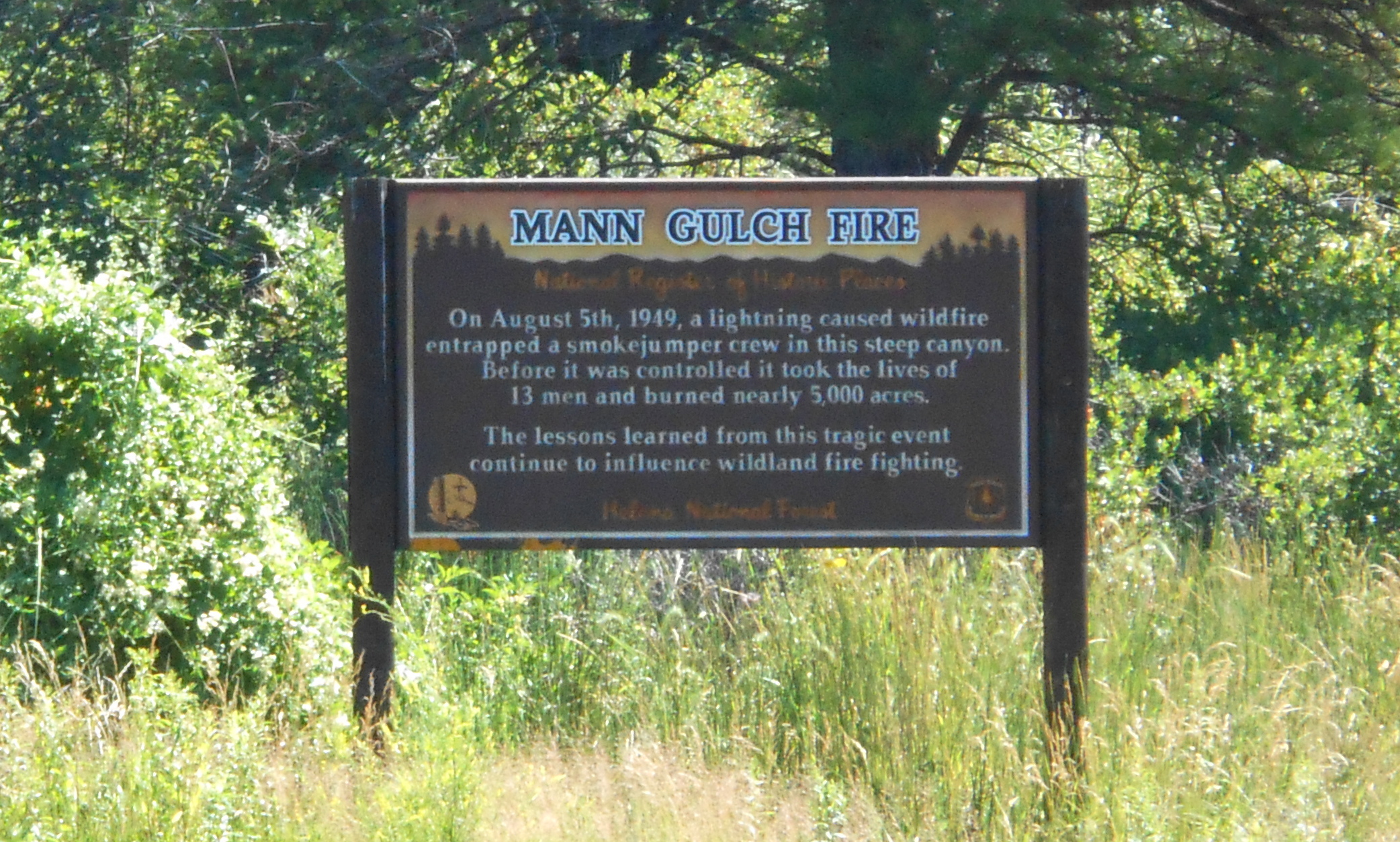
Commemorative sign at Mann Gulch, 2013.

== Depiction in media ==
=== Books ===
The fire was a topic in the prologue to Adam Grant's book Think Again: The Power of Knowing What You Don't Know (2021).

The Mann Gulch fire was the subject of Norman Maclean's book Young Men and Fire, which was published after his death. The book won the National Book Critics Circle Award for non-fiction in 1992.

Norman Maclean's son John N. Maclean wrote a book in 2003 titled Fire and Ashes: On the Front Lines Battling Wildfires, which also includes a section on the Mann Gulch fire. In 2004, he also published an article called "Fire and Ashes: The Last Survivor of the Mann Gulch Fire," in Montana: The Magazine of Western History. The article was adapted from the Mann Gulch section of his book, in which he interviewed Bob Sallee, the last remaining survivor of the fire.

=== Music ===
Folk singer James Keelaghan wrote a song about this fire entitled "Cold Missouri Waters", released on his 1995 album A Recent Future. Written from the perspective of foreman Dodge on his deathbed, the song describes "thirteen crosses high above the cold Missouri waters" and draws closely on other details from the events of the fire, describing Dodge as:

I gauged the fire, I'd seen bigger
So I ordered them to sidehill and we'd fight it from below
We'd have our backs to that river
We'd have it licked by morning even if we took it slow
But the fire crowned, it jumped the valley just ahead
There was no way down, we headed for the ridge instead
Too big to fight it, we'd have to fight that slope instead

Of his decision to set the escape fire, the song imagines Dodge saying:

I don't know why, I just thought it.
I struck a match to waist-high grass, running out of time.
Tried to tell them, "Step into this fire I set.
We can't make it, this is the only chance you'll get."
But they cursed me, ran for the rocks above instead.
I lay face down and prayed above the cold Missouri waters.

The song was revived as a tribute to the 19 firefighters who died in the massive Yarnell Hill Fire near Yarnell, Arizona, in 2013.

"Underneath Montana Skies", another song about the Mann Gulch fire, was written by Patrick Michael Karnahan of Black Irish Band, and is also on the album Into the Fire.

Ross Brown wrote a song entitled "The Mann Gulch," with a scratch version available on YouTube.

Levi Barrett released his song about the tragedy, "Mann Gulch Fire" in 2018.

=== Film ===
The 1952 movie Red Skies of Montana was loosely based on this incident.

== See also ==
- Wildfire
- Wildfire suppression
- Wildfire emergency management
- List of wildfires and wildfires in the United States
- Glossary of wildfire terms
- Fire investigation

== External resources ==
- Maclean, Norman (1992). Young men & fire. Chicago: University of Chicago Press. ISBN 978-0-226-50061-4. OCLC 25630633.
- Maclean, John (2004). Fire and ashes : on the front lines battling wildfire. New York: H. Holt. ISBN 978-0-8050-7591-5. OCLC 55531907.
- Matthews, Mark (2007). A great day to fight fire : Mann Gulch, 1949. Norman: University of Oklahoma Press. ISBN 978-0-8061-3857-2. OCLC 86115553. Archived from the original on November 30, 2007.
- Rothermel, Richard C. (May 1993). Mann Gulch Fire: A Race That Couldn't Be Won. United States Department of Agriculture, Forest Service, Intermountain Research Station, General Technical Report INT-GTR-299.
- Turner, Dave. (Spring 1999). "The Thirteenth Fire". Forest History Today.
- Weick, Karl E. (1993). "The Collapse of Sensemaking in Organizations: The Mann Gulch Disaster". Administrative Science Quarterly. 38 (4): 628–652. doi:10.2307/2393339. JSTOR 2393339.
- "August 5, 1949: Mann Gulch Tragedy". Peeling Back the Bark blog, the Forest History Society.
- Wildfire Lessons from Mann Gulch Fire
