= The Prairie (film) =

1947 film by Frank Wisbar

- Theatrical release poster
- Directed by: Frank Wisbar
- Written by: Arthur St. Claire
- Based on: the novel The Prairie by James Fenimore Cooper
- Produced by: Edward F. Finney
- Cinematography: James S. Brown Jr.
- Music by: Alexander Steinert
- Production company: Zenith Pictures
- Distributed by: Screen Guild Productions; Falcon Films
- Release date: November 27, 1957
- Running time: 65 minutes
- Country: United States
- Language: English
- Budget: $120,000 or $200,000

The Prairie is a 1947 American Western film based on the novel The Prairie by James Fenimore Cooper.

== Cast ==
- Lenore Aubert as Ellen Wade
- Alan Baxter as Paul Hover
- Russ Vincent as Abiram White
- Jack Mitchum as Asa Bush
- Charles Evans as Ishmael Bush
- Edna Holland as Esther Bush
- Chief Thundercloud as Eagle Feather
- Fred Coby as Abner Bush
- Bill Murphy as Jess Bush
- David Gerber as Gabe Bush
- Don Lynch as Enoch Bush
- George Morrell as Luke

== Production ==
The film was made by a new company, a co-operative venture between director Frank Wisbar, production manager Edward Finney and writer Arthur St Claire. They financed, cast and made the picture themselves. Reportedly Wisbar raised some finance from his family back in Germany.

It was shot at a new studios, the Motion Picture Center, over 12 days at an estimated $10,000 a day.

"This is an interesting, a desperate, attempt to break the deadlock on independent production", said Wisbar. "The other boys and I made up our minds to finance, cast and film a picture as well as it could be done, without interference from the "front office", distributors, or anyone else. We did this knowing a low budget can be – and usually is – the ruin of a good picture. I know. I've made them; bad ones."

Wisbar said they picked Cooper's novel because it was in the public domain and also "because it keeps the rootin', tootin', and shootin' to a minimum and stresses the human element, the story of a man who was a law unto himself. We wrote our script straight, cutting out every scene that was not absolutely necessary."

Wisbar said the film was made in a style that was "realistic but stylised. Camera treatment is modern in what I would call highly poetic."

The film marked the acting debut for Robert Mitchum's brother John.

== Reception ==
The Los Angeles Times said "I wish I could say the film makes some claim on artistry."

Associated Producers Inc announced a new version of the book would be filmed on 2 March 1959 but it appears to have not been made.
