= Harry Gisborne =

Harry Thomas Gisborne
- Harry Gisborne studying printouts of fire risk factors, Priest River Forest Research Station, Idaho, 1937.
- Born: September 11, 1893; Montpelier, Vermont
- Died: November 9, 1949 (aged 56); Mann Gulch, Montana
- Education: University of Michigan
- Known for: Wildfire research
- Scientific career
- Fields: Forestry
- Workplaces: United States Forest Service

Harry Thomas Gisborne (September 11, 1893 – November 9, 1949) was an American forester who pioneered the scientific study of wildfires.

== Biography ==
Harry Gisborne was born in Montpelier, Vermont. After graduating with a forestry degree from the University of Michigan, he joined the U.S. Forest Service, and after four years was assigned to head the Rocky Mountain Research Station in Missoula, Montana. Many of his studies were conducted at the Priest River Experimental Forest, just outside Priest River, Idaho. During his tenure there, he developed new instruments and methods to study the start and spread of wildfires. He was the first recipient from his area to receive the USDA Superior Service Award.

Gisborne died of a heart attack on November 9, 1949, while field-checking the site of the Mann Gulch Fire in August 1949. Norman Maclean called this the "death of a scientist" in his book Young Men and Fire.
