= Escape fire =

Wildfire suppression method

An escape fire is a fire lit to clear an area of vegetation in the face of an approaching wildfire when no escape exists. Approximately 40-percent of all wildfire deaths are caused by such fire entrapments, or what are sometimes called "burnovers".

== Description ==
Like a backfire, an escape fire works by depriving an approaching primary fire of fuel, so that when the primary fire reaches the point where the escape fire started the primary fire cannot continue, as there is nothing there to burn. In contrast, unlike a backfire, an escape fire does not attempt to control – let alone stop – a wildfire. Escape fires are an option in grassland but do not work in forest fires, because timber burns too slowly to consume the fuel before the main fire arrives.

== Notable examples ==
James Fenimore Cooper described the technique in his novel The Prairie (1827), but it became well-known only after the Mann Gulch fire of August 5, 1949, when (Robert Wagner) "Wag" Dodge came up with the same idea independently and successfully put it into practice. He used it to clear an area large enough for him to survive unharmed when the main fire was less than one minute away.

== See also ==
- Wildfire suppression
