= The Prairie =

1827 novel by James Fenimore Cooper

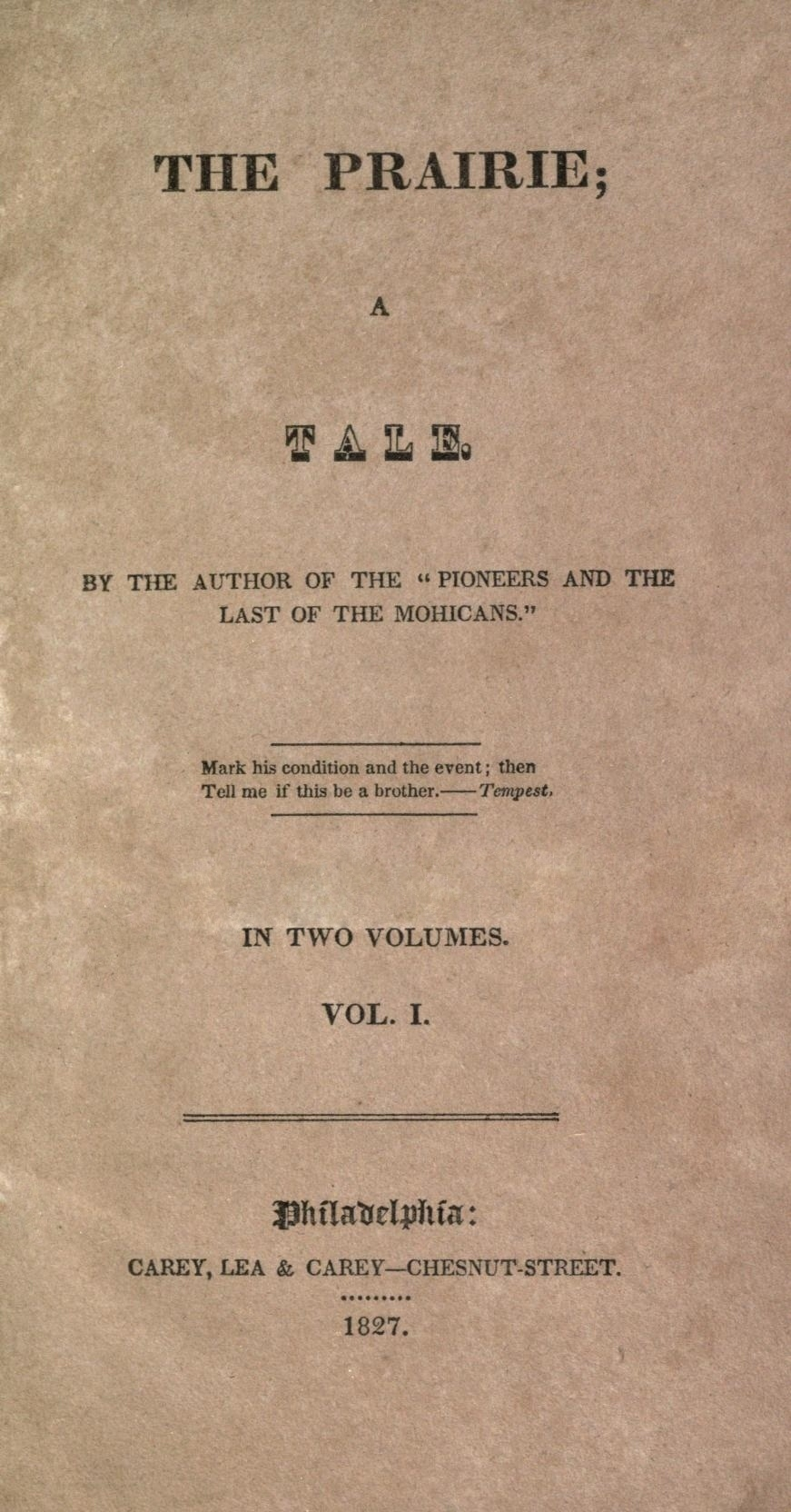
- First edition title page
- Author: James Fenimore Cooper
- Language: English
- Series: Leatherstocking Tales
- Genre: Adventure novel, Historical novel
- Publisher: Philadelphia: Carey, Lea & Carey—Chestnut-Street
- Publication date: 1827
- Publication place: United States
- Media type: Print (Hardback & Paperback)
- Pages: 528 pp in two volumes
- Preceded by: The Pioneers (novel)
- Followed by: Homeward Bound; or The Chase: A Tale of the Sea

The Prairie: A Tale is an 1827 novel by James Fenimore Cooper, the third novel written by him featuring Natty Bumppo. His fictitious frontier hero Bumppo is never called by his name, but is instead referred to as "the trapper" or "the old man". Chronologically The Prairie is the fifth and final installment of the Leatherstocking Tales, though it was published before The Pathfinder (1840) and The Deerslayer (1841). It depicts Natty in the final year of his life, still proving helpful to people in distress on the American frontier. The book frequently references characters and events from the two books previously published in the Leatherstocking Tales as well as the two which Cooper would not write for more than ten years. Continuity with The Last of the Mohicans is indicated by the appearance of the grandson of Duncan and Alice Heyward, as well as the noble Pawnee chief Hard Heart, whose name is English for the French nickname for the Delaware, le Coeur-dur.

== Characters ==
- The trapper – The story's main protagonist. Never mentioned by name, we infer by references to other books that this is Natty Bumppo in his 87th (or 83rd) and final year. He is the wise, cunning mind that keeps the white settlers alive through repeated, dangerous situations. Captain Duncan Middleton's grandparents were his close friends.
- Ishmael Bush – Rugged immigrant. Frequently described as dirty, lazy and coarse. Often referred to as a "squatter" because he lays claim to land without purchasing it from the government or the Indians. He is running from the law because he has aided in kidnapping Inez, Middleton's young wife.
- Esther Bush – Ishmael's hard, careworn wife, mother of his 14 children (seven sons and seven daughters). Sometimes a woman of action, sometimes a woman of quiet complaints.
- Ellen Wade – The niece of Esther's deceased first husband (husband's sister's daughter) who lives with them as their ward since she was orphaned. Ishmael intends to marry her to his eldest son Asa, but she is in love with Paul Hover.
- Abiram White – Esther Bush's brother. Kidnapper of Inez de Certavallos-Middleton before story begins. Murders his nephew Asa Bush, but isn't discovered until nearly the end of the book. The book's most base character.
- Inez de Certavallos-Middleton – The beautiful, petite bride of Captain Duncan Uncas Middleton, daughter of a wealthy landowner in Louisiana. A devout Catholic, determined to convert her husband to her faith.
- Captain Duncan Uncas Middleton – Grandson of Major Duncan Heyward and Alice Munro-Heyward of The Last of the Mohicans, who rescues his bride from Abiram White and sees to the proper burial of Natty Bumppo at the end of the narrative.
- Paul Hover – The country-wise, impetuous bee-hunter, who is betrothed to Ellen Wade. Nearly every comment he makes references bees in some fashion.
- Dr. Obed Bat Latinized as Battius – a physician-naturalist. He had joined himself to the Bush caravan as family physician, but he took the opportunity of going into the wilderness to make forays into the surrounding country to gather specimens of flora and fauna. Like the character of David the psalmodist in The Last of the Mohicans he both provides comic relief and a foil by which Cooper may compare the relative merits of Natty Bumppo's frontier practicality with theoretical knowledge. Obed and David are also similar to Hetty Hutter in The Deerslayer as people held in awe and unmolested by the Native Americans because of their mystical qualities as medicine men. When Obed learns of Inez and her circumstances, he joins her husband's party to rescue her. His speech is frequently didactic, often reciting a fictitious genus and species for each animal or plant he encounters.
- Asinus – Dr. Battius's trusty donkey, whose bray proves to be a life-saving measure for the doctor and his friends in the face of stampeding bison and hostile Native Americans.
- Hector – Natty's wise old hunting dog, who dies before Natty but is preserved through primitive taxidermy as a comfort to the dying frontiersman. His plaintive whine is the precursor of danger in the narrative. Middleton's dogs are related to Hector - descendants from a puppy that Natty sent as a gift to Middleton's grandfather years ago.
- Mahtoree – A brave and crafty Teton Sioux chief, who wants Ellen and Inez for his fourth and fifth wives. He is killed by Hard Heart.
- Hard Heart – A brave, handsome, and trustworthy Pawnee warrior, who helps Natty and Middleton escape from their enemies and manages an amazing escape from certain death at the hands of the Tetons. He leads the final battle against the Tetons, killing Mahtoree and taking his scalp for a prize. He becomes the husband of Tachechana, Mahtoree's beautiful widow, and protector and benefactor of her aged father, Le Balafré, and Natty Bumppo, who comes to love him like a son. His name links him to Natty's admired Delawares, whose nickname in French is le Coeur-dur, "hard heart." The trapper (Natty) is drawn to Hard Heart as a noble warrior in the likeness of his dear friend Uncas, The Last of the Mohicans.
- Weucha – A treacherous Teton brave, whom Hard Heart dramatically kills with his own tomahawk.
- Le Balafré – French for "the scarred one", so named by the French Canadian traders and soldiers, he is the very aged Teton father-in-law of Mahtoree, father of Tachechana, who as a character corresponds to Tamenund in The Last of the Mohicans.
- Tachechana – Youngest wife of Mahtoree.

== Plot ==
The story opens with Ishmael, his family, Ellen and Abiram slowly making their way across the virgin prairies of the Midwest looking for a homestead, just two years after the Louisiana Purchase, and during the time of the Lewis and Clark Expedition. They meet the trapper (Natty Bumppo), who has left his home in New York State to find a place where he cannot hear the sound of people cutting down the forests. In the years between his other adventures and this novel, he tells us only that he has walked all the way to the Pacific Ocean and seen all the land between the coasts (a heroic feat, considering Lewis and Clark hadn't yet completed the same trek).

That night, a band of Teton warriors steal all of Ishmael's animals, stranding the immigrants. The doctor returns the next morning along with his donkey. The trapper helps the family relocate their wagons, including one with mysterious contents, to a nearby butte where they will be safer when the Tetons return. Middleton joins the group when he stumbles upon the trapper and Paul. Before they return to the butte, Ishmael and his family go looking for his eldest son, Asa, whom they find murdered.

The trapper, Paul, and Middleton return to camp, find Inez whom Abiram and Ishmael had been keeping captive, and flee with her and Ellen. Ishmael chases them until the Tetons capture the Trapper and his crew. They escape the Tetons, and then Ishmael forms an alliance with the Indians. The Indians attempt to recapture the trapper by surrounding them with a prairie fire, but the trapper lights a backfire and saves everyone. They meet up with Hard-heart, a Pawnee Indian who survived the fire wrapped in a buffalo skin, and attempt to escape to his village. The Tetons capture them. Ishmael demands the trapper, Inez, and Ellen for helping the Tetons but is denied and turned away. Mahtoree intends to take Inez and Ellen for his new wives. Le Balafre attempts to spare Hard-heart's life by making Hard-heart his son. Hard-heart refuses, kills Weucha, and flees the village.

When Hard-heart's Pawnee warriors attack the Teton village, the trapper and his friends escape, only to be captured by Ishmael. The trapper is accused of Asa's death until Abiram's guilt is discovered. Abiram is executed, and Ishmael's family returns east without Inez, Ellen, or the doctor. Middleton, Inez, Paul, and Ellen travel back to Louisiana and Kentucky, respectively, while the trapper joins a Pawnee village located on a tributary of the Missouri River. Middleton and Paul return just in time to witness the trapper's noble death and bury him.

== Westward expansion as American archetype ==
In the spirit of Daniel Boone, who is said to have thought "a population of ten to the square mile inconveniently crowded," The Prairie incorporates the historical phenomenon of the migration of settlers into the territories of the Louisiana Purchase. "The trapper" exemplifies frontiersmen like Daniel Boone in his quest for the wide open spaces of the American west. The Ishmael Bush party is an early wagon train. Novelist and social critic James Fenimore Cooper (1789–1851) was the first major American writer to deal imaginatively with American life, notably in his five Leatherstocking Tales. He was also a critic of the political, social, and religious problems of the day.

James Cooper (his mother's family name of Fenimore was legally added in 1826) was born in Burlington, N.J., on Sept. 15, 1789, the eleventh of 12 children of William Cooper, a pioneering landowner and developer in New Jersey and New York. When James was 14 months old, his father moved the family to a vast tract of wilderness at the headwaters of the Susquehanna River in New York State where, on a system of small land grants, he had established the village of Cooperstown at the foot of Otsego Lake.

Here, in the "Manor House", later known as Otsego Hall, Cooper grew up, the privileged son of the "squire" of a primitive community.

== Treatment of Native Americans ==
As with The Last of the Mohicans, one of Cooper's major themes in The Prairie is the idea of a noble savage. The book contrasts Hard-heart and the Pawnee tribe—who were at peace with the white settlers—to the warlike Tetons. The Tetons are categorically described as cunning, crafty, deceitful, loathsome and dirty. Hard-heart is brave, fierce, and fights to protect his honor. He refuses to abandon his tribe, even if he loses his life for it. In contrast, Le Balafre once abandoned his tribe to become a Teton, thus saving his own life. In the end, Hard-heart is alive while Weucha and Mahtoree are dead.

The doctor, horrified at the possibility of being forced to marry an Indian wife, refers to them as a different species, not homo sapiens.

The Tetons are frequently referred to as looking like snakes or with other snake symbolism, such as having "forked tongues".

Although Cooper's Indians are frequently stereotypical, so are his white characters. Despite sometimes referring prejudicially to Indians as subhuman, he still presents them in a complex light, a mixture of human and devilish characteristics. Amidst what Cooper describes as primitive or dirty, he lauds their honor, hospitality, laws, etc. The Indians are more complex characters than most or any of the white characters in the book. In The Prairie, the Tetons are the most loathsome, evil characters aside from Abiram, and yet Hard-heart of the Pawnee is the most honorable and brave character after the trapper.

== Adaptation ==
=== Film ===
- 1947: The Prairie.

=== TV ===
- 1969: The Leatherstocking Tales Part 4 - The Prairie (Die Lederstrumpferzählungen Tail 1 - Die Prärie). 4 parts Germany-France series (https://de.wikipedia.org/wiki/Die_Lederstrumpferz%C3%A4hlungen).
