= Fire-adapted communities =

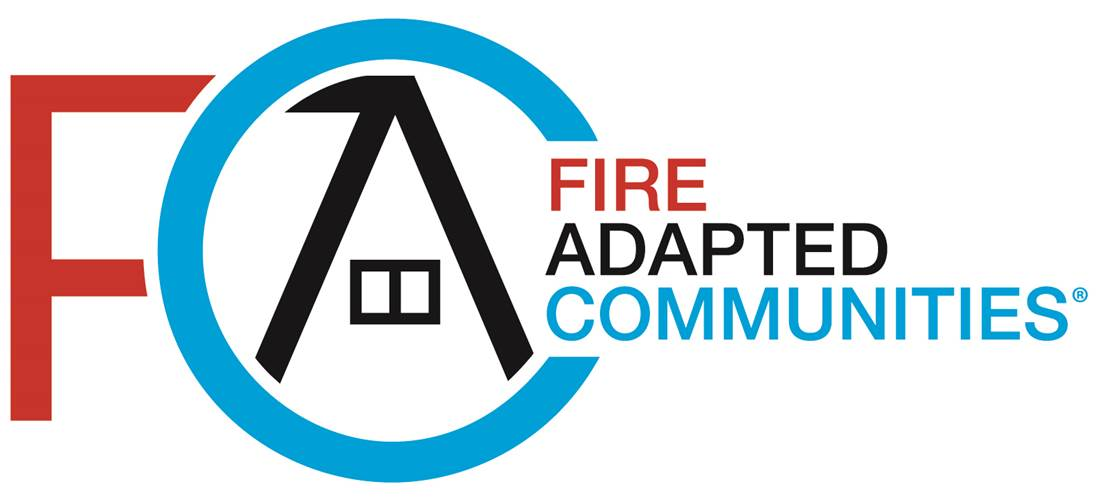
Fire Adapted Communities logo

A fire-adapted community is defined by the United States Forest Service as "a knowledgeable and engaged community in which the awareness and actions of residents regarding infrastructure, buildings, landscaping, and the surrounding ecosystem lessens the need for extensive protection actions and enables the community to safely accept fire as a part of the surrounding landscape."

The National Wildfire Coordinating Group definition, which was developed and approved by the Wildland Urban Interface Mitigation Committee, is "A human community consisting of informed and prepared citizens collaboratively planning and taking action to safely co-exist with wildland fire."

== Elements ==
According to a United States Forest Service briefing paper the following are some of the elements of a fire adapted community:

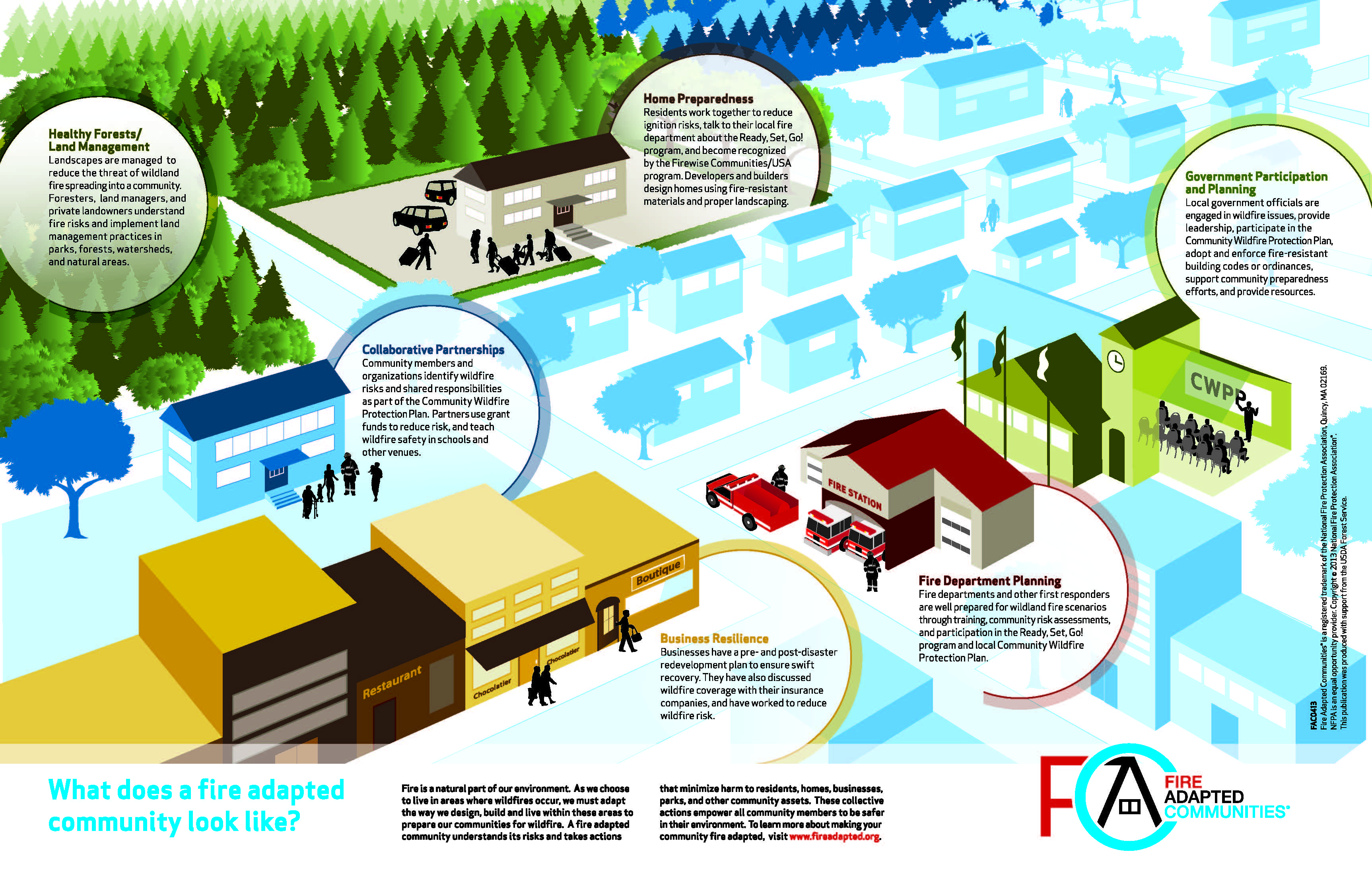
What does a fire adapted community look like?

The public understands:

- the role of fire on the surrounding landscape
- fire authorities may not save all homes
- community mitigation actions reduce the impacts of wildfire

The community takes actions to:

- create a collaborative group to develop a CWPP
- develop and maintain a mitigation education program including prevention
- support and enhance local fire protection capacity (RSG!)
- prepare structures for wildfire via Firewise, Living With Fire or similar principles
- build with fire resistant materials and site structures in low risk landscapes
- develop evacuation plans
- create safety zones in the community and fuel buffers at its edge
- use codes and ordinances if applicable
- work with public and private landowners to treat hazardous fuels
- maintain cooperative agreements with partners
- increase and maintain risk reduction efforts over time.

== Fire Adapted Communities Coalition Resources ==
The Fire Adapted Communities Coalition is a group of partners committed to helping people and communities in the wildland-urban interface adapt to living with wildfire and reduce their risk for damage, without compromising firefighter or civilian safety. See External Links below for Coalition resources.

== Quadrennial Fire Review ==
The term has existed for a number of years, but was given prominence in the 2005 “Quadrennial Fire and Fuel Review (QFR),” a publication that examines the future of wildfire in the United States and provides insight and predictions about potential changes in mission, roles and responsibilities. The 2005 QFR suggested promoting “fire-adapted human communities, rather than escalating protection of communities at risk in the wildland-urban interface.” The ultimate aim would build toward the goal of a greater “sense of living with fire within communities,” and “establishing responsible partnerships with communities.”

The 2009 QFR also says the notion that “the government will always be there” (p. 32, 2009 QFR) during a wildfire needs to be changed to a model where property owners and local agencies “take responsibility and become active participants and an integral part” in curbing the effects of wildfire to communities. (p. 21, 2009 QFR.) “As some ecosystems must adapt to a fire-prone environment in order to survive, so must human communities in the interface, if they are to survive over the long-term.”

The 2009 QFR further examined the characteristics of fire-adapted communities. “The premise is that all partners recognize a general set of common operating precepts: namely, fulfilling pre-fire mitigation, defensible space, and individual responsibilities, applicable regulations; and providing a robust local response capacity … Other key steps include building community defensible space or fuels reduction zones … as an essential component of a larger integrated fuels management portfolio …”

== Reducing risks ==
Achieving fire-adapted communities is an approach that concentrates on plans and activities that reduce risk before a wildfire occurs. It does not rely on government agencies, through suppression activities, to protect communities after a wildfire starts. While a precise definition may not exist, a fire-adapted community has a combination or mixture of similar characteristics:

1. The community exists within or adjacent to a fire-prone ecosystem and has a defined geographic boundary.
2. Residents possess the knowledge, skills, and willingness to properly prepare their homes before a wildfire threatens, prepare to evacuate, and safely evacuate when necessary.
3. Local fire suppression forces have the adequate skills, equipment and capacity to manage wildfire.
4. Residents and the local fire agencies have met and understood the local fire suppression capability and related fire-response expectations.
5. Landowners are aware of fuel threats on their property and have taken action to mitigate the danger.
6. Structures and landscaping are designed, constructed, retrofitted, and maintained in a manner that is ignition-resistant.
7. A community wildfire protection plan is developed and implemented.
8. The community has embraced the need for defensible space by creating fuel reduction zones and internal safety zones, where treatments have been properly spaced, sequenced, and maintained over the long term.
9. Local government has effective land use planning and regulation, including building codes and local ordinances.
10. Property owners have an understanding of their responsibilities before, during and after a fire.
11. Public expectations are realistic and not based on reliance of government to provide all answers. Individuals accept personal responsibility for their property. The public understands that fire authorities cannot provide protection for every structure affected during a wildfire; and understands that it is dangerous for firefighters to attempt to protect a structure where owners have not taken the appropriate measures to make it defensible.

== Partnerships ==
The role of partnerships in achieving fire-adapted communities was explained by Vicky Christiansen, the Arizona state forester, to a congressional subcommittee. Representing the National Association of State Foresters, she testified, “Our work builds on the vision that effective partnerships, with shared responsibility held by all stakeholders of the wildland fire problem, will create well-prepared, fire-adapted communities and healthy, resilient landscapes.”

Pam Leschak, wildland-urban interface program manager for the USDA Forest Service, compared the overall efforts of fire-adapted communities to an umbrella. “Think of fire-adapted communities as an umbrella under which exist the goals, the elements, the programs and tools, the partnerships and the processes needed to enable communities to reduce risk from wildfire. Partners at every level joining forces, before a wildfire starts, to use existing and new … tools to creative fire-adaptive communities, which have taken the necessary actions to safely survive a wildfire with little or no additional structural protection resources while sustaining little or no damage.” (Pam Leschak, USDA Forest Service, “Strong Partnerships and the Right Tools: The Pre-wildfire Strategy of Fire-adapted Communities,” Institute for Business and Home Safety magazine, “Disaster Review,” March 2010, p. XX)

== Washoe County, Nevada ==
In 2009, University of Nevada Cooperative Extension's Living With Fire program received funding from the Nevada Division of Forestry and USDA Forest Service to bring the concept of Fire Adapted Communities to five of Washoe County's high and extreme fire hazard neighborhoods. The project collaborators (federal, state, and local firefighting agencies, Nevada Fire Safe Council, and others) identified and described five key elements of a fire adapted community that homeowners should be aware of:

1. Community protection
2. Access
3. Built environment
4. Defensible space
5. Evacuation

This information was then presented to residents of the five targeted communities at workshops and through newsletters, direct mail pieces, an exhibit and through a publication titled, Fire Adapted Communities: The Next Step in Wildfire Preparedness.
