= Air Wisconsin Flight 965 =

1980 plane crash in Nebraska, U.S.

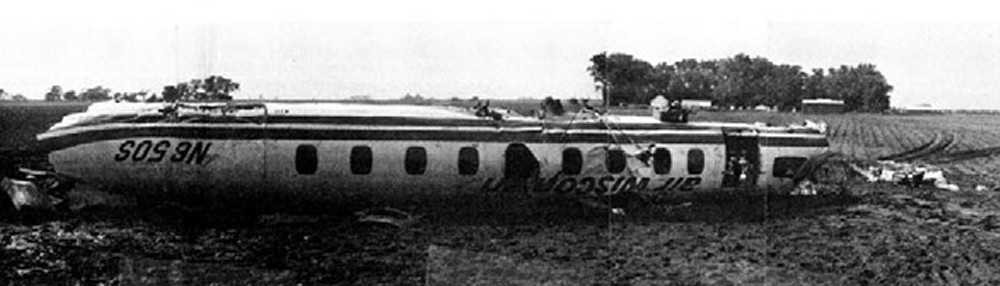
- NTSB photo of Air Wisconsin flight 965 wreckage

Accident
- Date: June 12, 1980
- Summary: Loss of control after double engine flame-out
- Site: Douglas County, 5 km (3.1 mi; 2.7 nmi) North of Valley, Nebraska, United States; 41°22′55″N 96°20′42″W

Aircraft
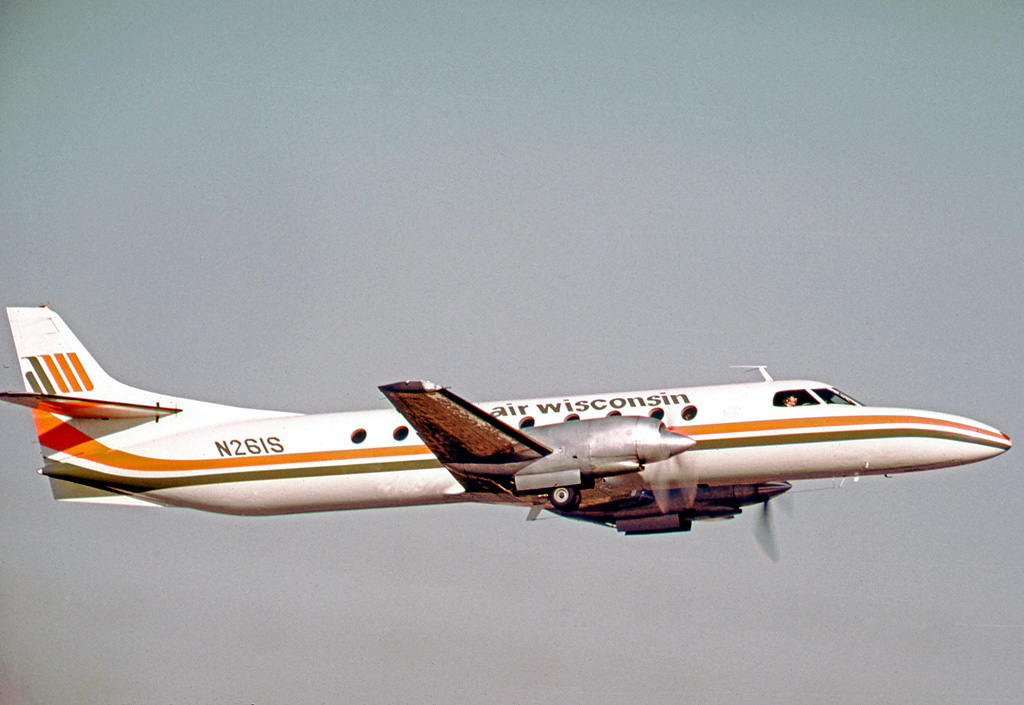
- A Swearingen SA-226TC Metro II, similar to the accident aircraft
- Aircraft type: Swearingen SA226-TC Metro II
- Operator: Air Wisconsin
- Call sign: WISCONSIN 965
- Registration: N650S
- Flight origin: Outagamie County Regional Airport (ATW/KATW) near Greenville, Wisconsin
- Stopover: Minneapolis-St. Paul International Airport (MSP/KMSP)
- Destination: Lincoln Municipal Airport (LNK/KLNK)
- Occupants: 15
- Passengers: 13
- Crew: 2
- Fatalities: 13
- Injuries: 2
- Survivors: 2

Air Wisconsin Flight 965 (registration N650S) was a flight operated by Air Wisconsin that crashed near Valley, Nebraska, on June 12, 1980. The crash was caused by poor weather conditions making the engines fail and failure to recontrol the aircraft.

== Accident ==
The aircraft operating Flight 965, a Swearingen SA226-TC Metro II, left Outagamie County Regional Airport on a one-stop flight to Lincoln Municipal Airport at 12:45 on June 12, 1980. The flight stopped at Minneapolis-St. Paul International Airport and then continued on to Lincoln Municipal Airport.

While en route but nearing its destination the aircraft experienced severe turbulence and was cleared to successively lower altitudes in an attempt to avoid the turbulence. During the descent the aircraft entered a region of severe precipitation, which caused both engines to flame-out due to very high levels of water ingestion. The crew managed to re-light both engines but lost control and impacted the ground. The aircraft struck the ground in a slightly nose down and right wing low attitude, bounced and then struck the ground a second time, sliding along the ground coming to a rest inverted. Both crew members and eleven of the thirteen passengers were killed in the accident. One of the thirteen passengers killed was Walter Rumsey, a smokejumper that survived the 1949 Mann Gulch fire in Montana that killed thirteen smokejumpers.

== Background ==
=== Aircraft ===
The accident aircraft, SA-226TC Metro II c/n TC-228, had flown a total of 8,055 hours and had first flown in 1976. There were no failures of the aircraft or its systems reported before the crash, or discovered by the investigation team.

=== Crew ===
The captain was 37-year-old Peter A. Grab, who had been with Air Wisconsin since 1972. He had 8,391 flight hours, including 6,000 hours on the SA-226TC Metro. The first officer was 28-year-old Nicholas Gallmeister, who had joined the airline three months before the accident and had logged 4,063 flight hours, but only 143 of them were on the SA-226TC Metro.

== Investigation ==
The investigation focused on why the aircraft was flown deliberately into a region of very extreme weather, without air traffic control informing the crew of the weather or the on-board weather detection system indicating the extreme weather.

The direct cause of the crash was determined as flight into extreme weather causing the engines to flame-out and failure to maintain control during the recovery. Contributory causes were the failure of air traffic services to warn of the extreme weather and the inability of the aircraft's weather radar to penetrate even moderate precipitation, leaving the crew unaware of the extreme precipitation in the weather ahead.

== See also ==
- Southern Airways Flight 242
- TACA Flight 110
