= Wildland–urban interface =

Transition zone between wilderness and developed land

The wildland–urban interface (WUI, pronounced “woo-ee”) is a zone of transition between wilderness (unoccupied land) and land developed by human activity – an area where a built environment meets or intermingles with a natural environment. Human settlements in the WUI are at a greater risk of catastrophic wildfire.

The wildland-urban interface poses challenges to public health, causes environmental impacts, and facilitates the transmission of zoonotic diseases.

== Definitions ==
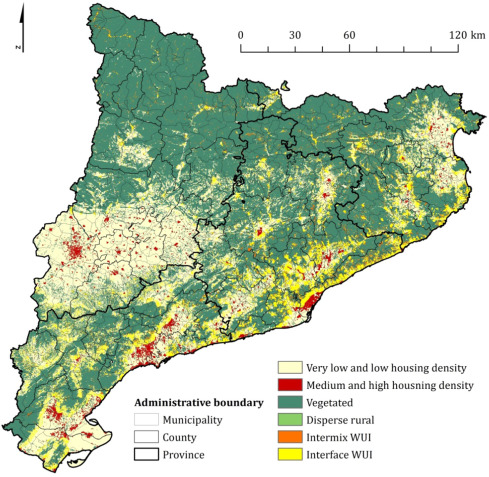
Map of the wildland–urban interface in Catalonia featuring intermix and interface zones

In the United States, the wildland–urban interface (WUI) has two definitions. The US Forest Service defines the wildland–urban interface qualitatively as a place where "humans and their development meet or intermix with wildland fuel." Communities that are within 0.5 miles (0.80 km) of the zone are included. A quantitative definition is provided by the Federal Register, which defines WUI areas as those containing at least one housing unit per 40 acres (16 ha).

The Federal Register definition splits the WUI into two categories based on vegetation density:

- Intermix WUI, or lands that contain at least one housing unit per 40 acres (16 ha) in which vegetation occupies more than 50% of terrestrial area; a heavily vegetated intermix WUI is as an area in which vegetation occupies over 75% of terrestrial area (at least 5 km^{2}).
- Interface WUI, or lands that contain at least one housing unit per 40 acres (16 ha) in which vegetation occupies less than 50% of terrestrial area (at least 2.4 km^{2}).

== NIST classification ==
In 2022 the U.S. National Institute of Standards and Technology, working with CAL FIRE and the Insurance Institute for Business & Home Safety, published a Hazard Mitigation Methodology (HMM) that refines how the wildland–urban interface is described.

The report argues that Structure-Separation Distance (SSD) is the dominant control on parcel-to-parcel fire spread, and therefore on the level of hardening that is needed for both existing and new construction.

The methodology recognises seven WUI types that fall into three broad density bands:

- High-density interface (Types 1 & 2). Here typical SSDs are below 30 ft (9.1 m), and most parcels are smaller than half an acre. Type 1 describes the ribbon of homes that directly borders wildland vegetation, while Type 2 covers the interior of the same development. Post-fire studies at Coffey Park in Santa Rosa and in the Mountain Shadows neighbourhood of Colorado Springs illustrate the high exposure that can arise when homes are separated by as little as 6 ft (1.8 m).
- Medium-density interface and intermix (Types 3–5). These areas have SSDs ranging from about 30 to 100 ft (9.1 to 30.5 m) and parcel sizes that commonly exceed one-half acre. Types 3 and 4 divide an interface community into its perimeter and interior bands, whereas Type 5 applies where houses are intermingled with continuous wildland fuels. At this spacing, sheds, fences and other "auxiliary fuels" become important pathways for fire propagation and are a focus of the HMM retrofit guidance.
- Low-density interface and intermix (Types 6 & 7). In these settings buildings are typically more than 100 ft (30 m) apart and sit on lots of at least one acre. Type 6 refers to parcels on the wildland edge, while Type 7 covers scattered development embedded within vegetation. Although structure-to-structure ignition is less likely, the methodology notes that long driveways, limited water supply and delayed response times create distinct evacuation and suppression challenges.

Because the scheme is anchored in measurable SSD, it links regional "interface / intermix" mapping with parcel-scale decisions. The note shows, for example, that when two buildings lie within about 25 ft (7.6 m) of one another, directional hardening of walls, eaves and attached decks becomes critical, whereas wider separations allow fuel-management efforts to concentrate on the surrounding parcel.

The HMM classification complements earlier Federal Register and Fire Hazard Severity Zone definitions by connecting broad land-use categories to the detailed mitigation actions needed to reduce structure losses in contemporary WUI fires.

== Growth ==
Human development has increasingly encroached into the wildland–urban interface.

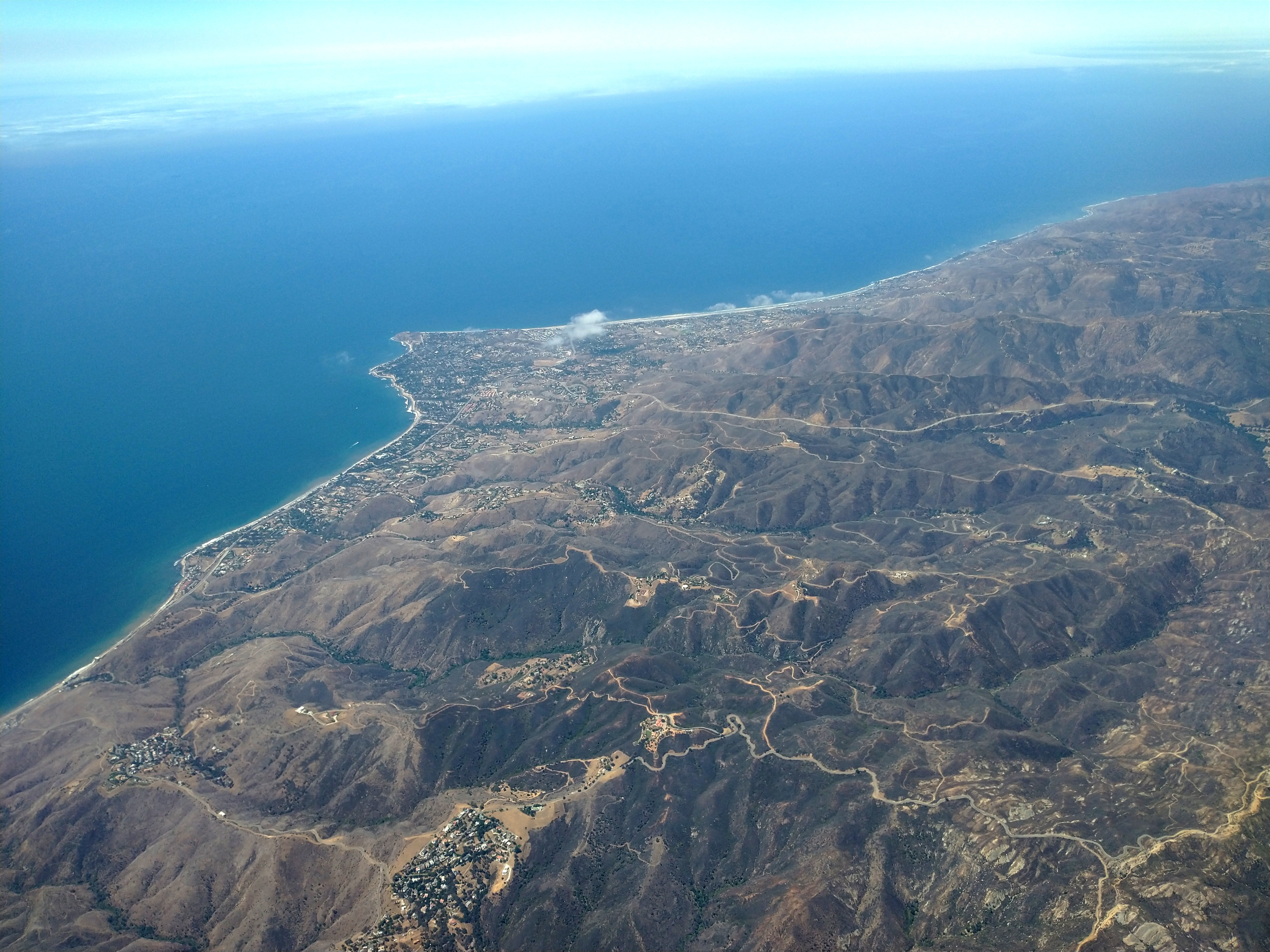
Malibu, California aerial view in July 2021 showing residential development deep in the mountains. Note previously burned area (darker areas) on mountains.

=== Population shifts ===
The WUI was the fastest-growing land use type in the United States between 1990 and 2010. Factors include geographic population shifts, expansion of cities and suburbs into wildlands, and vegetative growth into formerly unvegetated land. The primary cause has been migration. Of new WUI areas, 97% were the result of new housing. In the United States there are population shifts towards the WUIs in the West and South; increasing nationally by 18 percent per decade, covering 6 million additional homes between 1990 and 2000 which in 2013 was 32 percent of habitable structures. Globally, WUI growth includes regions such as Argentina, France, South Africa, Australia, and regions around the Mediterranean sea. Going forward it is expected the WUI will continue to expand; an anticipated amenity-seeking migration of retiring baby-boomers to smaller communities with lower costs of living close to scenic and recreational natural resources will contribute to WUI growth. Climate change is also driving population shifts into the WUI as well as changes in wildlife composition.

=== Ecological effects ===
Housing growth in WUI regions can displace and fragment native vegetation. The introduction of non-native species by humans through landscaping can change the wildlife composition of interface regions. Pets can kill large quantities of wildlife.

Forest fragmentation is another impact of WUI growth, which can lead to unintended ecological consequences. For instance, increased forest fragmentation can lead to an increase in the prevalence of Lyme disease. White-footed mice, a primary host of the Lyme tick, thrive in fragmented habitats.

Increased urbanisation has a variety of effects on plant life. Depending on the influences that are present, some plant traits like woodiness and height may increase while many other traits either show mixed responses or are not well studied.

Additionally, disease vectors in isolated patches can undergo genetic differentiation, increasing their survivability as a whole.

Increases in wildfire risk pose a threat to conservation in WUI growth regions.

Ecological change driven by human influence and climate change has often resulted in more arid and fire-prone WUI. Factors include climate change driven vegetation growth and introduction of non-native plants, insects, and plant diseases.

In North America, Chile, and Australia, unnaturally high fire frequencies due to exotic annual grasses have led to the loss of native shrublands.

=== Impact on Human Health ===
There are several public health risks associated with human populations at the wildland-urban interface beyond exposure to wildfires. Exposure to smoke from wildfires have considerable health impacts on respiratory and cardiovascular morbidity in vulnerable populations

=== One Health and Zoonotic Disease Transmission ===
The proximity of animals serving as zoonotic disease hosts and humans places human populations at high risk of disease transmission, with 20% of humans living in WUI areas with “high zoonotic potential.” Increased movement into WUI zones places humans at increased risk of zoonoses. The One Health approach, which focuses on the intersection of human, animal, and environmental health, enables monitoring, evaluating appropriate land use, and facilitating interdisciplinary public health approaches to mitigate risks associated with WUI.

== Fire ==
Human development has increasingly encroached into the wildland–urban interface. Coupled with a recent increase in large wildland fires, this has led to an increase in fire protection costs. Between 1985–1994 and 2005–2014, the area burned by wildfires in the United States nearly doubled from 18,000 to 33,000 square kilometers. Wildfires in the United States exceeding 50,000 acres (20,000 ha) have steadily increased since 1983; the bulk in modern history occurred after 2003. In the United States, from 1985 to 2016, federal wildfire suppression expenditures tripled from $0.4 billion per year to $1.4 billion per year.

Evacuations in WUI regions could be complex due to densely populated communities, limited road networks, and varying levels of preparedness and risk perception among residents can lead to congestion, delays, and unsafe evacuation routes. The diverse demographics in these areas —ranging from elderly populations to young families— require tailored evacuation strategies to accommodate different vulnerabilities and safety needs. Effective WUI evacuation planning must balance early warning systems, clear communication, adequate infrastructure, and community engagement to enhance preparedness and ensure rapid, safe responses in emergencies.

=== Wildfire risk assessment ===
Calculating the risk posed to a structure located within a WUI is through predictive factors and simulations. Identifying risk factors and simulation with those factors help to understand and then manage the wildfire threat.

For example, a proximity factor measures the risk of fire from wind carried embers which can ignite new spot fires over a mile ahead of a flame front. A vegetation factor measures the risk those wind carried embers have of starting a fire; lower vegetation has a lower risk.

A quantitative risk assessment simulation combines wildfire threat categories. Areas at the highest risk are those where a moderate population overlaps or is adjacent to a wildland that can support a large and intense wildfire and is vulnerable with limited evacuation routes.

==== Risk factors ====
The Calkin framework predicts a catastrophic wildfire in the Wildland–urban Interface (WUI), with three categories of factors. These factors allow for an assessment of a degree of wildfire threat. These are ecological factors that define force, human factors that define ignition, and vulnerability factors that define damage. These factors are typically viewed in a geospatial relationship.

The ecological factor category includes climate, seasonal weather patterns, geographical distributions of vegetation, historical spatial wildfire data, and geographic features. The ecological determines wildfire size and intensity.

The human factor category includes arrangement and density of housing. Density correlates with wildfire risk for two reasons. First, people cause fires; from 2001 to 2011, people caused 85% of wildfires recorded by the National Interagency Fire Center (NIFC). Second, housing intensifies wildfires because they contain flammable material and produce mobile embers, such as wood shakes. The relationship between population density and wildfire risk is non-linear. At low population densities, human ignitions are low. Ignitions increase with population density. However, there is a threshold of population density at which fire occurrence decreases. This is true for a range of environments in North America, the Mediterranean Basin, Chile, and South Africa. Possible reasons for a decrease include decreases in open space for ember transmission, fuel fragmentation due to urban development, and higher availability of fire-suppression resources. Areas with moderate population densities tend to exhibit higher wildfire risk than areas with low or high population densities.

The vulnerability factor category is measured with evacuation time through a proximity of habitable structures to roads, matching of administrators to responsibilities, land use, building standards, and landscaping types.

==== Risk simulations ====
Wildfire spread is commonly simulated with a Minimum Travel Time (MTT) algorithm.

Prior to MTT algorithms, fire boundaries were modeled through an application of Huygens' principle; boundaries are treated as wave fronts on a two-dimensional surface.

Minimum Travel Time (MTT) methods build on Huygens' principle to find a minimum time for fire to travel between two points. MTT assumes nearly-constant factors such as environmental factors for wind direction and fuel moisture. The MTT is advantageous over Huygens in scalability and algorithm speed. However, factors are dynamic and a constant representation comes at a cost of a limited window and thus MTT is only applicable to short-timescale simulations.

=== Risk management ===
Structure and vegetation flammability is reduced through community-focused risk management through reduction of community vulnerabilities. The degree of control of vulnerability to wildfires is measured with metrics for responsibilities and zones of defenses.

==== Reducing risk through responsibility distribution ====
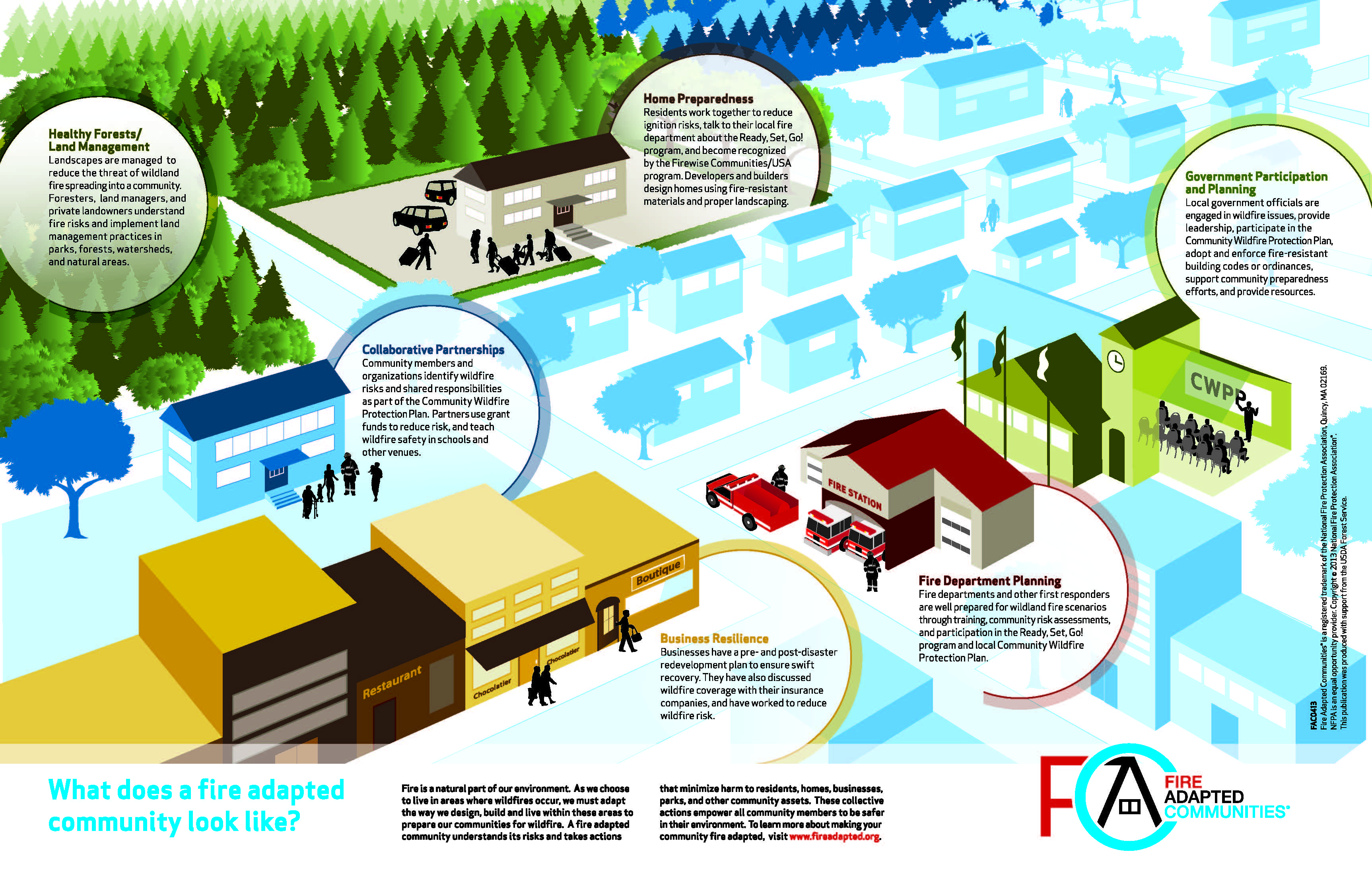
By distributing wildfire management responsibilities, communities can mitigate risks.

The probability of catastrophic WUI wildfire is controlled by assignment of responsibility for three actionable WUI objectives: controlling potential wildfire intensity, reducing ignition sources, and reducing vulnerability. When these objectives are met, then a community is a fire-adapted community. The U.S. Forest Service defines fire-adapted communities as "a knowledgeable and engaged community in which the awareness and actions of residents regarding infrastructure, buildings, landscaping, and the surrounding ecosystem lessens the need for extensive protection actions and enables the community to safely accept fire as a part of the surrounding landscape."

Three groups are responsible for achieving the three WUI objectives, these are land management agencies, local governments, and individuals.

- Land management agencies eliminate ignition sources by hardening infrastructure, reduce wildfire size and intensity through fuel and vegetation management, reduce vulnerability through community education on individual preparedness, and respond to wildfires with suppression.
- Local governments control human factors through avoiding moderate density development zoning.
- Individuals reduce vulnerability through preparedness in increasing home resistance to ignition, reducing flammability of structures, and eliminating ember generating materials.

Fire-adapted communities have been successful in interacting with wildfires.

The key benefit of fire-adapted communities is that a reliance on individuals as a core block in the responsibility framework reduces WUI expenditures by local, regional, and national governments.

==== Reducing risk through zone defenses ====
The risk of a structure to ignite in a wildfire is calculated by a Home Ignition Zone (HIZ) metric. The HIZ includes at a minimum the space within a 200 foot (61 m) radius around a structure. The HIZ is a guideline for whoever is responsible for structure wildfire protection; landlords and tenants (homeowner if they are the same) are responsible for physically constructing and maintaining defense zones while local government defines land use boundaries in a way that defense zones are effective (note: fire-resistant is arbitrary and is not defined in hours of resistance for a given degree of heat; these guidelines are relaxed for non-evergreen trees which are less flammable; this guide is not intended to prevent combustion of individual structures in a wildfire—it is intended to prevent catastrophic wildfire in the WUI):

- Guidelines for structures:
  - Roof materials are fire-resistant and do not produce embers.
  - Exterior wall materials are fire-resistant.
  - Vents for eaves, attics, foundations, and roof are covered with wire mesh fine enough to catch embers
  - Deck and porch materials are fire-resistant.
- Guidelines for landscaping:
  - Keep vegetation from around windows (heat will break glass).
  - Keep plants farther than 5 feet (1.5 m) from walls; this is a bare dirt no-grow zone, optional to use mowed green lawn grass and non-combustible mulch with sparse deciduous plants.
  - Keep trees from growing within 30 feet (9.1 m) of the structure.
  - Keep vegetation thinned within 100 feet (30 m) of the structure.
- Guidelines for outdoor maintenance:
  - Prune tree limbs back 10 feet (3.0 m) from roofs.
  - Separate tree branches from power lines.
  - Clear fallen debris from roof, gutters, window wells, and under decks.
  - Prune tree branches 6 feet (1.8 m) up from the ground.
  - Burn ground of leaf litter and needles.
  - Remove and dispose of dead trees and shrubs.
- Guidelines for flammables:
  - Keep clear of flammables 30 feet (9.1 m) around primary and auxiliary structures including firewood piles.
  - Keep clear 10 feet (3.0 m) around propane tanks or fuel oil tanks.

==== Challenges to risk management ====
There are three challenges.

- Wildfires are an ecological process that naturally contribute to the development of ecosystems and many wildlands are historically predisposed to periodic fire; eradication of fires in WUI regions is not feasible.
- Coordination of wildfire management efforts is difficult since wildfires are capable of spreading far distances; communities vary in wildfire risk and preparedness.
- Actual wildfire risk and sociopolitical expectations of wildland fire management services are mismatched; real dangers are hidden by overconfidence.

An example of the fire-adapted communities performance was demonstrated in November 2018 when the Camp Fire passed through the community of Concow in Butte County, California. The Concow community was a fire-adapted community. This late season fire provided a stress test of the fire-adapted communities theory. The Concow community was destroyed. The wildfire continued through the community without demonstrating the expected slowing of the flame front. If there was a slowing it was less than anticipated though any slowing contributed to allowing residents to evacuate ahead of the flame front. The wildfire continued through wildlands between the community of Concow and the town of Paradise, California. The wildfire then destroyed the town of Paradise which was in the process of developing into a fire-adapted community. The wildfire ignition is suspected to have originated with unhardened electrical transmission line infrastructure which had recently been redesigned though had not been reconstructed and the new design did not include hardening against ignition where it passed through the WUI. The Camp Fire demonstrated limitations of the fire-adapted community theory in late season wildfires driven by Katabatic winds, and in the land management agencies' responsibility in controlling infrastructure ignition sources.

== See also ==
- Edge effect
- Exurb
- Fenceline community
- Human–wildlife conflict
- Natural environment
  - Habitat destruction
  - Natural landscape
  - Restoration ecology
- Peri-urbanization
- Rural–urban fringe
- Urban sprawl
