= Hotshot crew =

Elite force of wildland firefighters

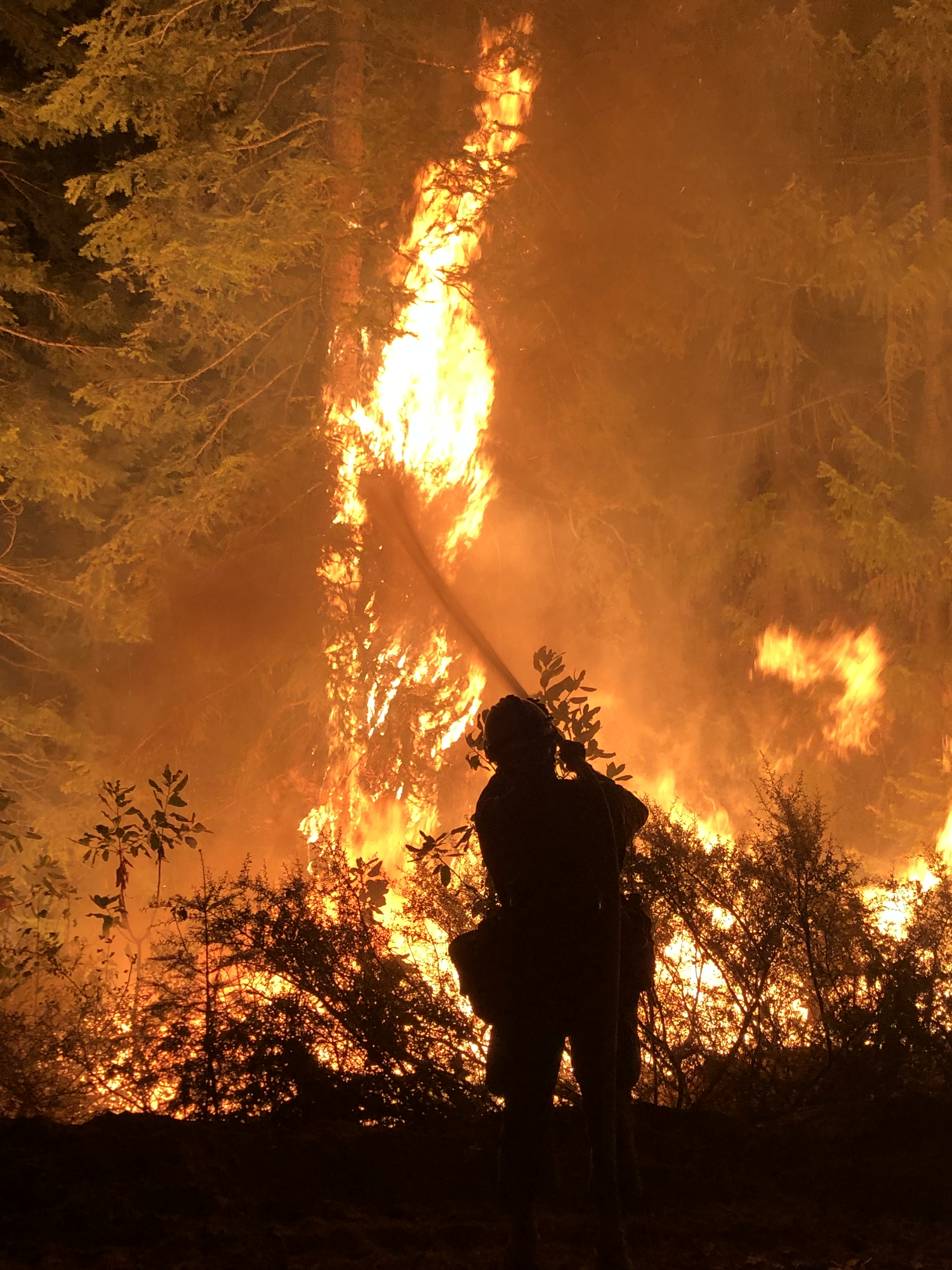
A member of the Ventana Hotshots works to keep fire out of a tree canopy during backfiring operations on the Monument Fire.

In the United States, an Interagency Hotshot Crew, informally known as a hotshot crew, shot crew or IHC, is a team of specially trained wildland firefighters that mainly respond to large, high-priority fires across the country and abroad. They are assigned to work the most challenging parts of the fire and are considered strategic and tactical wildland fire experts. Hotshot crews are considered the most highly trained, skilled and experienced wildland firefighters, along with smokejumpers. They are qualified to provide leadership for initial-attack and extended-attack on wildland fires.

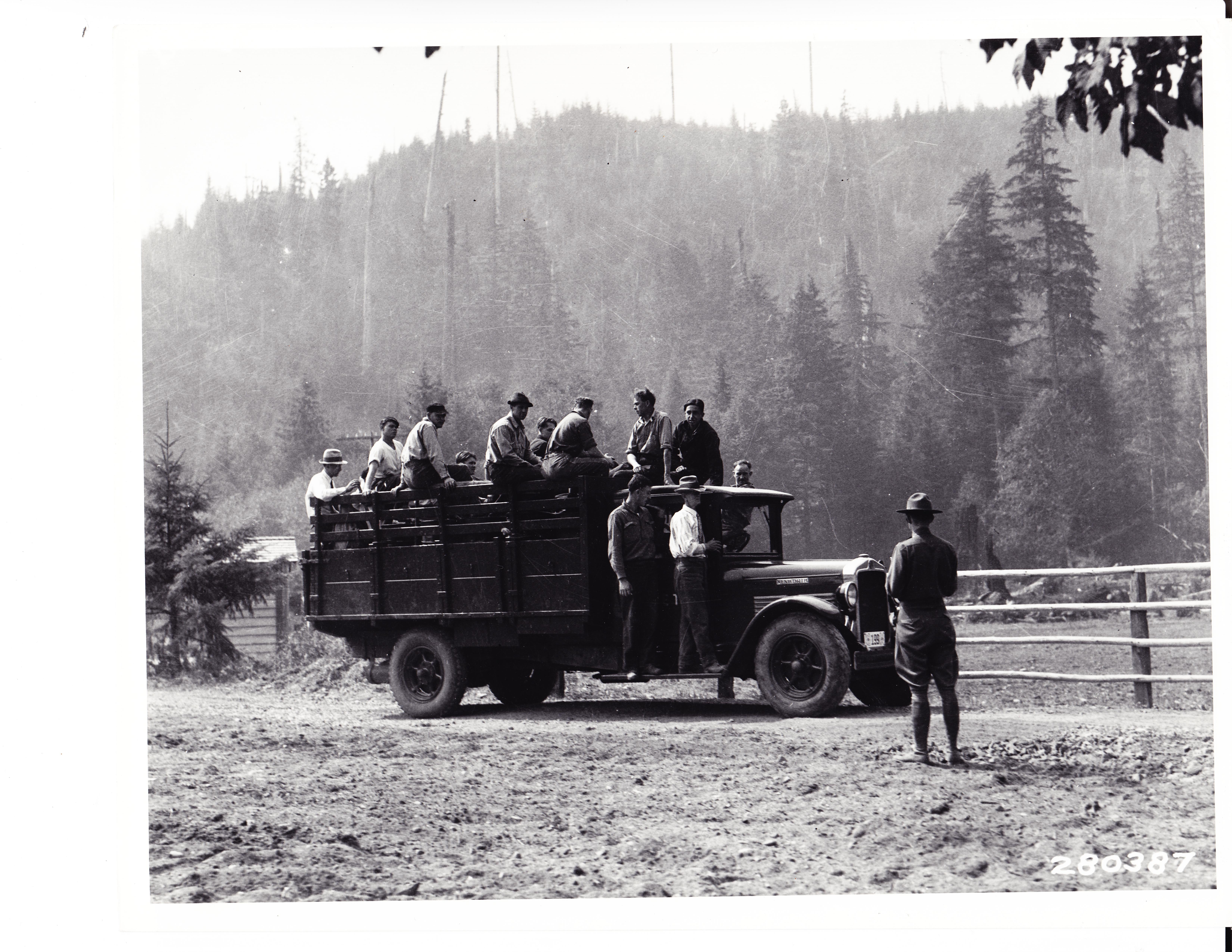
A CCC fire crew at Camp Snider on the Olympic National Forest, Washington, 1933.

Hotshots are trained and equipped to work in remote areas for extended periods of time with minimal logistical support. They are organized by the United States Forest Service, National Park Service, Bureau of Indian Affairs, Bureau of Land Management, and Alaska and Utah state agencies; the National Interagency Fire Center coordinates hotshot crews on the federal level.

== History ==
Prior to the 1930s, wildland firefighting crews were organized on an "as-needed" basis, hiring firefighters without any formal experience or training. The Civilian Conservation Corps, which operated from 1933 until 1942, was a work relief program that employed young men primarily in natural resource conservation projects. CCC members were also utilized for fire suppression operations, however, marking the first time that standing crews had been established for that purpose.

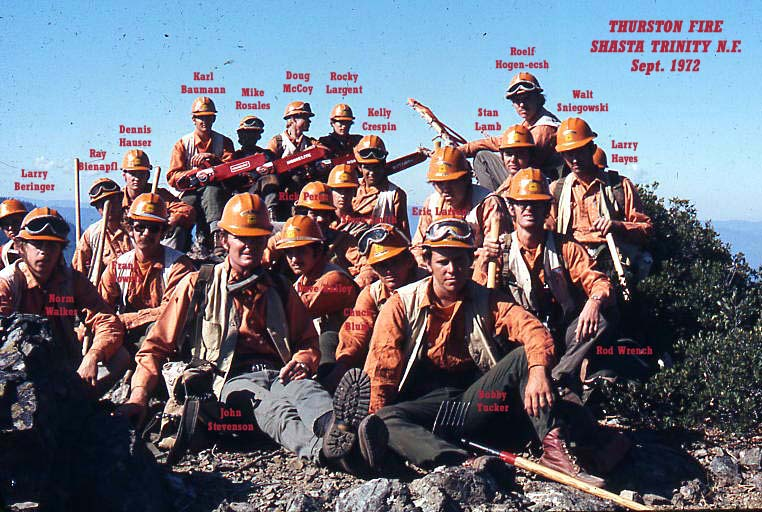
Little Tujunga Hotshot Crew of the Angeles National Forest in 1977.

At least one of the first crews carrying the name of "hotshots" originated out of a former CCC camp in the San Bernardino National Forest in Southern California. Conflicting sources report the first hotshot crews as starting in 1946 (Del Rosa and Los Padres Hotshots) or 1947 (Del Rosa and El Cariso Hotshots). In 1961, the Inter-Regional Fire Suppression (IRFS) program was developed, establishing six 30-man crews across the Western United States. These IRFS crews were stationed near airports for quick transportation to high-priority fires. Due to their effectiveness and value in fire management, the program expanded to 19 IRFS crews by 1974.

In 1980, the term Interagency Hotshot Crew was adopted by IRFS crews. In the mid-1990s, an Interagency Hotshot Crew Operations Guide was developed to standardize the training, qualifications and responsibilities of hotshot crews.

By 2008, the first municipal fire department stood up their own Interagency Hotshot Crew. The Granite Mountain Hotshots were headquartered out of the Prescott Fire Department and operated until June 30, 2013, when the Yarnell Hill Fire overran and killed 19 of their 20 firefighters.

As years went by, shot crews began to increase standards for physical competence and qualifications for entire crews. Several crews have since lost status, making them a Type 2 Initial Attack handcrew until they're able to regain the title of hotshot crew. Becoming a hotshot crew requires multiple evaluations, extremely high physical standards, and many National Wildfire Coordinating Group certifications and taskbooks.

As of 2018, there are 113 hotshot crews across the nation.

== Operations ==
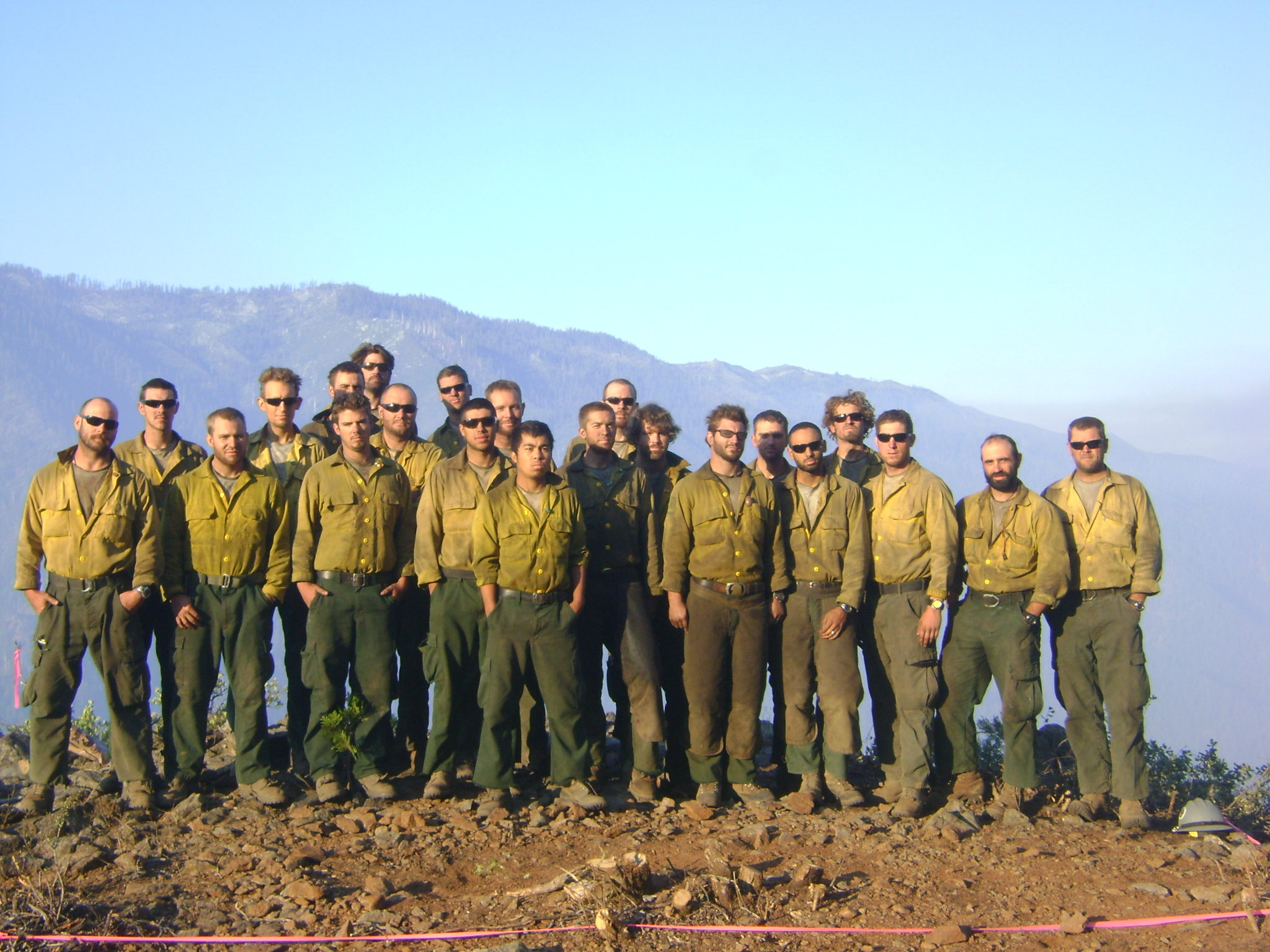
A crew photo of the El Dorado Hotshots of the El Dorado National Forest, 2010.

A hotshot crew consists of approximately 20–30 members, led by a minimum of one superintendent, one or two assistant superintendents, two or three squad leaders, and two senior firefighters. Hotshot crews must also be composed of at least 80% second year or more senior firefighters, allowing for up to two rookies per fire season.

Hotshot crews are proficient in a range of fire suppression tactics. Like other handcrews, IHCs are primarily tasked with constructing, firing out and holding firelines, through the use of chainsaws, hand tools, ignition devices and water delivery equipment. Hotshot crews can engage in all phases of wildfire response, from initial attack to mop-up, but are typically assigned to extended attack fires which have passed the 72 hour initial attack period.

In order to effectively perform their duties, hotshot crews must maintain a high level of physical fitness. The minimum physical fitness standards for hotshots set by the National Wildfire Coordinating Group are: a 3-mile hike carrying a 60-pound pack in under 90 minutes, one and a half-mile run in 10:30 or less, 25 push-ups in 60 seconds, 45 sit-ups in 60 seconds and 7 pull-ups. These are the bare minimum requirements prescribed by policy and most firefighters far exceed these requirements.

While not fighting fires, hotshot crews typically work on their host units to meet resource goals such as thinning, prescribed fire operations, forest improvement, and trail construction projects. Hotshot crews can also respond to other emergency incidents, including search and rescue and disaster response. In 2010, the Cherokee IHC was assigned to clear trees downed by rare tornadoes in Prospect Park and Kissena Park in New York City, their first deployment to an urban setting.

== Fatal accidents ==
=== Loop Fire ===
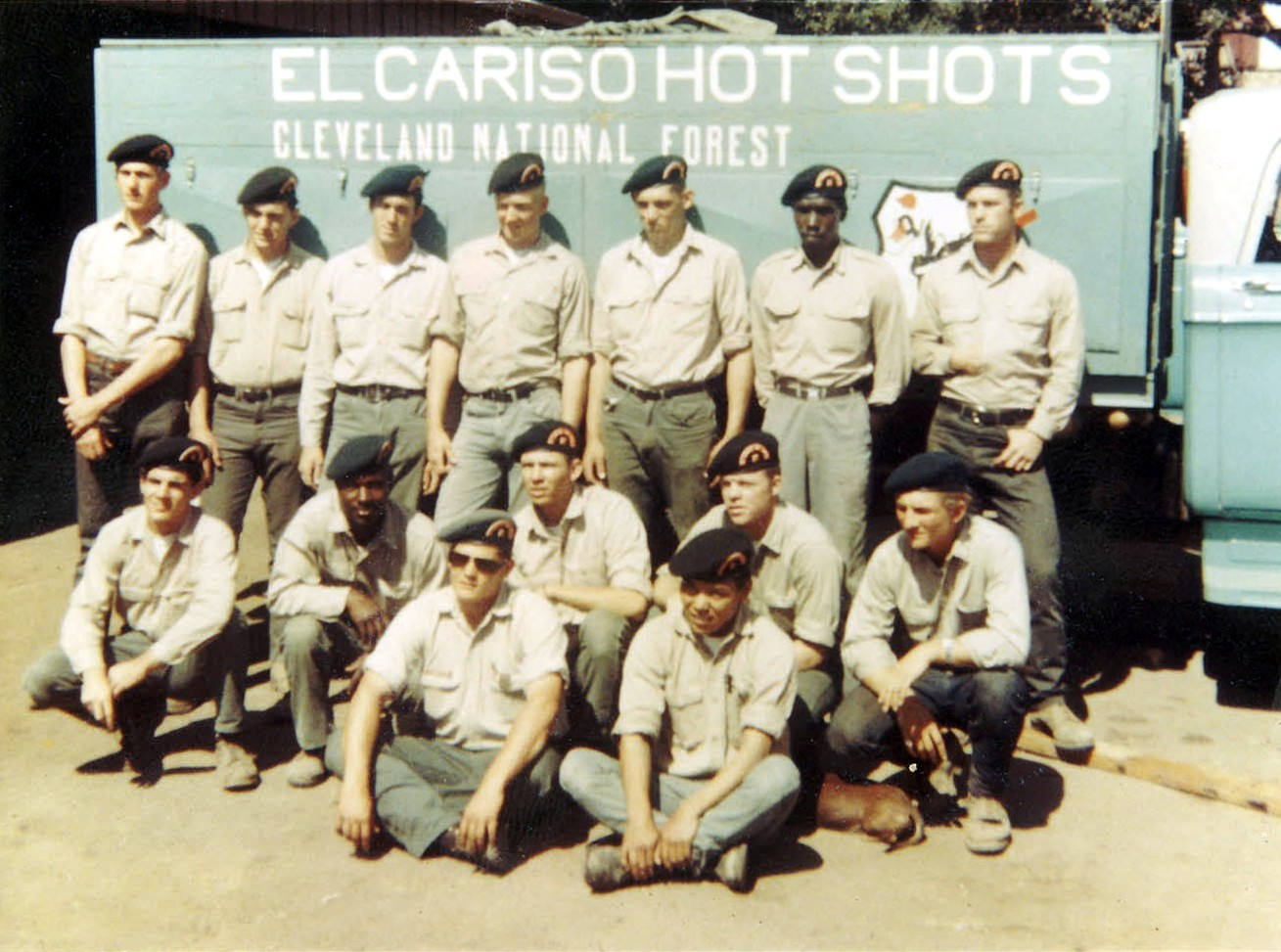
1966 El Cariso Hotshots Crew 2

On November 1, 1966, the El Cariso hotshot crew were trapped by flames in the Loop Fire as they worked on a steep hillside in Pacoima Canyon in Angeles National Forest. An unanticipated upslope wind came up in the afternoon and a spot fire was fanned and funneled up the steep canyon. The crew were cutting handline downhill and most of the crew were unable to reach safety in the few seconds they had.

Ten members of the crew died on the Loop Fire that day, and another two members died from burn injuries in the following days. Most of the 19 El Cariso crew members who survived were critically burned and remained hospitalized for some time. The Downhill Indirect Checklist, improved firefighting equipment and better fire-behavior training all resulted, in part, from the lives lost on this fire.

=== South Canyon Fire ===
On July 6, 1994, nine members of a hotshot crew based in Prineville, Oregon, died after being overtaken by the fast-moving South Canyon Fire on Storm King Mountain west of Glenwood Springs, Colorado. Five other firefighters, three smokejumpers and two helitack firefighters, also died in the incident.

=== Yarnell Hill Fire ===
On June 30, 2013, nineteen members of the Granite Mountain Hotshots perished in the Yarnell Hill Fire near Yarnell, Arizona. 19 of the 20 members of the crew were killed when they entered a box canyon after leaving a safety zone. All of the entrapped members of the Granite Mountain Hotshots deployed their fire shelters. Due to the narrowness of the box canyon and the intensity of the fire, all 19 were overwhelmed and killed. The incident was made into a film, Only the Brave.

== See also ==
- Wildland fire module
- Smokejumper
- Wildland fire engine
- Wildland fire suppression
