= Handcrew =

Class of wildland firefighters

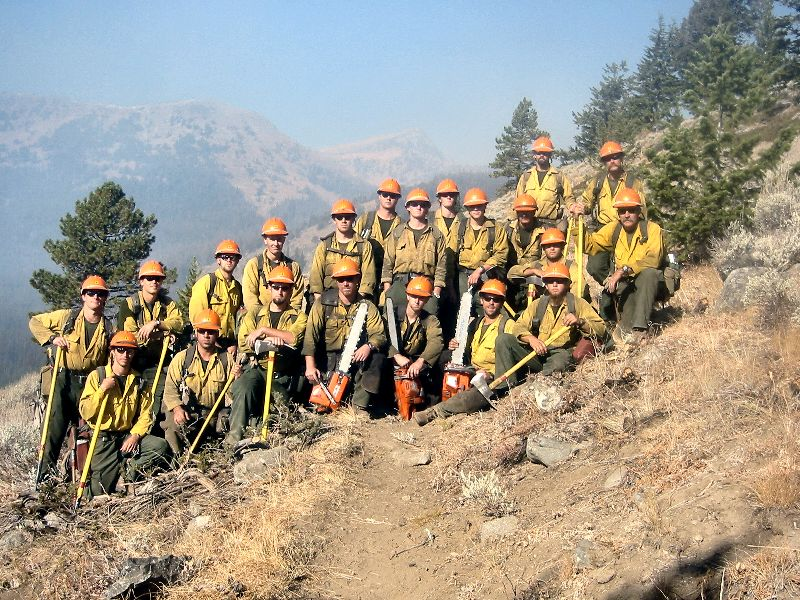
The Los Padres Interagency Hotshot Crew, based out of the Los Padres National Forest.

Handcrews are diverse teams of career and temporary wildland firefighters. These crews have the responsibilities of constructing firelines. These lines are generally constructed around wildfires to control them. In the United States, handcrews are typically classified into one of three types: Type 1 IHC, Type 2 (Initial Attack) or Type 2. Type 1 crews, hotshots, are the highest qualified and most experienced crews.

== History ==
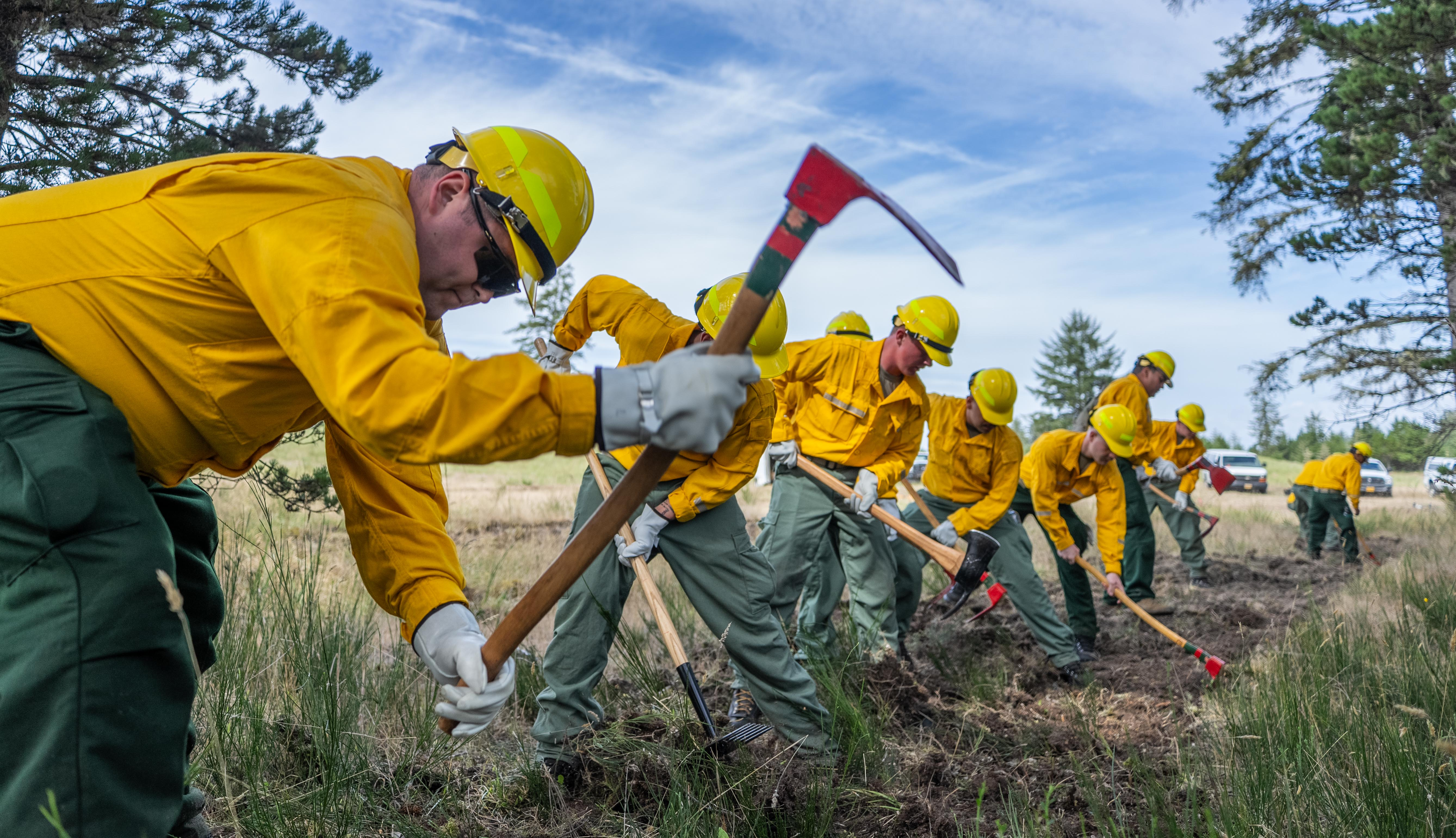
Oregon Army National Guard conducting comprehensive wildland firefighting training. In this image, the Guardsmen are practicing digging fireline with adzes, McLeods, and Pulaskis.

Prior to 1942, firefighting efforts were organized as-needed, with no formal training or organization. In 1933, the Civilian Conservation Corps, also known as Roosevelt's Tree Army, began operating in National Forests nationwide. In addition to planting trees and maintaining the environment, they were used for fire suppression operations. This was the first time pre-established crews were ordered to fires. In 1948, the first hotshot crew was established in the Los Padres National Forest under the name Los Padres Hotshots. The crew was made up of 35 crewmembers who were available 24/7/365 until 1965. In 1961, the Inter-Regional Fire Suppression (IRFS) program was developed, establishing six 30-man crews across the Western United States. The first woman to join a hotshot crew was Deanne Shulman, who joined the Los Prieto Hotshots in 1976.

Several fatality events, such as the Mann Gulch Fire of 1949, the Rattlesnake Fire of 1953, the Loop Fire Disaster of 1966, South Canyon Fire of 1994, Thirtymile Fire of 2001, and the Yarnell Hill Fire of 2013 caused standard operating procedure to become standardized amongst wildland firefighters. In 1980, the term interagency hotshot crew was adopted by IRFS crews. In the mid-1990s, an Interagency Hotshot Crew Operations Guide was developed to standardize the training, qualifications and responsibilities of hotshot crews. This guide was updated in 2016 by a joint committee of federal agencies.

Crews have been established by several federal, state, and county agencies. Currently, there are 90 interagency hotshot crews nationwide. The agencies that employ wildland firefighters include the following: United States Forest Service, Bureau of Land Management, U.S. Fish and Wildlife Service, Bureau of Indian Affairs, National Park Service, and several dozen state forestry agencies, such as CALFIRE. In addition to federal and state agencies, some wildfire-prone counties have dedicated handcrews, such as Orange County and San Bernardino.

== Structure ==
A hand crew typically consists of 18-24 firefighters. As a crew, they are capable of initial attack, and of breaking up into squads in order to meet multiple objectives at the same time. They are often the first on the scene responsible for constructing a fireline. Handcrews are generally distinguished from engine crews due to their size and role. Handcrews hike significantly more and are called upon for more remote fires which engines cannot reach.

Within a crew, there is one crew boss or superintendent (in Type 1 crews), who leads the crew, organizes training, and implements tactics. Below that, there is an assistant crew boss or superintendent who assists the crew boss in their duties and hiring of firefighters. The rest of the firefighters are divided into squads, led by squad bosses or squaddies. These squaddies typically have 2-3 years of firefighting experience and are certified as FFT1s (Firefighter Type 1) and/or Incident Commander Type 5 (ICT5).

Handcrews are usually a mix of career and seasonal firefighters. As crew typing goes up, there are typically fewer temporary firefighters. Temporary seasonal firefighters are recruited each fall-spring for the summer fire season, which lasts from late May to mid September in most regions.

== Role ==
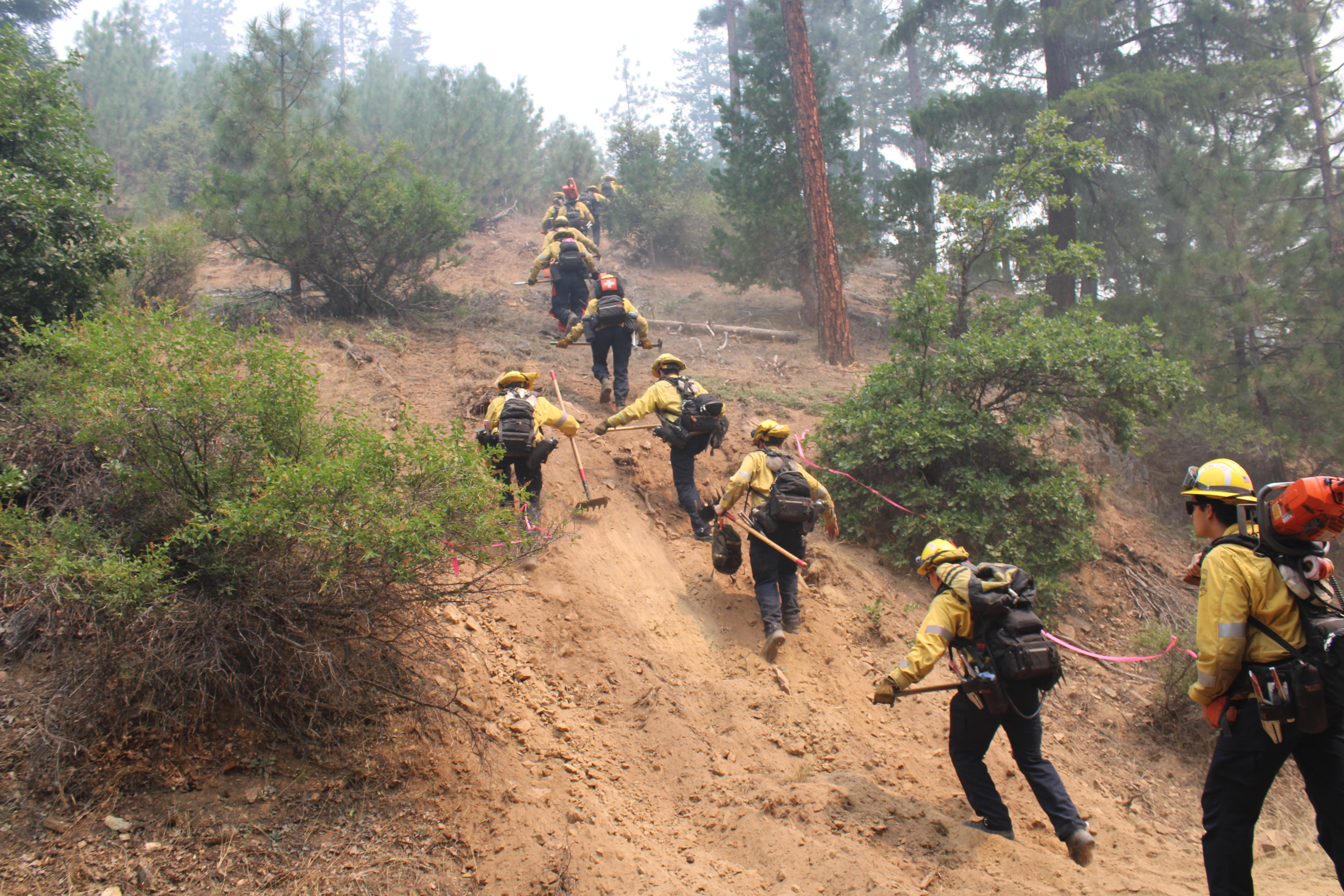
CALFIRE handcrew hiking to the Smokey Fire off Beaver Creek Road on August 4, 2022.

Hand crews specialize in using hand tools such as shovels, chainsaws, axes, pumps, water hoses, and drip torches. They use these tools to create firelines – strips of land cleared of flammable materials and dug down to mineral soil, typically around 18 inches wide along a wildfire’s perimeter. They also carry out firing operations, the controlled burning of vegetation ahead of a wildfire to limit the wildfire's ability to spread. As a fire is kept within the lines established, it is labeled as contained.

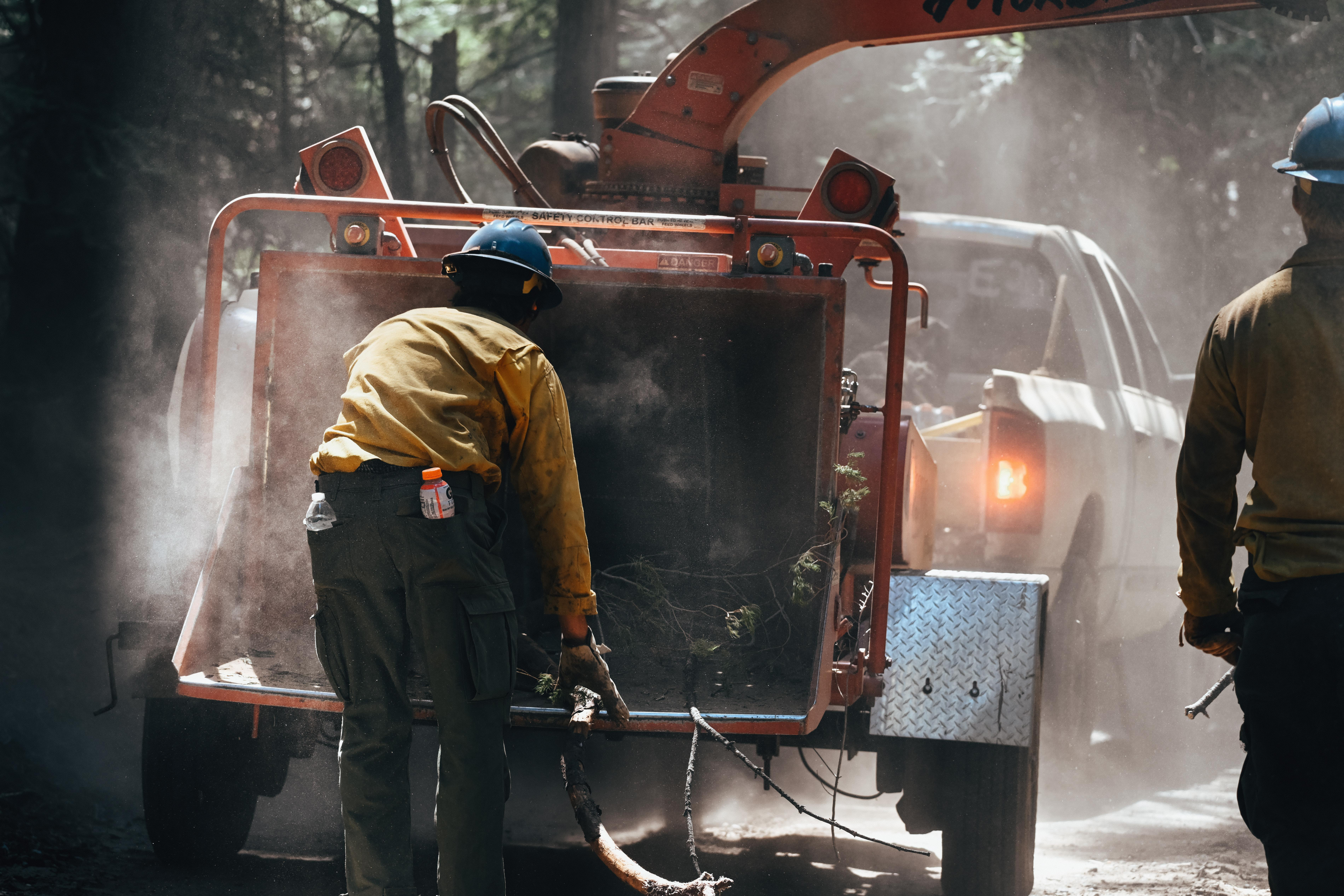
Crews with the Los Padres National Forest perform fuels reduction operations using a woodchipper in July 2022.

Once a fire is contained, hand crews strengthen these initial containment measures during the mop-up phase of wildland fire management by extinguishing embers, searching and destroying for any heat or smokes visible, conducting full grids of the fire to locate any hidden fire, and cold trailing (gridding on hands and knees) it. Once a fire is mopped up and gridded, it is generally considered controlled.

Outside of active wildland fire suppression, hand crews may also work on prescribed burns and rehabilitate burned areas. In addition to ecological work, crews assist in many manual labor tasks in the district they're assigned to, including but not limited to chainsaw operations, fuels reduction, preemptive firebreak construction, and patrols along a district's land.

== Types ==
There are 3 main types of handcrew:

- Type 1: Interagency Hotshots Crews (IHC) are known for faster production, highly skilled, extensive training, advanced qualifications, and arduous physical standards.
- Type 2 Initial Attack (IA): The U.S. Forest Service has crews that function as a normal Type 2 crews but can form into three or four separate squads of 4 – 6 people capable to initial attack fires separately with a qualified incident commander each.
- Type 2 crews do not have IA capability nor do they meet the same standards as an IHC.
