= FUM =

Fum or FUM may refer to:

- Fum language
- Thurman "Fum" McGraw (1927–2000), American football player
- Friends United Meeting
- Ferdowsi University of Mashhad, in Iran
- Fermi–Ulam model
- Fire use module
- Funds under management
