= Wildfire suppression =

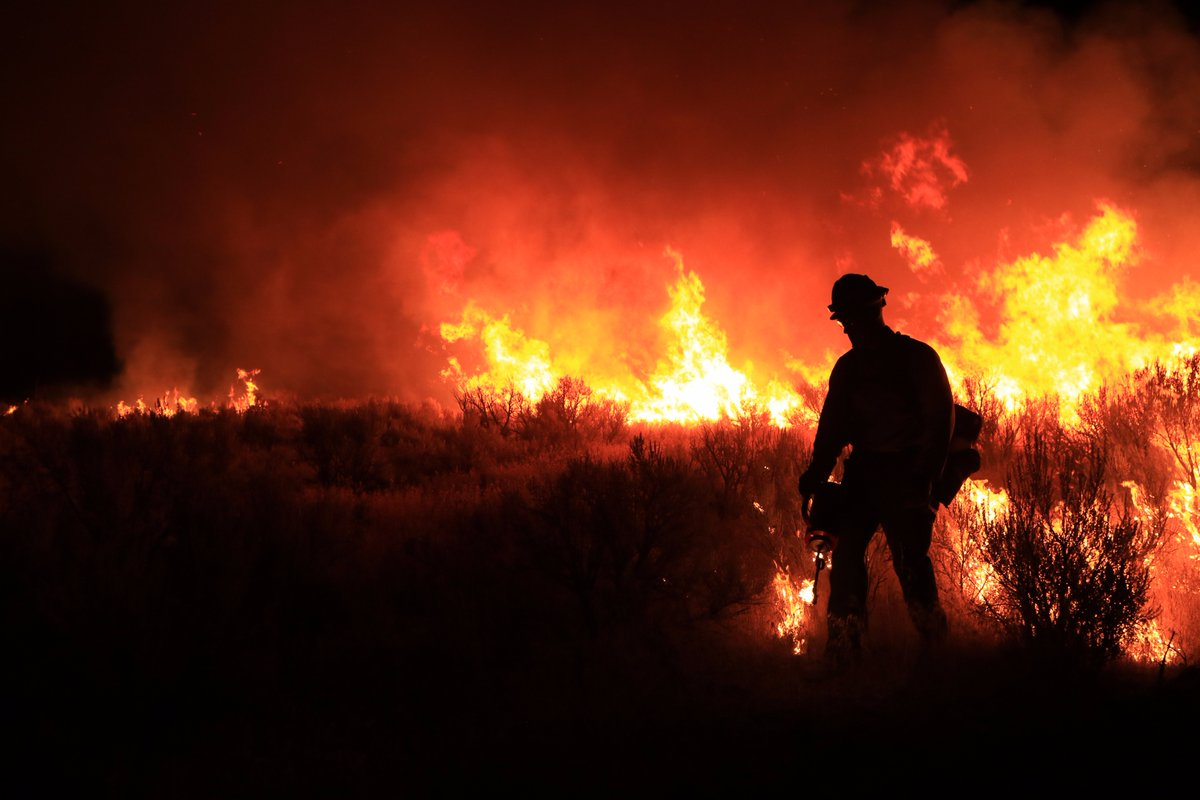
A wildland firefighter from the Idaho Bureau of Land Management lays down fire from a driptorch.

Wildfire suppression efforts depend on many factors such as the available fuels, atmospheric conditions, topography, and the size of the wildfire. Due to these complicating factors and additional remoteness, wildland firefighters use different tactics, techniques, and procedures, while using specially designed vehicles and tools. Wildland firefighters work to suppress flames, construct firelines, and extinguish flames in order to protect life, property, and natural wilderness.

Firefighters often encounter fires that spill into smaller human settlements, leading to the development of the wildland–urban interface.

In the United States and other countries, aggressive wildfire suppression aimed at minimizing fires has often protected significant chunks of wilderness, but has sometimes contributed to accumulation of fuel loads, increasing the risk of large, catastrophic fires.

== History ==
=== Australia ===
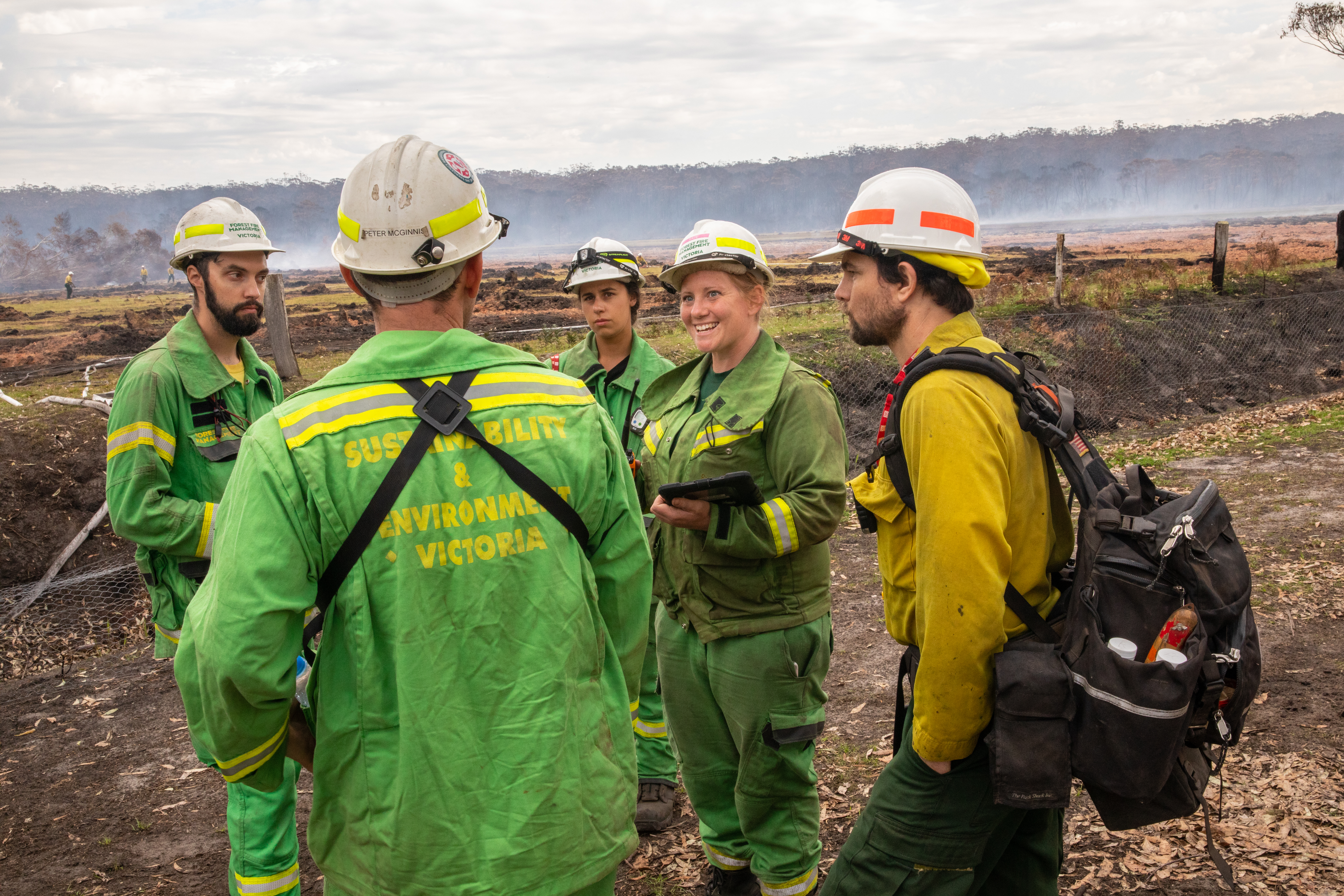
U.S. and Australian firefighters discussing tactics at the Peat Fire near Cape Conran Coastal Park, Victoria. The U.S. firefighter is in the distinctive yellow and green Nomex uniform.

Wildfire, known in Australia as bushfire, has long played a major role in Australian ecology and society. Early European navigators of the 17th century, who approached the west coast of Australia, reported seeing fires on the land. Records of the 1830s and 1840s indicated that aboriginals used fires for driving game from thickets of scrub and to induce young growth which would attract the game. It is also recorded that they lit such fires against the wind and were careful to try and control the fires—a matter in which they were reputed to be astonishingly dexterous. When the early European settlers attempted to emulate the Aboriginal methods in order to clear land or improve pasture, indiscriminate burning and a lack of knowledge of fire behaviour soon led to an intolerable situation, and a need for a controlled approach became apparent.

Early bush fire legislation across the colonies in the second half of the 19th century restricted when, where, and by whom prescribed burns may be lit. Many of these acts also provided for the creation of volunteer bush fire brigades, their registration and legal protection.

The early 20th century saw the evolution of local bushfire brigades into statewide agencies spurred by many large and devastating fires that highlighted the need for further organization, modernization, and centralized command structures. In NSW the need was recognized for improved access to remote and mountainous terrain for the purpose of fire mitigation and defence. In 1958, Fire Prevention Associations were established to develop fire trails on Crown Land. These trails evolved into a strategic network providing engine access and control lines, largely shaping the engine based tactics used in the region.

=== Canada ===
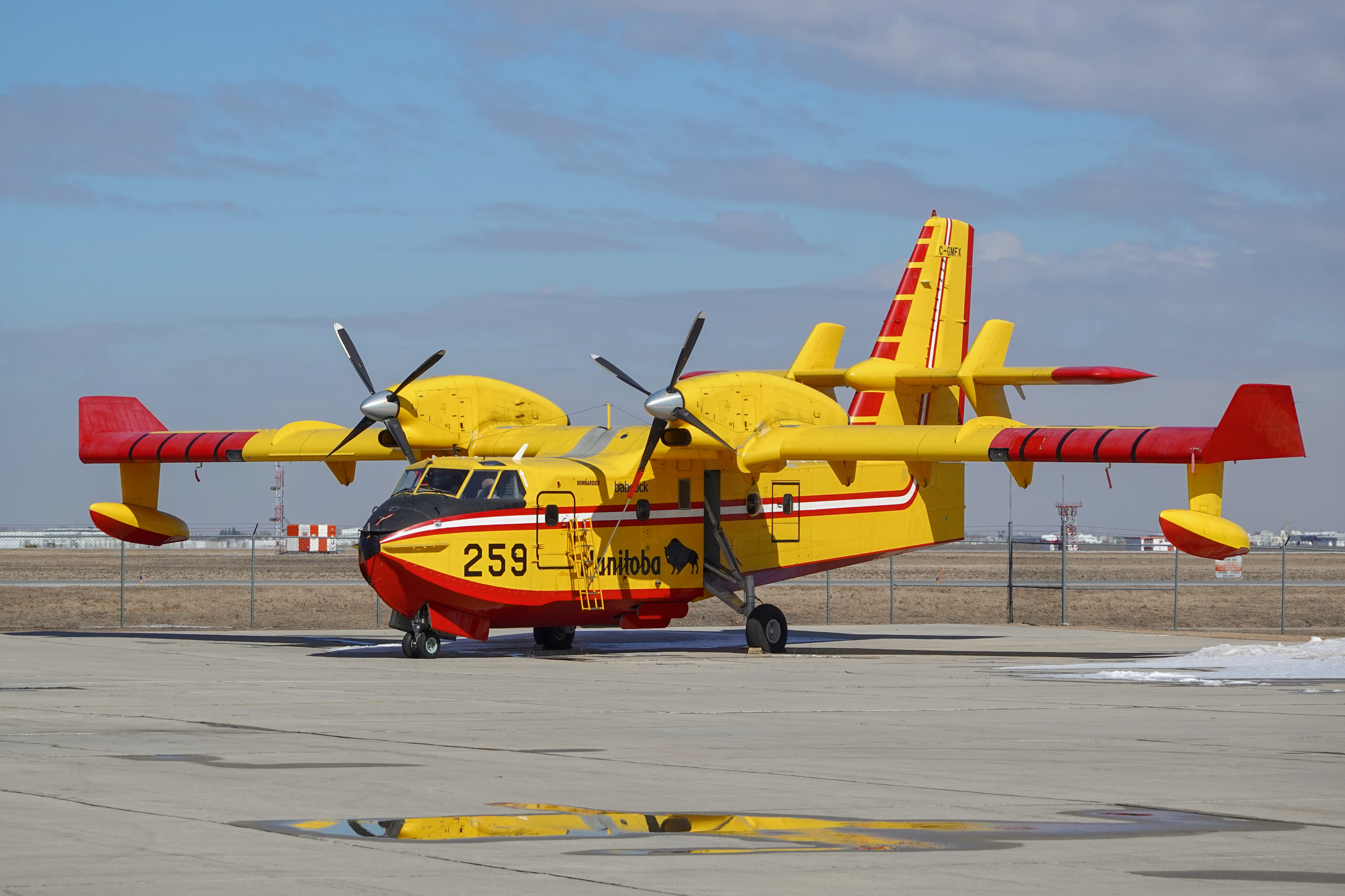
A Canadair CL-415 owned by the Government of Manitoba to combat wildfires

Canada contains approximately 3,964,000 km^{2} (1,531,000 sq mi) of forest land. Seventy-five percent of this is boreal forest, made up primarily of coniferous trees. More than 90 percent of Canadian forest land is publicly owned, and the provincial and territorial governments are responsible for fire-suppression activities. The Canadian Interagency Forest Fire Centre (CIFFC) coordinates assistance between all provincial and territorial wildfire management agencies.

During a typical year there are over 9,000 forest fires in Canada, burning an average of 2.5 million hectares (ha) or 9,700 square miles (25,000 km^{2}). The number of fires and area burned can vary dramatically from year to year. Average suppression costs are $500 million to $1 billion annually.

In Canada, two-thirds of all forest fires are caused by people, while lightning causes the remaining third. Despite this, lightning fires account for over 85 percent of the area burned in Canada, largely because many of the lightning-caused fires occur in remote, inaccessible areas. Currently about ninety percent of forest fires are fought. Generally fires near communities, industrial infrastructure, and forests with high commercial and recreation value are given high priority for suppression efforts. In remote areas and wilderness parks, fires may be left to burn as part of the natural ecological cycle.

=== United States ===
Prior to European colonization, Indigenous communities embraced fire to modify nature and change their environment. Once populations began to grow across the U.S., wildfires started to trigger unprecedented destruction of property and sometimes resulted in massive death tolls. Greater impact on people's lives led to government intervention and changes to how wildfires were addressed.

The same day as the Great Chicago Fire, a much larger, more deadly fire occurred. The Peshtigo Fire broke out on the morning of October 8, 1871. It burned for three days, and while estimates vary, the consensus is that it killed more than 1,200 people – making it the deadliest wildfire in American history to this day. In addition to the number of people killed, the fire burned more than 1.2 million acres of land and spread to nearby towns, where it caused even more damage. The entire town of Peshtigo was destroyed within an hour of the start of the fire.

As a result of the 1871 fire breakouts, the federal government saw that it needed to act. This led in 1876 to the creation of the Office of Special Agent in the U.S. Department of Agriculture to assess the quality and conditions of forests in the United States. As the forerunner of the U.S. Forest Service, this was the first time that wildfire management was placed under government purview.

In the aftermath of the Great Fire of 1910, the U.S. Forest Service received considerable recognition for its firefighting efforts, including a doubling of its budget from Congress. This fire also lead to the implementation of the 10 o'clock rule, which required that all wildfires be suppressed by 10 am on the second day of the fire. The Great Fire of 1910 is often considered a significant impetus in the development of early wildfire prevention and suppression strategies.

Since the Great Fire of 1910, wildland fire agencies have continued to develop tactics after fatality incidents such as the Rattlesnake Fire of 1953, South Canyon Fire of 1994, the Thirtymile Fire of 2001, and the Esperanza Fire of 2006. Fire shelters and equipment have grown over time and fatalities continue to decrease throughout the modern era. However, due to the harmful policies of the past, such as the 10 o'clock rule, wildland fires have increasingly grown in size, strength, and destruction. In the 1970s, the environmental movement brought along the idea of prescribed burning to reduce fuel loading, lower fire hazards, and reintroduce fire into native ecosystems.

Fire season is beginning earlier in year due to widespread drought and reduced snowpack. In 2026, a record drought and extremely limited snowfall has led to an earlier start of the fire season and more intense fires, especially in the Southeast (Florida, Georgia). As the season progresses, the American West is expected to have a significantly above average intensity fire year.

The Global Fire Weather Database is designed to analyze and suppress the underlying conditions that drive wildfires.

== Organization ==
=== Australia ===
Notable fire services tasked with wildfire suppression include NPWS (National Parks and Wildlife Service, NSW), the New South Wales Rural Fire Service (NSWRFS), the South Australian Country Fire Service, the Western Australian Parks and Wildlife Service, the Victorian Department of Environment, Land, Water and Planning (DELWP), Country Fire Authority in Victoria, Rural Fire Service Queensland, Tasmania Fire Service, and several privately managed forestry services. The majority of wildland firefighters in Australia are volunteers. Currently NSWRFS maintains the largest wildfire management service in the world, with approximately 70,000 volunteers.

=== Canada ===
Wildfires are managed by the Canadian Interagency Forest Fire Centre (CIFFC) which is a not-for-profit corporation owned and operated by the federal, provincial and territorial wildland fire management agencies to coordinate resource sharing, mutual aid, and information sharing. In addition, the CIFFC also serves as a collective focus and facilitator of wildland fire cooperation and coordination nationally and internationally in long-range fire management planning, program delivery and human resource strategies.

Firefighters engaging in a prescribed burn during a Columbia Gorge Prescribed Fire training in 2024.

=== United States ===
In the United States, wildfire suppression is administered by several land management agencies including the U.S. Forest Service, Bureau of Land Management (BLM), U.S. Fish and Wildlife Service (USFWS), National Park Service (NPS), the Bureau of Reclamation, the Army Corps of Engineers, the Bureau of Indian Affairs (BIA), and state departments of forestry. All of these groups contribute to the National Wildfire Coordinating Group and the National Interagency Fire Center.

In 2026, a new secretary's order consolidated the Department of the Interior's (DOI) firefighting agencies, creating the U.S. Wildland Fire Service (USWFS). This new agency under the DOI contains the BLM, USFWS, NPS, and the BIA. As of May 20th, 2026, USWFS has not received official funding from Congress. The agency is slated to be funded in fiscal year 2026.

The National Interagency Fire Center hosts the National Interagency Coordination Center (NICC). NICC's primary responsibility is positioning and managing national resources (i.e. Interagency Hotshot Crews, smokejumpers, air tankers, handcrews, helitack crews, wildland fire engines, incident management teams, caterers, mobile shower units, and command radio repeaters). Reporting to NICC are 10 Geographic Area Coordination Centers (GACC): Alaska, Great Basin, Northern Rockies, Rocky Mountains, Southern California, Northern California, Eastern, Southern, Southwest, and Northwest. Under each GACC are several dispatch zones.

== Fire management ==
=== Suppression tactics ===
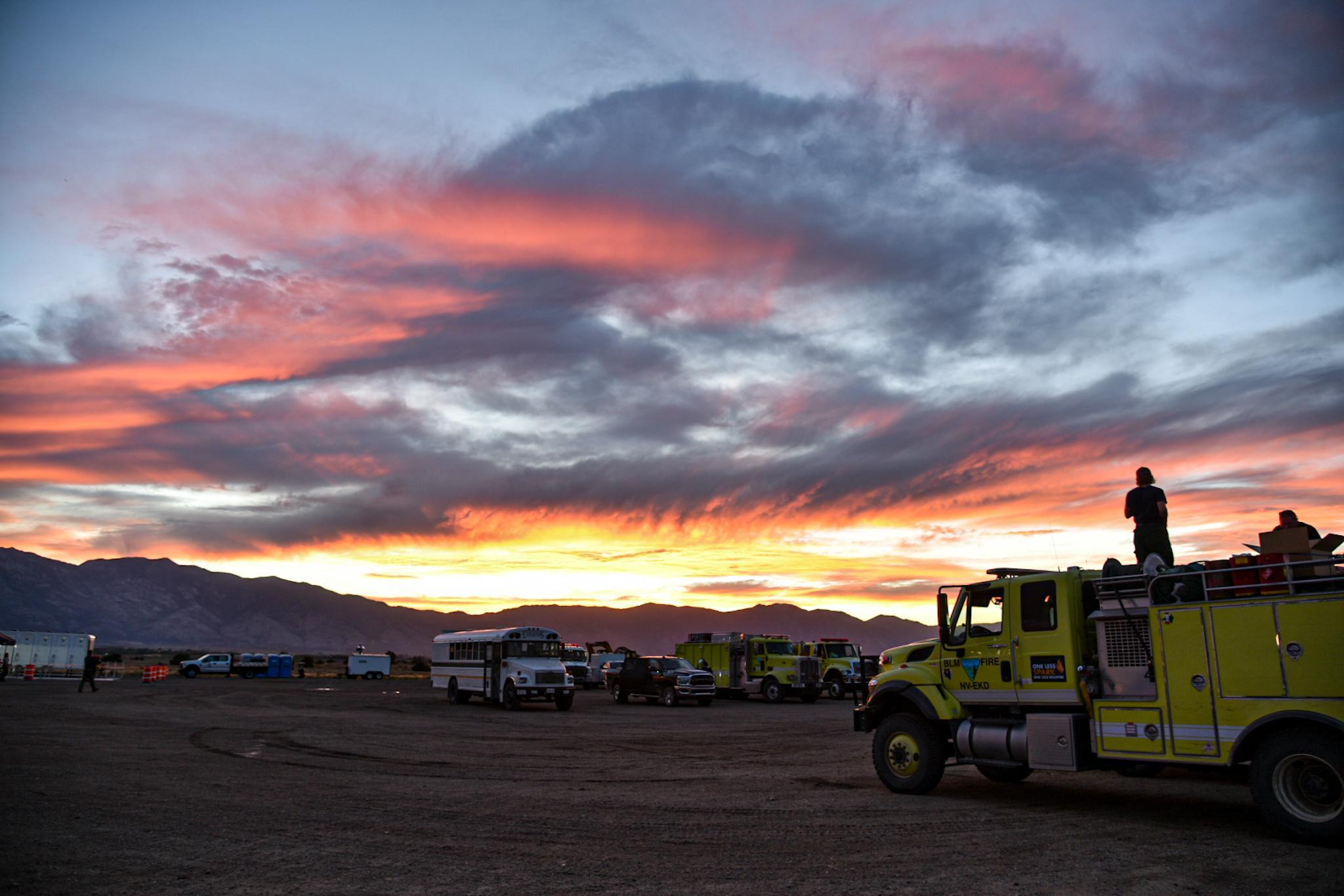
U.S. Bureau of Land Management wildland fire engines at the Numbers Fire Incident Command Post during sunset.

Weather and fuel conditions are large factors in the decisions made on a fire. The National Fire Danger Rating System (NFDRS) helps incident commanders, prevention specialists, and fuels officers make decisions about suppression strategies, burn bans, and land management policy. Large fires often become extended campaigns. Incident command posts (ICPs) and other temporary fire camps are constructed to provide food, showers, and rest to fire crews.

==== Direct attack ====
All fire suppression activities are based from an anchor point (such as lake, rock slide, road or other natural or artificial fire break). From an anchor point, firefighters can work to contain a wildland fire without the fire outflanking them.

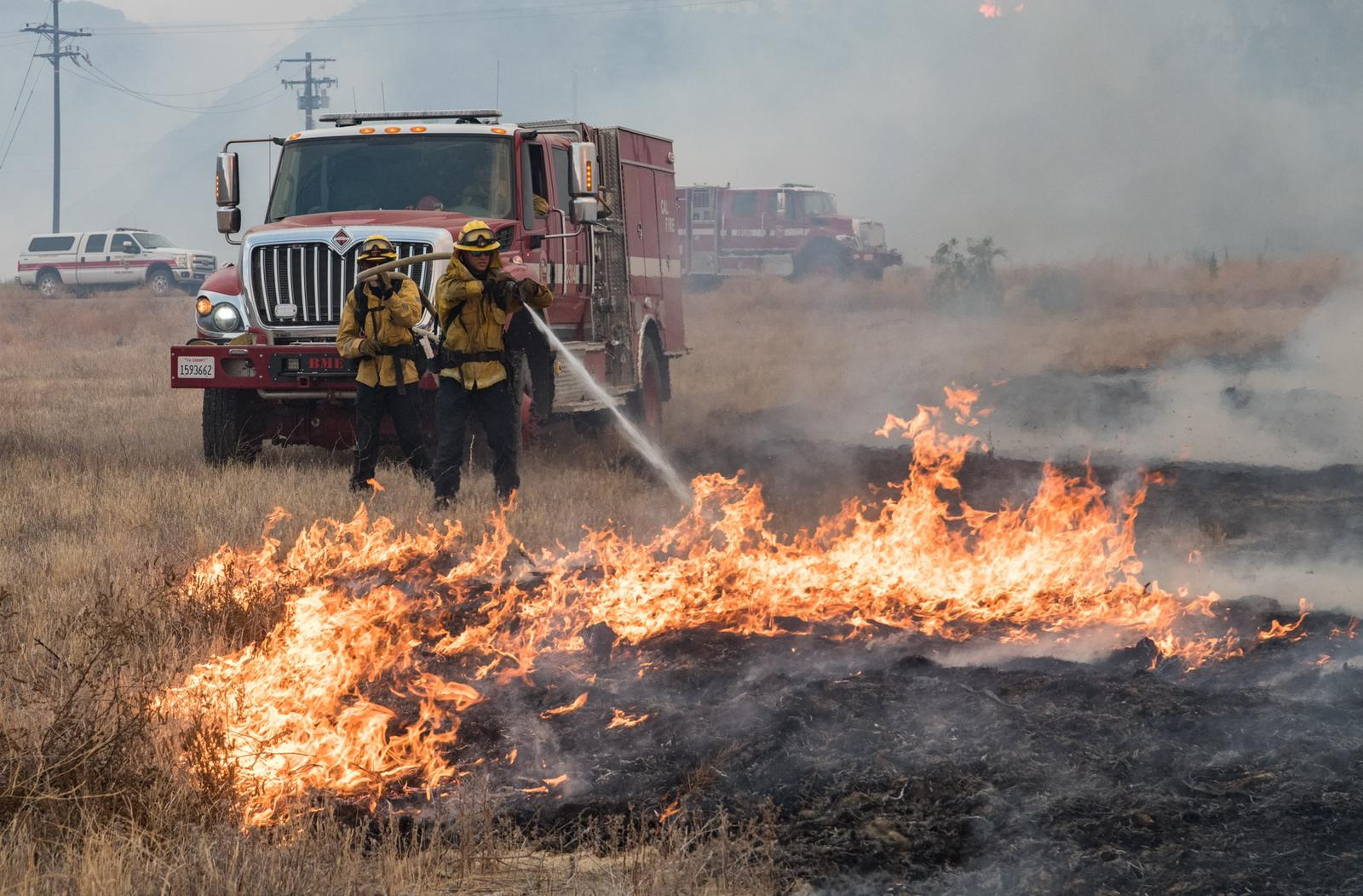
CAL FIRE firefighters battle a hotspot of the Fairview Fire. This technique is known as pump and roll, or mobile attack. It involves a firefighter spraying water while the engine moves behind them.

Direct attack is immediate suppression of the fire with hand tools, water, foam, or line construction. Wildland firefighters often go 'direct' as it is much safer and more effective. Firefighters can easily step into the already burnt area (the black) and use it as an ad-hoc safety zone. Additionally, by attacking the fire directly, the firefighters can drastically reduce the area burnt. However, direct attack has limited effectiveness when fire behavior increases to crowning or torching fire behavior.

Wildland firefighters typically construct an 18-inch wide handline using their tools, such as Pulaskis, rhinos, rakehoes, and adzes. These lines will stop a majority of fires, but sometimes, conditions are more extreme. Bulldozers with specially trained operators can create dozerline which is much wider and harder for the fire to jump over or slop over. A spot fire is ignited further away from the main fire, while slopovers are directly on the other side of the fireline from the main fire.

Firefighters also can use engines in a mobile attack strategy, moving along the edge of the fire and dousing it with water. This technique is primarily used in grasslands, where low intensity fires can be easily knocked down.

==== Indirect attack ====
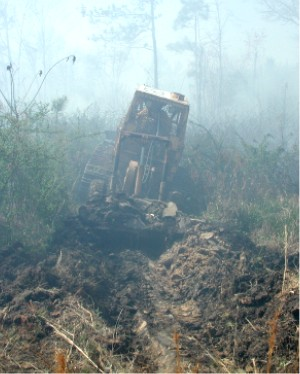
A bulldozer plows a control line in advance of a wildfire in Georgetown, South Carolina.

Preparatory suppression tactics used a distance away from the oncoming fire are considered indirect. Firelines may be built in this manner as well. Fuel reduction, indirect firelines, contingency firelines, backburning and wetting unburnt fuels are examples. This method may allow for more effective planning. It may allow for more ideally placed firelines in lighter fuels using natural barriers to fire and for safer firefighter working conditions in less smoke filled and cooler areas. However, it may also allow for more burned acreage, larger hotter fires, and the possibility of wasted time constructing unused firelines.

===== Backfiring =====
Lines may also be created by backfiring: creating small, low-intensity fires using driptorches or fusees. Backfiring provides a wider perimeter and is usually used to change the force of the convection column. The resultant fires are extinguished by firefighters or, ideally, directed in such a way that they meet the main fire front, at which point both fires run out of flammable material and are thus extinguished.

===== Long-term solutions =====
Additionally, the use of long-term fire retardants, fire-fighting foams, and superabsorbent polymer gels may be used. Such compounds reduce the flammability of materials by either blocking the fire physically or by initiating a chemical reaction that stops the fire. However, fire retardants often have a negative effect on the ecosystem, especially riverine and lacustrine environments. These chemicals are also often harmful to humans, leading to hormone disruption.

Another method for controlling fires is forest thinning. According to the U.S. Department of Agriculture, mechanical thinning of forests is a multifaceted process and often involves piling brush, pruning branches, and creating fuel breaks. Forest thinning and ground burn are more effective in reducing wildfire risk together rather than just thinning or burning.

==== Mop-up ====
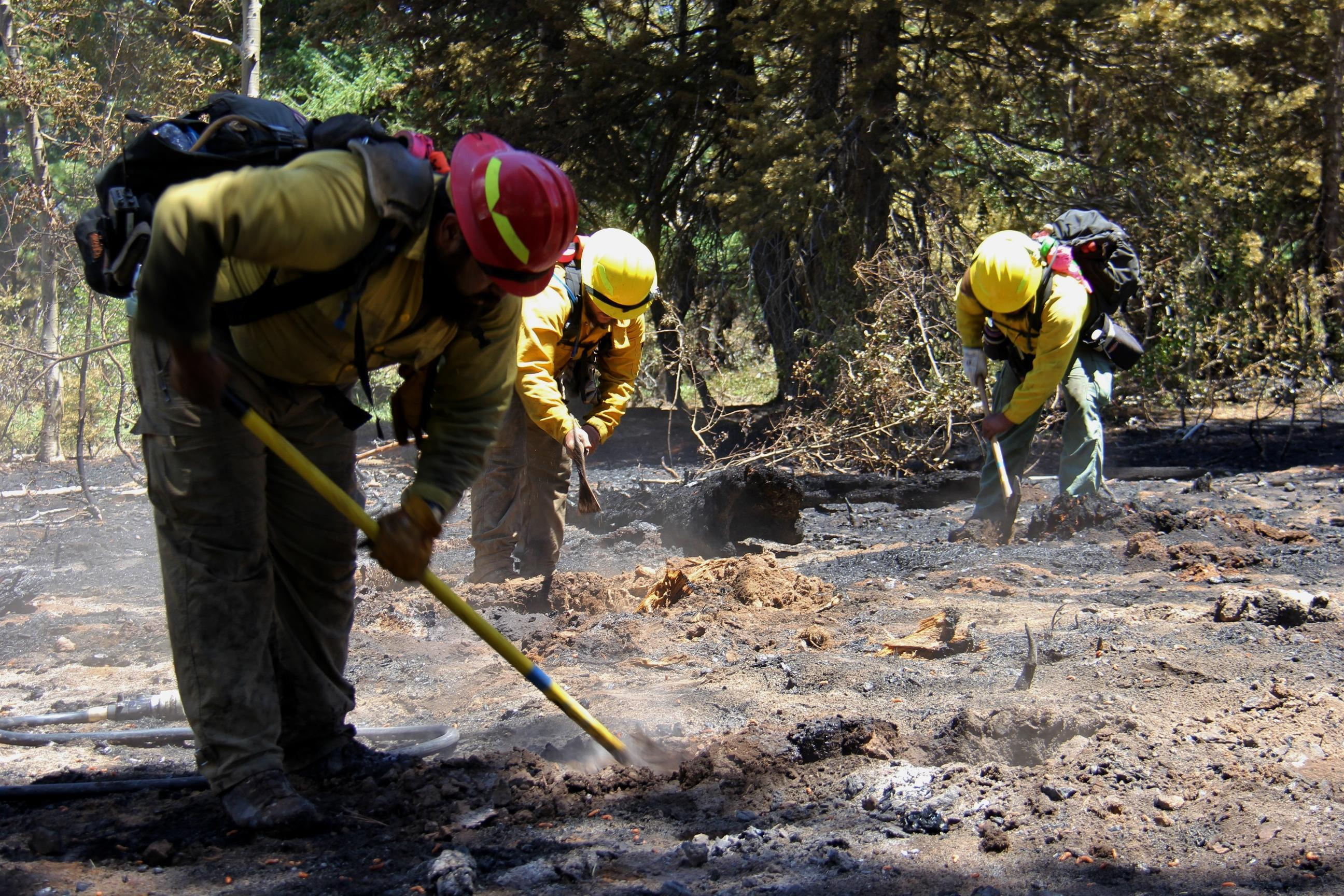
Firefighters conduct mop-up to secure fireline at the Fuller Fire. The Fuller Fire, located on the North Rim of Grand Canyon National Park, began on Jun. 29, 2016, by a lightning strike.

The threat of wildfires does not cease after the flames have passed. It is during this phase that either the burn area exterior or the complete burn area of a fire is cooled so as to not reignite the same fire. Mop-up operations often entail detailed grid searches for hotspots, using lots of water to cool down the burn scar, and continuous monitoring by fire crews and prevention specialists. Fires have been known to reignite due to poor mop-up, most notably the Palisades Fire.

==== Rehabilitation ====
Constructed firelines, breaks, safety zones and other items can all damage soil systems and affect both wildlife and humans. Thinning and burning also must be continued through follow up maintenance, according to the Western Watersheds Project, but this follow-up rarely happens. Forest thinning has brought up concerns that it could increase fire severity, as the sun can reach the lower vegetation and cause additional moisture loss.

===== Surface runoff =====
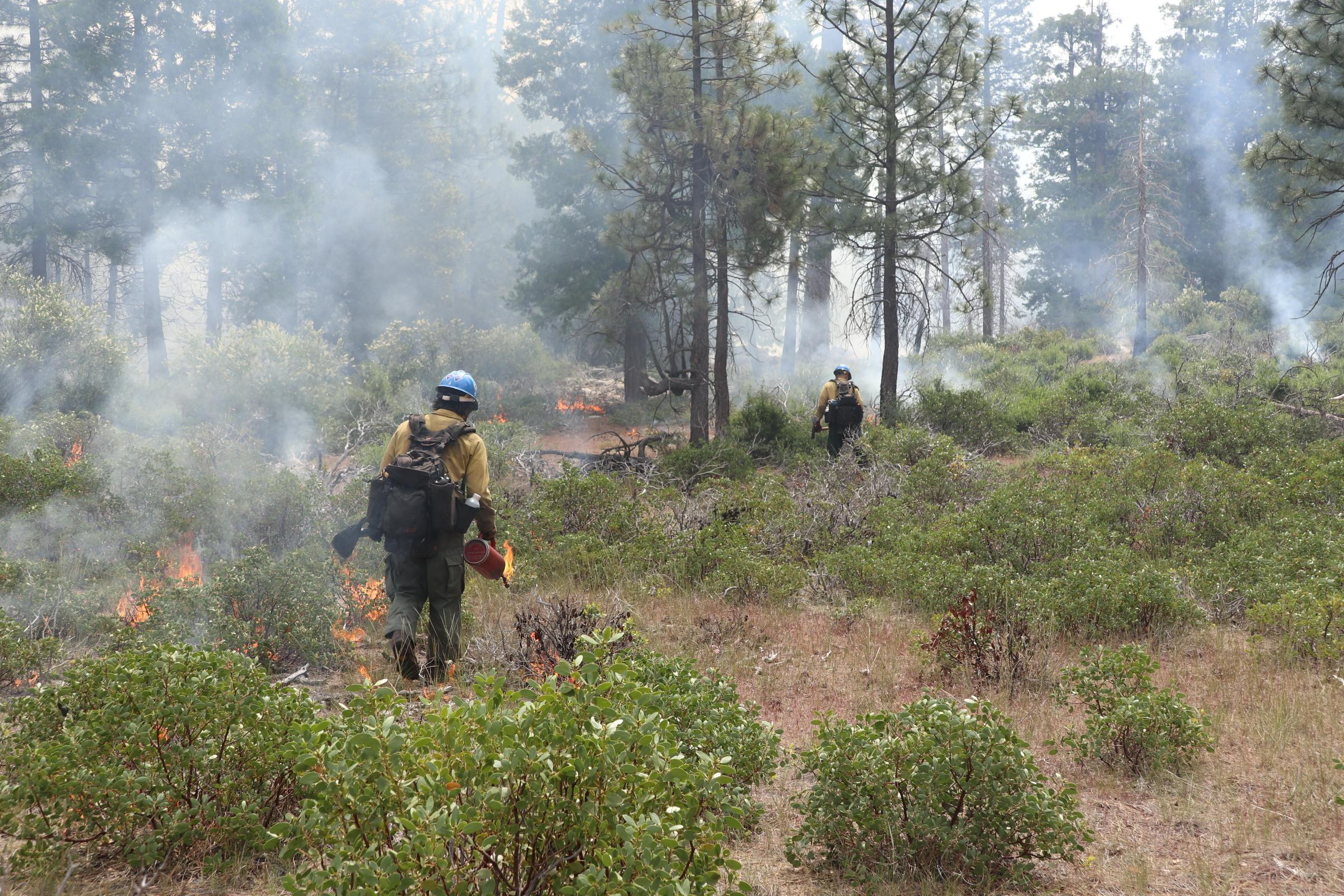
Firefighters use driptorches to perform ignitions on the Cedar Central Prescribed Burn in Cedar Grove, Kings Canyon National Park.

Fireline construction encourages surface run-off and gully formation. Amplified runoff and erosion responses are most likely where fire burns 50-60 percent of fuels and slopes exceed 15 percent. Extensive burnt area promotes accumulation of runoff and formation of a directed flow, capable of transporting a large amount of sediment. In response, land management agencies and volunteers often undertake significant replanting projects near recently burnt wildfires. The loss of plant life from the fire also contributes to erosion.

===== Prescribed burn rehabilitation =====
However, most prescribed burns do not engage in replanting. Prescribed fires are usually intended to reduce fuels, and replanting works against the land management policy. They have been shown to reduce fire intensity, hazards, and smoke pollution significantly. Prescribed fires are monitored similarly to suppressed wildfires, with periodic checks and patrols to make sure that spotfires or slopovers haven't ignited.

=== Incident command ===
Managing any number of resources over varying-size areas in often rugged terrain is extremely challenging. An incident commander (IC) is charged with overall command of an incident.

==== United States ====
Upon arriving to a fire, the incident commander is responsible for ordering additional resources and sizing up the fire. This sizeup provides valuable information to the local dispatch center and helps identify fire potential and intensity. Fires are usually named for a local landmark, such as a road, river, or mountain. In the U.S., "Fire" is part of the name, and is thus capitalized in official government media and wildfire tracking websites.

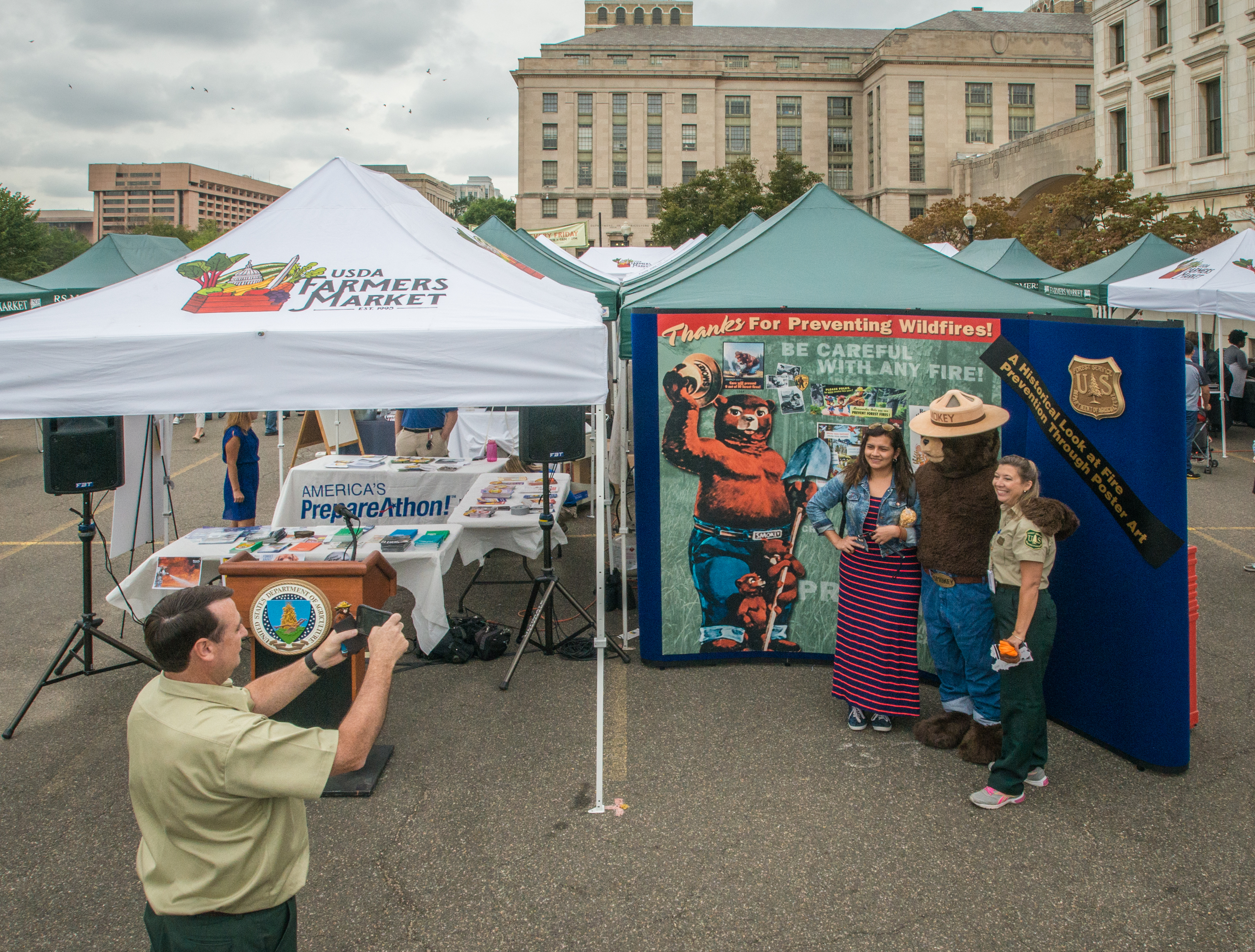
National Preparedness Month with Smokey Bear and Assistant Secretary for Administration, Dr. Parham.

In the U.S., the Incident Command System designates this as being the first on scene providing they have sufficient training. The size of the fire, measured in acres or chains, as well as the complexity of the incident and threats to developed areas, will later dictate the class-level of IC required. Incident management teams aid on larger fire incidents to meet more complex priorities and objectives of the incident commander. It provides support staff to handle duties such as communication, fire behavior modeling, and map- and photo-interpretation. In the U.S., management coordination between fires is primarily done by the National Interagency Fire Center (NIFC).

Specific agencies and different incident management teams may include a number of different individuals with various responsibilities and varying titles. A public information officer (PIO) generally provides fire-related information to the public, for example. Branch chiefs and division chiefs serve as management on branches and divisions, respectively, as the need for these divisions arise. Investigators may be called to ascertain the fire's cause. Prevention officers often patrol their jurisdictional areas to teach fire prevention and potentially prevent some human-caused fires from happening.

===== Fuels =====
Fuel models are specific fuel designations determined by energy burning potential. Placed into 13 classes, they range from "short grass" (model 1) to "logging slash" (model 13). Low-numbered models burn at lower intensities than those at the higher end.

== Concerns in wildland fire ==
=== Fires at the wildland–urban interface ===
Wildfires can pose risks to human settlement in multiple different scenarios and environments. An example can happen at the classic wildland–urban interface, where urban or suburban development borders wilderness. These are typical towns and smaller cities near large patches of land, such as federally protected forests.

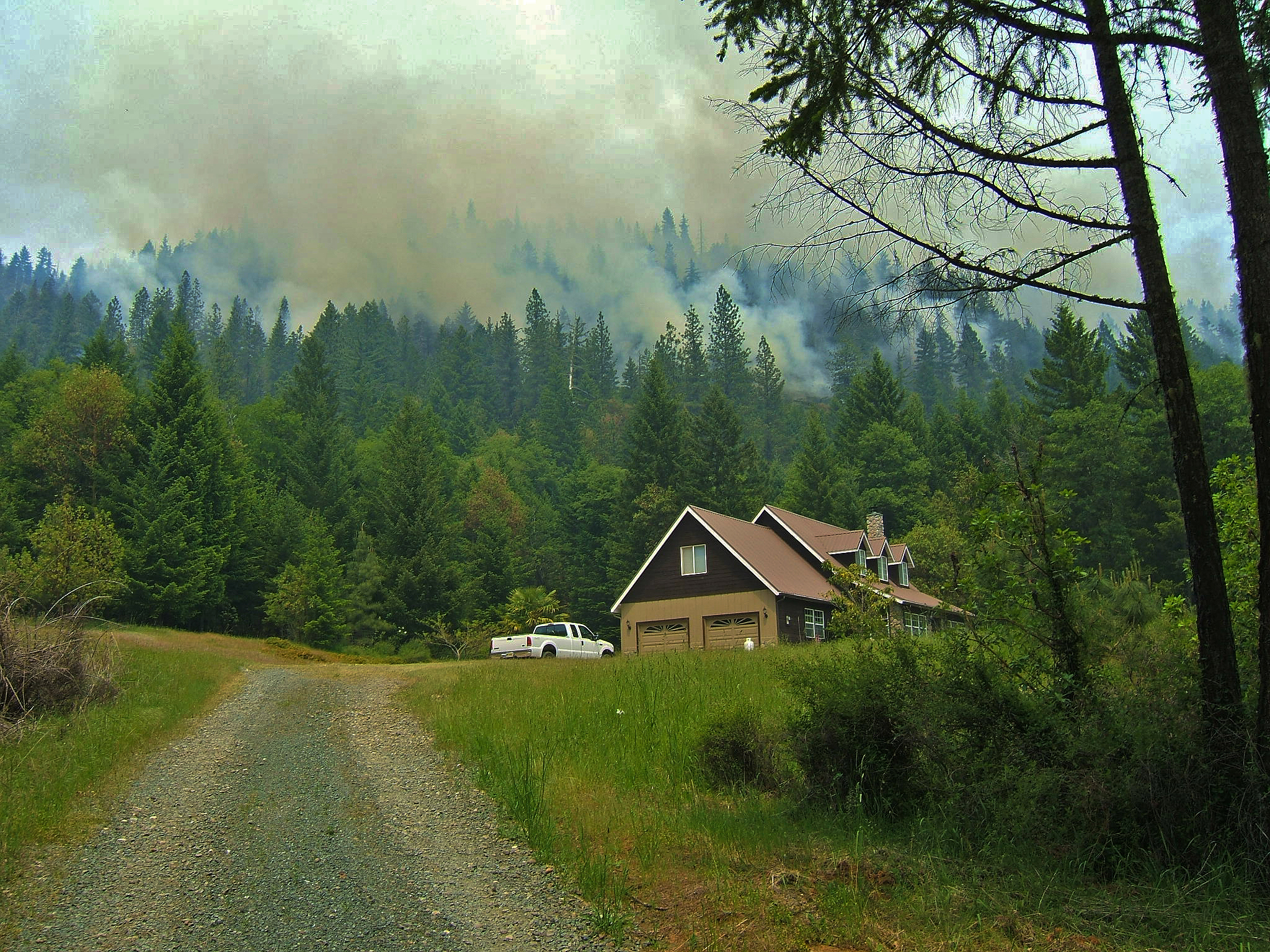
A low-intensity prescribed underburn in the wildland-urban interface, western Oregon. This is a good example of the occluded wildland-urban interface.

Another happens at the mixed wildland–urban interface, where homes or small communities are interspersed throughout a wild area, and the boundary between developed and non-developed land is undefined. At the mixed WUI, homes are scattered in the wilderness and pose less of a threat of spreading to a municipality than endangering the few people that live in these remote areas.

A third possibility occurs in the occluded wildland–urban interface, where pockets of wildland are enclosed within cities. Common examples of these are small brush fires in parks of major cities, such as the fire in Prospect Park in Brooklyn, New York, in 2024.

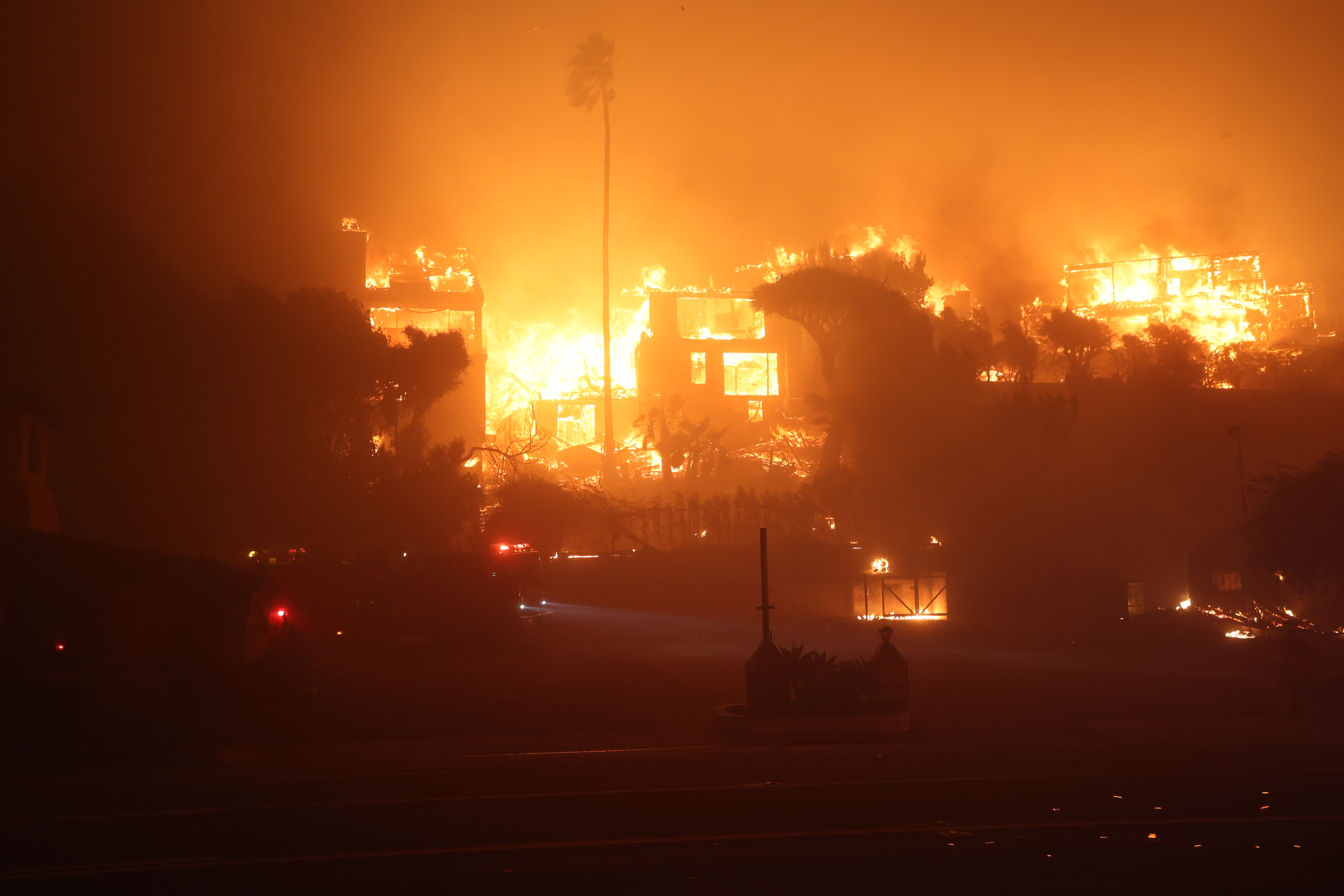
The Palisades Fire burning a structure on January 8, 2025. The Palisades Fire was a highly destructive wildfire that began in the Santa Monica Mountains of Los Angeles County.

Expansive urbanization and other human activity in areas adjacent to wildlands is a primary reason for the catastrophic structural losses experienced in wildfires. Continued development of wildland–urban interface firefighting measures and the rebuilding of structures destroyed by fires has been met with criticism. For example, communities such as Sydney and Melbourne in Australia have been built within highly flammable forest fuels. The city of Cape Town, South Africa, lies on the fringe of the Table Mountain National Park. In the western United States from the 1990s to 2007, over 8.5 million new homes were constructed on the wildland–urban interface.

Fuel buildup can result in costly, devastating fires as more new houses and ranches are built adjacent to wilderness areas. However, the population growth in these fringe areas discourages the use of current fuel management techniques. Smoke from fires is an irritant and a pollutant. Attempts to thin out the fuel load may be met with opposition due to the desirability of forested areas. Wildland goals may be further resisted because of endangered species protections and habitat preservation. The ecological benefit of fire is often overridden by the economic benefits of protecting structures and lives. Additionally, federal policies that cover wildland areas usually differ from local and state policies that govern urban lands.

=== Safety ===
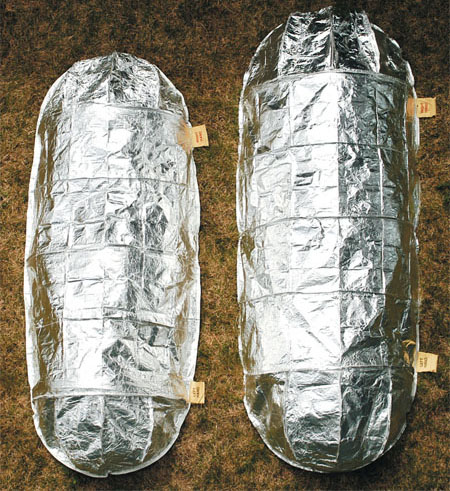
Fire shelters used by wildland firefighters in the United States as a last line of defense when trapped by fires.

Protection of human life is first priority for firefighters. Since 1995, when arriving on a scene, a fire crew will establish safety zones and escape routes, verify communication is in place, and designate lookouts (known in the U.S. by the acronym LCES, for lookouts, communications, escape routes, safety zones). This allows the firefighters to engage a fire with options for a retreat should their current situation become unsafe. Although other safety zones should be designated, areas already burned generally provide a safe refuge from fire provided they have cooled sufficiently, are accessible, and have burned enough fuels so as to not reignite. Briefings may be done to inform new fire resources of hazards and other pertinent information.

==== Entrapment ====
A great emphasis is placed on safety and preventing entrapment, a situation where escape from the fire is impossible. Prevention of this situation is reinforced with two training protocols, Ten Standard Firefighting Orders and Eighteen Watchout Situations, which warn firefighters of potentially dangerous situations, developed in the aftermath of the Mann Gulch fire. As a last resort, many wildland firefighters carry a fire shelter. In an unescapable situation, the shelter will provide limited protection from radiant and convective heat, as well as superheated air. Entrapment within a fire shelter is called a burnover.

In Australia, firefighters rarely carry fire shelters (commonly referred to as "Shake 'N' Bake" shelters); rather, training is given to locate natural shelters or use hand tools to create protection.

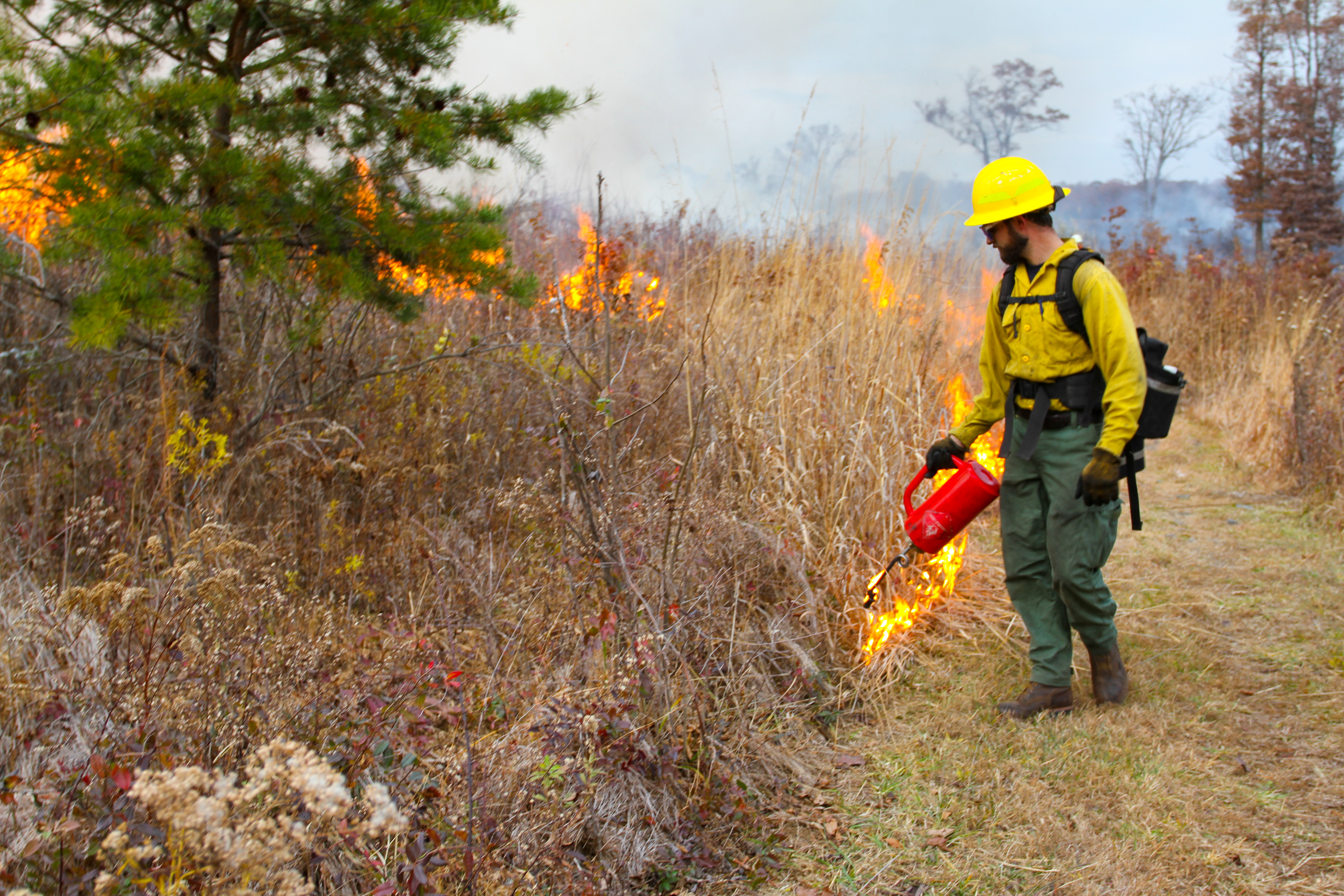
A wildland firefighter uses drip torch at Manassas National Battlefield Park. The helmet, yellow and green Nomex uniform, and pack are crucial pieces of gear for firefighters.

=== Resource protection ===
Resources are ranked according to importance and defensibility. Principal among those factors were accessibility, roof construction, defensible space, and slope of adjoining terrain. Structures can either be held and defended, or evacuated. Buildings that are more susceptible to fire are not defended, due to risk of entrapment and burnover.

=== Ecosystem changes ===
While wildfire suppression focuses more on benefiting human safety and resource protection, the lack of natural fires can lead to various negative ecosystem changes, such as ruining the overall quality of the soil, as can the size of fires when they do occur at a different level than what is recommended for the soil. Across the global grassland and savanna ecosystems, fire suppression is frequently found to be a driver of woody encroachment and poor quality soil, which in return also affects wildlife due to the lack of nutrients.

== Equipment and personnel ==
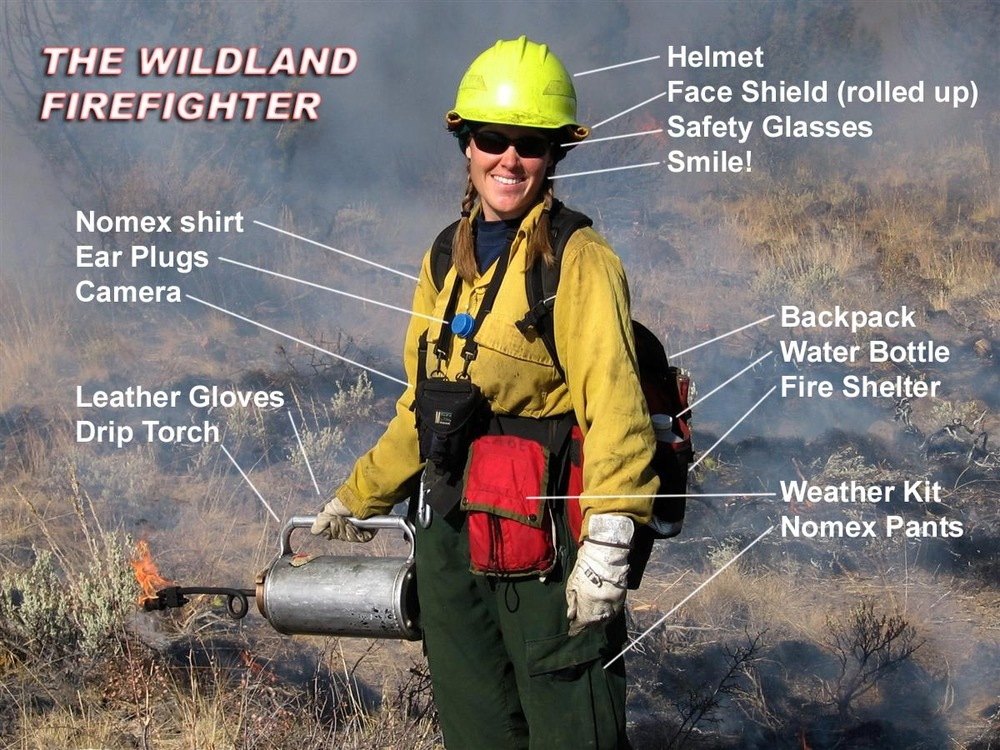
This image shows the standard gear of a wildland firefighter working on a prescribed burn. Not shown is a hand tool, such as a Pulaski.

=== Personal protective equipment ===
Personal safety is also vital to wildland firefighting. The proper use of personal protective equipment (PPE) and firefighting equipment helps minimize accidents. At the very minimum, wildland firefighters should have proper fire-resistant clothing (such as Nomex), protective headgear, wildland firefighting-specific boots, gloves, water for hydration, fire shelters, eye protection, and some form of communication (most commonly a radio).

=== Personnel ===
Wildland firefighters use an array of equipment and specially trained personnel to combat wildfires. The U.S. and several other countries have established dedicated crews, such as handcrews, wildland fire modules, engine crews, helitack crews, smokejumpers, a large assortment of aviation, and heavy equipment support.

Wildland crews are also in remote conditions, requiring a sophisticated and efficient supply mechanism. The U.S. National Interagency Fire Center maintains ties with several countries to supply personnel and equipment in case of large fires. The NIFC operates 15 supply caches around the U.S.

== See also ==
- List of wildfires
- Fire ecology
- Glossary of wildland fire terms
- International Association of Wildland Fire
- National Fire Danger Rating System
