= Fire shelter =

Fire safety device in wildland firefighting

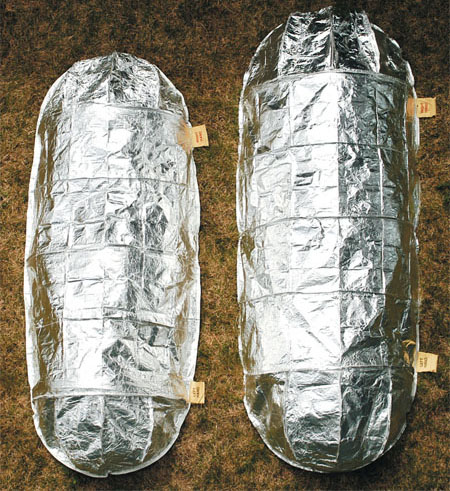
US federal government-issue fire shelters in the deployed state

A fire shelter is a safety device of last resort used by wildland firefighters when trapped by wildfires. While such a shelter cannot withstand sustained contact with flames, it can protect a firefighter's life in a short-lived grass fire. Furthermore, it is designed to reflect radiant heat, protect against convective heat, and trap breathable air — most firefighters' deaths are from inhaling hot gases — so that firefighters can survive in non-burning areas surrounded by intense fire for more than an hour.

First required in the United States in 1977, fire shelters are constructed layers of aluminum foil, woven silica, and fiberglass. When deployed, its maximum dimensions are 86 in × 15.5 in × 31 in (218 cm × 39 cm × 79 cm) and has a shape like a mound. When the shelter is packed into its carrying case, its dimensions are 8.5 in × 5.5 in × 4 in (22 cm × 14 cm × 10 cm). The new-generation fire shelter was developed in 2002 to replace the old style fire shelter which is shaped like a pup-tent and has a carrying case. Its dimensions are smaller than that of the old-generation shelter, now weighing approximately 4.4 pounds (2.0 kg).

The first known use of a fire shelter was in 1804, when a boy was saved from a prairie fire when his mother covered him with a fresh bison hide. William Clark noted in his journal that the fire did not burn the grass around the boy. In the United States fire shelters began being used by wildland firefighters during the late 1960s and have proven extremely effective. In more than 1,300 uses through 2022 only 41 deaths had occurred.

== See also ==
- Beta cloth – Fireproof textile
