= Wildland fire module =

Fire-fighting team

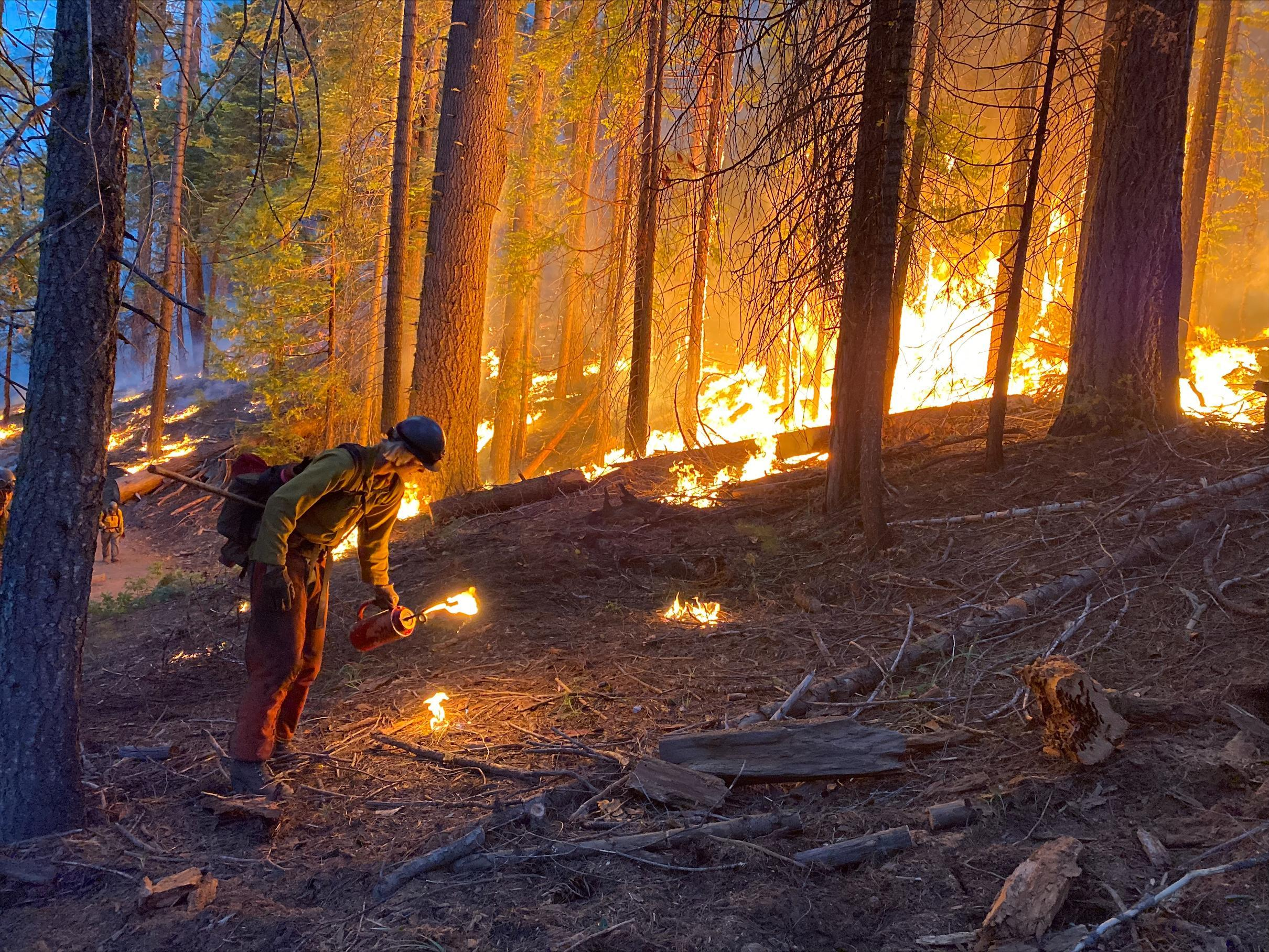
A firefighter from Yosemite National Parks Wildland Fire Module Crew 1 uses a drip torch to back burn on an initial attack.

A wildland fire module (WFM), formerly fire use module (FUM), is a 7–10 person team of firefighting personnel dedicated to planning, monitoring and starting fires. They may be deployed anywhere in the United States for resource benefits (fire use), prescribed fire and hazard fuel reduction projects.

As interagency national resource personnel, wildland fire modules have expertise in the areas of fire monitoring, ignition, holding and suppression, prescribed fire preparation and implementation support, hazard fuels reduction, and fire effects monitoring.

Wildland fire modules are funded by different US government agencies including the National Park Service, U.S. Forest Service, and the Bureau of Land Management. The Nature Conservancy is the sole non-government entity to sponsor and support a wildland fire module.

== History ==
In 1995, the National Park Service (NPS) founded several FUMs and hosted them in five different park units across the United States: Bandelier NM, Saguaro NP, Whiskeytown-Shasta-Trinity NRA, Zion NP, and Yellowstone NP. In 1999, the NPS created four more modules: Black Hills FUM, Cumberland Gap FUM, Great Smokes FUM, and Buffalo River FUM.

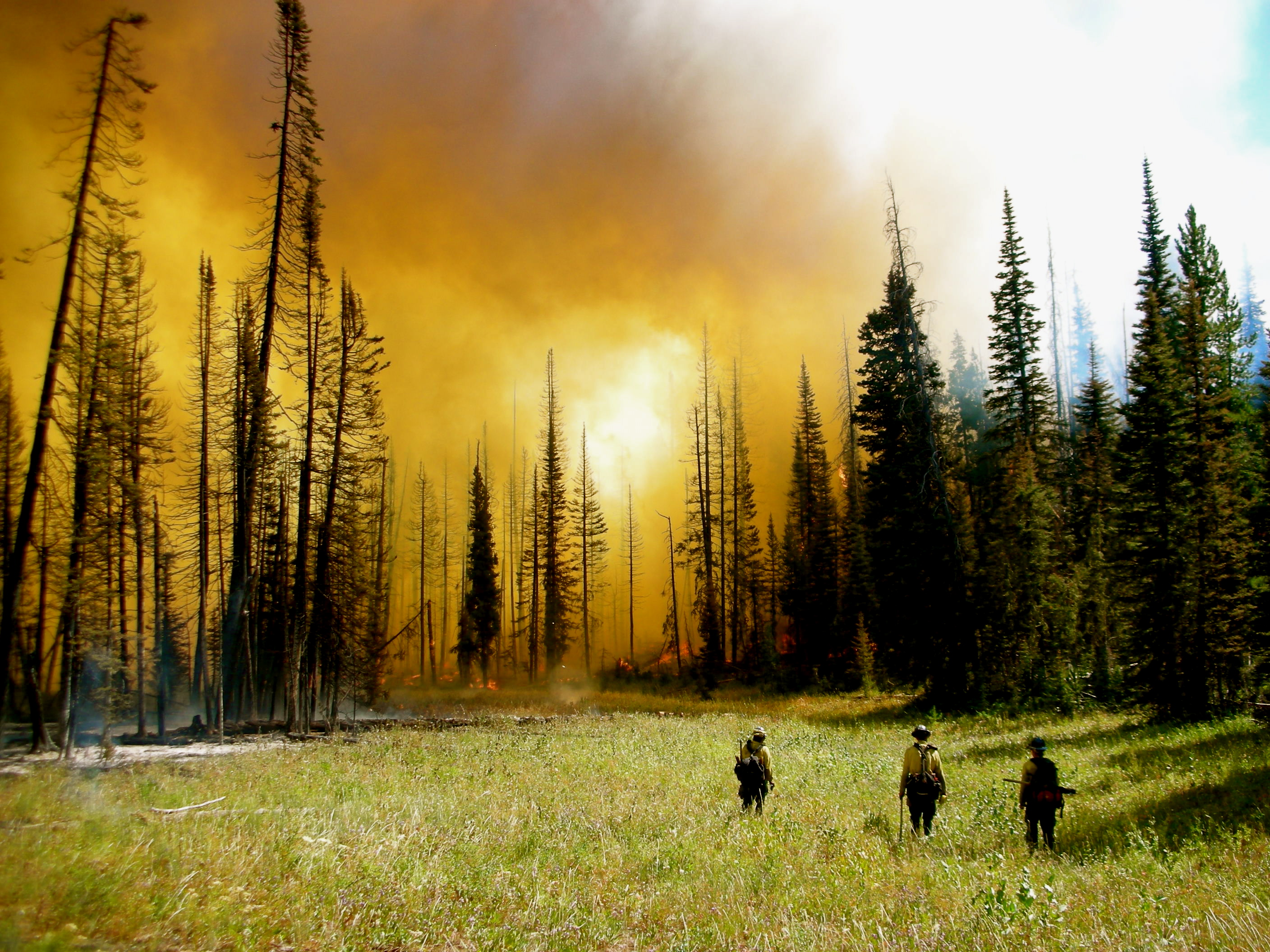
King's Peak Wildland Fire Module working on the Willow Fire on the Caribou-Targhee National Forest. The crew is taking fire behavior observations from the safety of a meadow.

The modules were developed with the primary purpose of assisting the National Park units with fire use (wildland fire and prescribed fire). Secondarily, the modules were intended to be used in monitoring fire effects, and manually reducing hazard fuels on various park units. Modules were also anticipated to be used to assist other agencies in fire use and fuels treatment projects when all the park unit objectives were met.

Other modules came into existence as the use and flexibility of fire use modules became more apparent. The most notable of these wildland fire modules includes ones stationed on the Stanislaus National Forest, Ashley National Forest, and The Nature Conservancy's Southern Rockies.

Since 2005, the U.S. Forest Service has also implemented the use of wildland fire modules throughout the country. As of 2025, there are 69 wildland fire modules in the United States. These modules are highly qualified and effective in a variety of fire ground operations ranging from basic suppression to extremely accurate fire behavior analysis and other tactical predictive services.

== Configurations ==
A typical module consists of the following positions:

- (1) Module Supervisor – GS-8/9 permanent full-time
- (1) Assistant Supervisor – GS-7/8 permanent full-time
- (2) Lead Crewmember (Squad Leader) – GS-5/6/7 subject-to-furlough and permanent full-time
- (3–6) Crewmembers – GS 3/4/5 temporary, subject-to-furlough, and permanent full-time

Type 2 wildland fire module	Type 1 wildland fire module
(1) Crew or Engine Boss (CRWB/ENGB)	(2) Crew or Engine Boss (CRWB/ENGB)
(1) FIRB – Firing Boss	(1) Task Force Leader (TFLD)
(2) ICT5 – Incident Commander Type 5	(1) Prescribed Fire Burn Boss II (RXB2)
(1) FEMO – Fire Effects Monitor	(2) FIRB – Firing Boss
(3) FFT1 – Firefighter Type 1	(1) ICT4 – Incident Commander Type 4
(2) FAL2 – Intermediate Faller	(2) ICT5 – Incident Commander Type 5
(1) HECM – Helicopter Crewmember	(2) FEMO – Fire Effects Monitor
	(4) FFT1 – Firefighter Type 1
	(2) FAL2 – Intermediate Faller
	(1) HECM – Helicopter Crewmember
	(1) Fire Observer (FOBS)

== Fitness standards ==
As a part of fire line performance required of WFMs, the physical ability to perform arduous labor is critical to module morale, personal health and safety standards. All WFM personnel strive to meet the following goals:

- 1.5-mile run in a time of 11 minutes or less
- 45 sit-ups in 60 seconds
- 25 pushups in 60 seconds
- 7 pull-ups

== See also ==
- Controlled burn
- Hotshot Crew
- Smokejumper
- Helitack
- Wildland fire engine
- Wildland fire tender
- Glossary of wildland fire terms
- Wildland fire suppression
