= Loop Fire =

1966 wildfire in Southern California

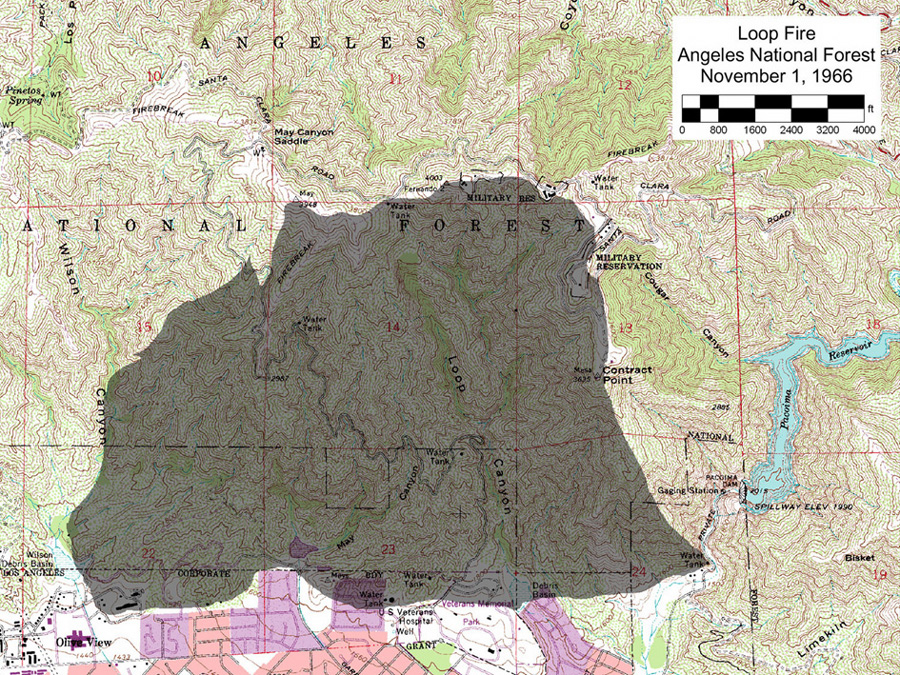
- Map of the footprint of the Loop Fire
- Date: November 1, 1966 –
- Location: Los Angeles County, Southern California, United States

Impacts
- Deaths: 12

Ignition
- Cause: Faulty electrical line

The Loop Fire was a wildfire in Angeles National Forest, above Sylmar, California. The El Cariso Interagency Hotshot Crew was constructing fireline downhill into a chimney canyon and was within 200 feet of completing their assignment when a sudden shift of winds caused a spot fire directly below where they were working. Within seconds flames raced uphill, engulfing the firefighters in temperatures estimated to reach 2500 degrees. The fire flashed through the 2,200 foot long chimney canyon in less than one minute, catching the crew while they attempted to reach their safety zones.

Ten members of the crew died on the Loop Fire that day. Another two members died from burn injuries in the following days. Most of the 19 El Cariso crew members who survived were critically burned and remained hospitalized for some time. The Downhill Indirect Line Construction Checklist, which improved firefighting equipment and better fire behavior training, resulted in part, from lives lost on this fire.

== Background ==
On November 1, 1966, the El Cariso Hotshots, a U.S. Forest Service Interregional wildland firefighting hotshot crew, was trapped by flames as they worked on a steep hillside in Pacoima Canyon on the Angeles National Forest. An unanticipated upslope wind came up in the afternoon and a spot fire was fanned and funneled up the steep canyon.

== Fire origin ==
The Loop Fire started at 05:19 on November 1, 1966, from a faulty electrical line at the U.S. Army's Los Pinetos Nike Missile Site. This facility is approximately 1 mile north of Contract Point. The fire burned downhill in a southwesterly direction under the influence of 40 to 60 mile per hour Santa Ana winds. Contract Point was a key anchor point on this east flank of the fire, which was designated as Division A. Suppression efforts in Division A on the morning of November 1 were focused on protecting the missile facility and establishing a control line south from that facility toward Contract Point.

== Incident ==
By mid-day the north flank of the fire had been contained along the Santa Clara Fuelbreak up to Contract Point. With the exception of a few minor slop-overs, the east flank of the fire was holding along the ridge to a point 40 chains south of Contract Point (Stand 3). The Chilao Hotshot Crew, two Los Angeles County crews, and several engines were working a large slop-over near Contract Point. At 12:00 the Dalton Hotshot Crew on-scene at Contract Point and were assigned by Division Boss William Westmoreland to build direct handline south from the Chilao crew along this east flank of the fire. At about 13:00 the Del Rosa Hotshot Crew arrived and Westmoreland directed them to work down the ridge ahead of the Dalton Crew. At 14:30 the El Cariso Hotshot Crew arrived on-scene. Line Boss Hugh Masterson briefed El Cariso Superintendent Gordon King. Masterson's instructions were to "leap-frog the Del Rosa crew and to cold-trail the fire edge if possible". He also mentioned that "the main ridge could be used as an alternate if impossible to follow the burned edge."

El Cariso Superintendent King led his crew to a small bench below this south point of the ridge and held them there until he could determine if it was possible to cold-trail the fire edge all the way down. King could see the Los Angeles County dozers and crews working the lower edge of the fire and believed he could tie in with them. At about 14:45 Line Boss Masterson requested Division Boss Westmoreland to go down the east flank and make sure the crews were lined out. Westmoreland had a radio and several of the crews did not have radios, including the El Cariso Hotshots. By the time Westmoreland reached the tail end of the El Cariso crew, King had led the first units of his crew well down into the steep rocky chimney staying directly on the fire edge. As a result, King never had a radio exchange or face-to-face meeting with Westmoreland, who was his Division Boss.

By about 15:30, the El Cariso Hotshots were fully committed, cold-trailing their way down through the steep rocky chimney canyon with Superintendent King and the lead elements of the crew just starting to approach this point. Division Boss Westmoreland had followed them about halfway down and observed minimal fire activity, but he also stated that it was not a clean burn.

At about this same time line construction by the Los Angeles County dozer and crews, that were working west along the bottom of the slope, was halted by a deep gully. This gully was adjacent to and just below the chimney canyon that the El Cariso crew was working down. There was no radio communication capability between the two groups, but they did have visual contact. Independently, both were trying to figure out how best to tie in the line. At this point, there was no more than 500 feet separating them.

Several individuals, who were working at the bottom of the fire, stated that the fire behavior was in a static situation with hot spots near the bottom of the gully and that there were favorable southeast winds. In addition, a helicopter was making water drops on the hotspots. According to these same observers, sometime between 15:35 and 15:45 the fire started to cross the bottom of the gully. Within the next 5 to 10 minutes the fire crossed the gully, made a run upslope to the bottom of the chimney, and then flashed very quickly up the length of the chimney. The steep rocky terrain made it very difficult for firefighters to move toward the previously burned area. Terrain conditions combined with the rapid fire spread resulted in all members of the El Cariso Hotshot Crew being burned over as they worked from this stand location and up several hundred yards in the chimney above.

== Gallery ==
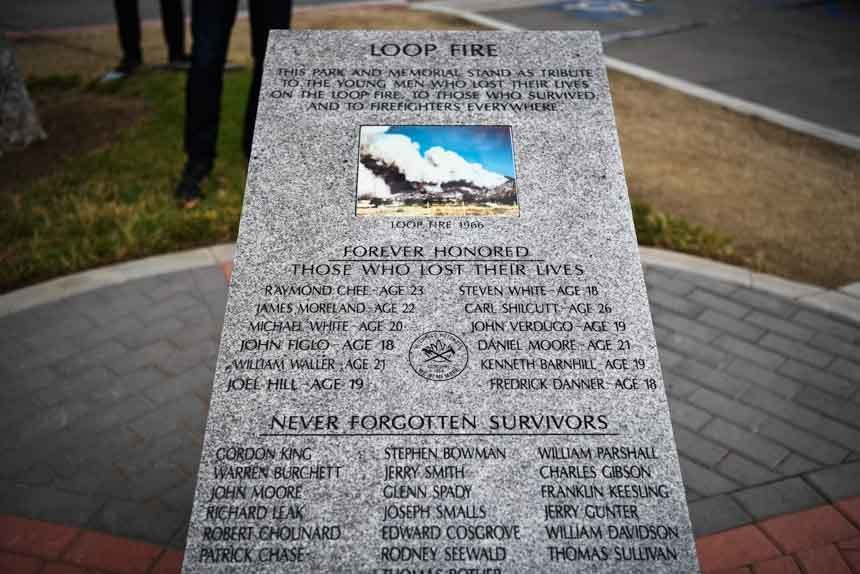
Placard at El Cariso Regional Park installed in 1996.

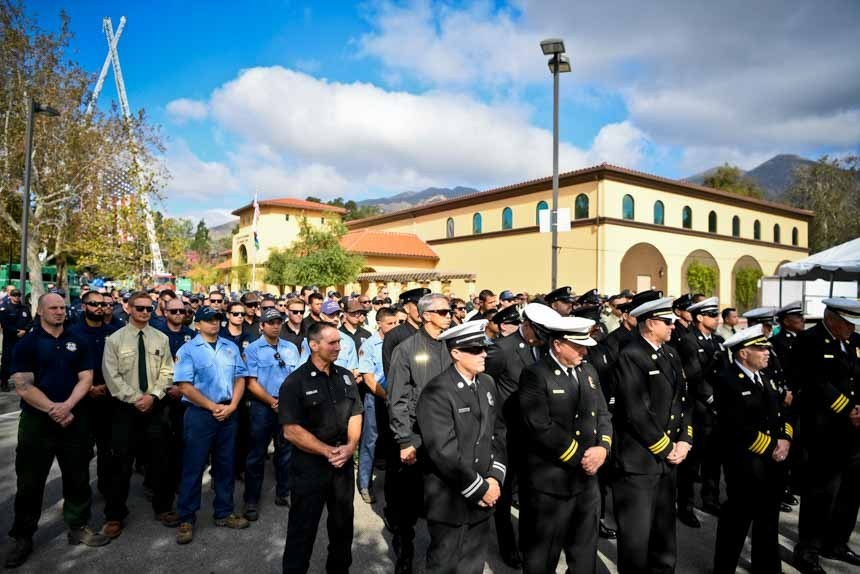
Firefighters attending the 50th anniversary event

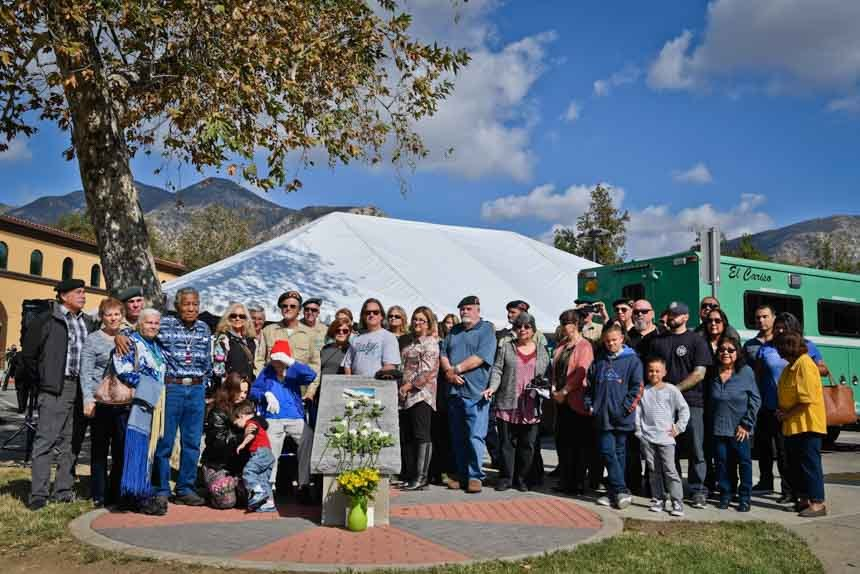
Family members attending the 50th anniversary event

Official US Forest Service Loop fire tragedy report

1966 El Cariso Hotshots Crew 1 - October 1966

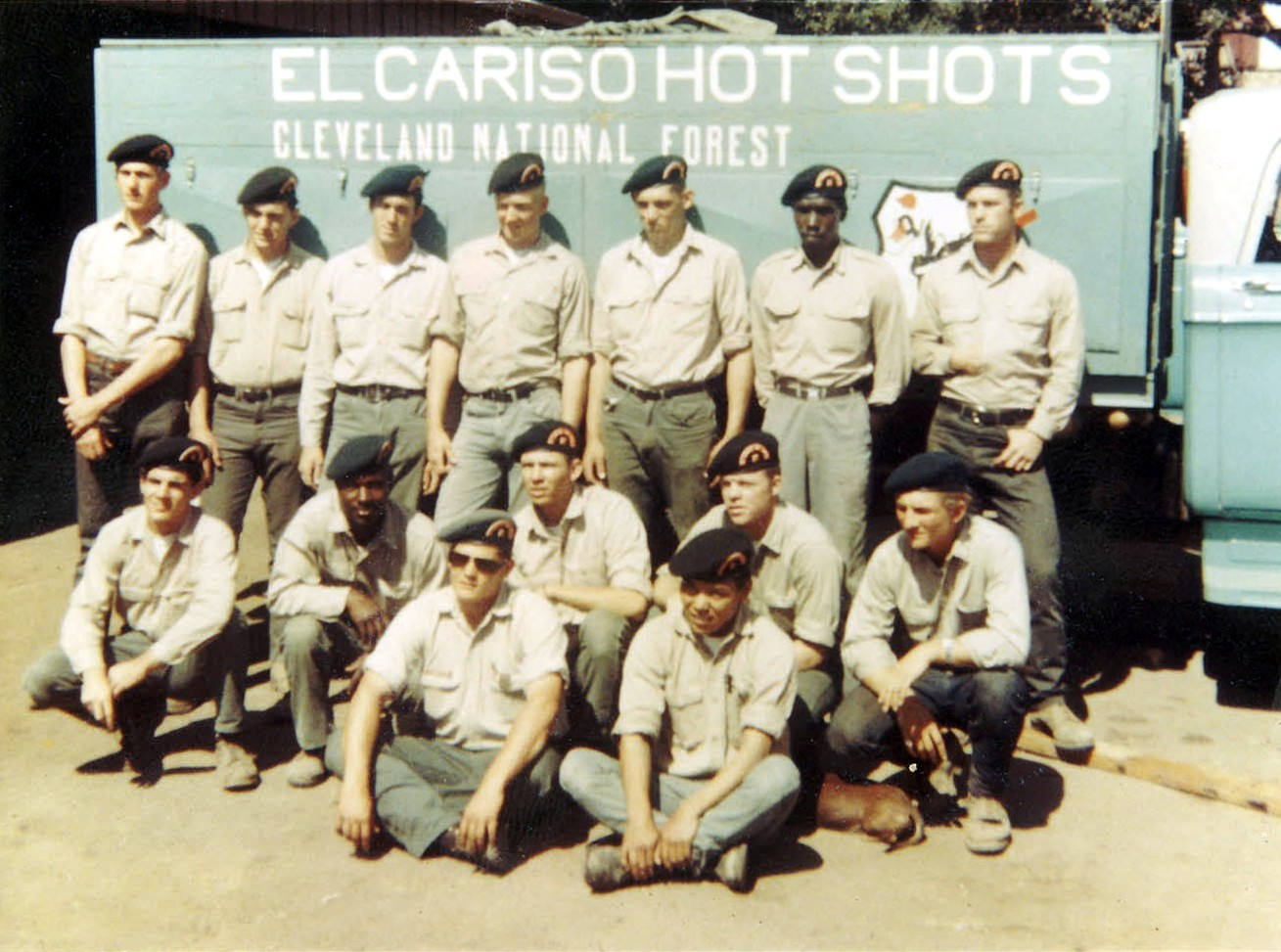
1966 El Cariso Hotshots Crew 2 - October 1966

Newspaper article featuring Loop Fire survivors Ed Cosgrove and Jerry Smith

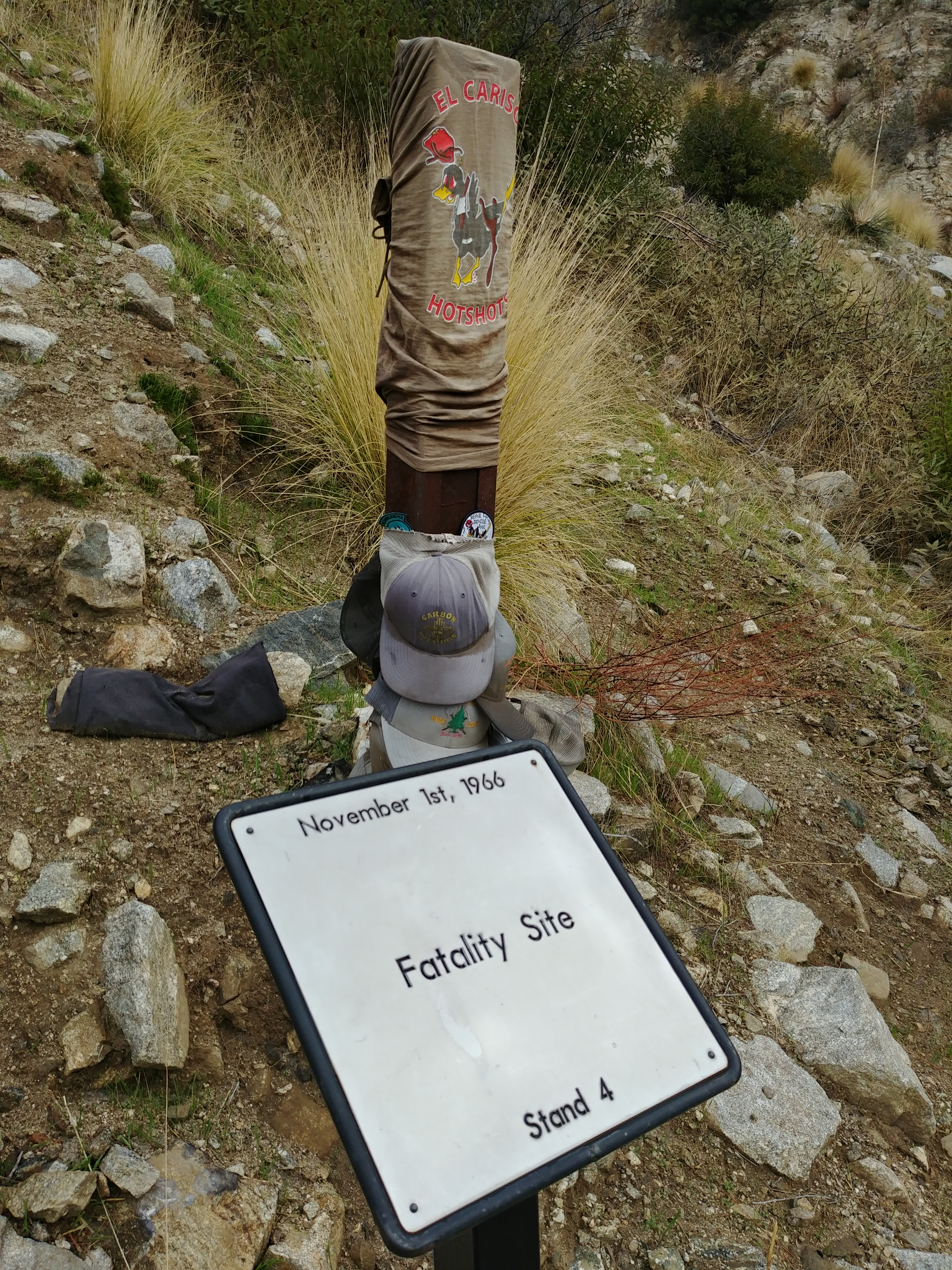
Marker at the fatality site.
