= Fire on the Mountain (Maclean book) =

1999 book by John N. Maclean

- Author: John N. Maclean
- Language: English
- Genre: Non-fiction
- Publication date: 1999
- Publication place: United States
- ISBN: 0061829617

Fire on the Mountain (ISBN 0061829617) is a 1999 non-fiction book by John N. Maclean that describes the most famous wildland fire of the late 20th century. The book describes the events and aftermath of the South Canyon Fire on Storm King Mountain on July 6, 1994, in Colorado, which took the lives of 14 firefighters. Those who died included nine members of the Prineville (Oregon) Hotshots: Kathi Beck, Tami Bickett, Scott Blecha, Levi Brinkley, Doug Dunbar, Terri Hagen, Bonnie Holtby, Rob Johnson, and Jon Kelso, along with a Missoula Smokejumper, Don Mackey, two McCall (Idaho) Smokejumpers, Roger Roth and James Thrash, and two members of a Helitack crew, Richard Tyler and Rob Browning. Fire on the Mountain, won the Mountain and Plains Booksellers award as the best non-fiction book of 1999. It was made into an eponymous two-hour documentary by the History Channel that was a finalist for an Emmy award and won the Cine Master's Award as the best documentary of 1999.

== Related ==
John N. Maclean's father Norman Maclean wrote the 1992 book Young Men and Fire that told a very similar story about the Mann Gulch Fire of August 1949 and the 13 men who died there. The fire occurred in Mann Gulch in the Gates of the Mountains Wilderness.
