= Young Men and Fire =

1992 non-fiction book by Norman Maclean

- First edition
- Author: Norman Maclean
- Language: English
- Subject: Wildfire
- Genre: Non-fiction, Memoir
- Publisher: University of Chicago Press
- Publication date: 1992
- Publication place: United States
- Pages: 316
- ISBN: 0-226-50062-4
- OCLC: 59946699

Young Men and Fire is a 1992 non-fiction book written by Norman Maclean. It is Maclean's story of his quest to understand the Mann Gulch fire of 1949 in Montana's Gates of the Mountains Wilderness, and how it led to the deaths of 13 wildland firefighters, 12 of them members of the USFS Smokejumpers. The book was a national bestseller and won the 1992 National Book Critics Circle Award for General Nonfiction.

== Synopsis ==
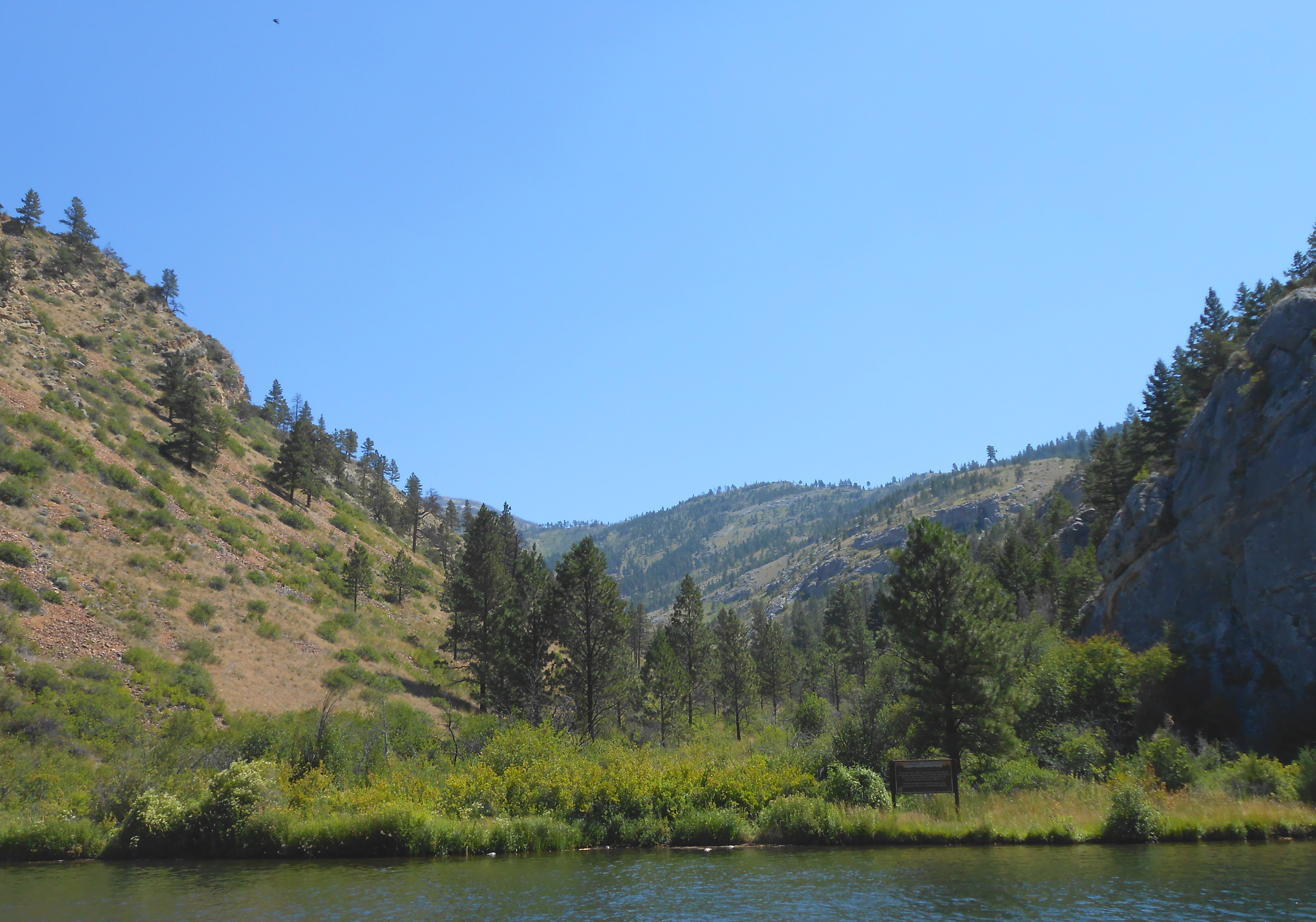
Mann Gulch, Helena National Forest

Young Men and Fire is structured in three parts. In part 1, Maclean gives a minute-by-minute account of the unusual "blowup" that trapped the Smokejumpers in Mann Gulch. Part 2 tells of Maclean's attempt to find meaning in the disaster by understanding the Smokejumpers' decisions and the fire's behavior: "If there is a story in Mann Gulch", he writes near the beginning of part 2, "it will take something of a storyteller to find it."

Central to the book is the decision by the Smokejumpers' foreman R. Wagner "Wag" Dodge to light an "escape fire" ahead of the main fire that his men were trying to outrun. Dodge survived by lying down in the ashes of his fire as the main fire passed over him. Maclean set out to learn whether some of the Smokejumpers were killed or cut off by Dodge's fire, as some of their families alleged. In part 2, Maclean returns to Mann Gulch with the two living survivors of the fire and his research assistant Laird Robinson, himself a former Smokejumper. From his observations in Mann Gulch, the testimony of witnesses, the research of fire scientists, and his imaginative reconstruction of the dead Smokejumpers' final moments, Maclean attempts to answer the question of Dodge's culpability and, more broadly, to give the Mann Gulch catastrophe the shape and consolation of tragedy. Part 3 is a short coda that one critic describes as "an imaginative funeral service and benediction".

Maclean and Robinson, in their attempt to forensically analyze the Mann Gulch Fire, bring together multiple sources, including the official report of the United States Forest Service of the fire, the testimony of the three men who fought the fire and lived, and the research and report of Robert Jansson and Harry T. Gisborne (who would suffer a fatal heart attack at Mann Gulch two months later trying to get to the bottom of the tragedy). On the day of the fire, Jansson was ranger on duty of the Helena National Forest's Canyon Ferry District, the area that included Mann Gulch. Maclean and Robinson also take Walter Rumsey and Robert Sallee, the only two living survivors of the fire team (as survivor Wag Dodge died in 1955), back to the scene of the fire in 1978, hoping that walking the ground again would help solve some of the missing pieces. Additionally, Maclean and Robinson use the modern Fire Lab and their mathematical analysis (advances in fire methodology not available in 1949), to search for answers to the fire.

With all of these pieces, several trips to Mann Gulch, and ideas exchanged between Bud Moore, Ed Heilman, Richard Rothermel, Frank Albini, and other members of the U.S. Forest Service forest fire investigators, Maclean and Robinson come to new conclusions on the fire's behavior: that the wind went in the opposite direction than was originally thought possible, and once the fire got started, it created its own unique weather system (which few thought possible before this research).

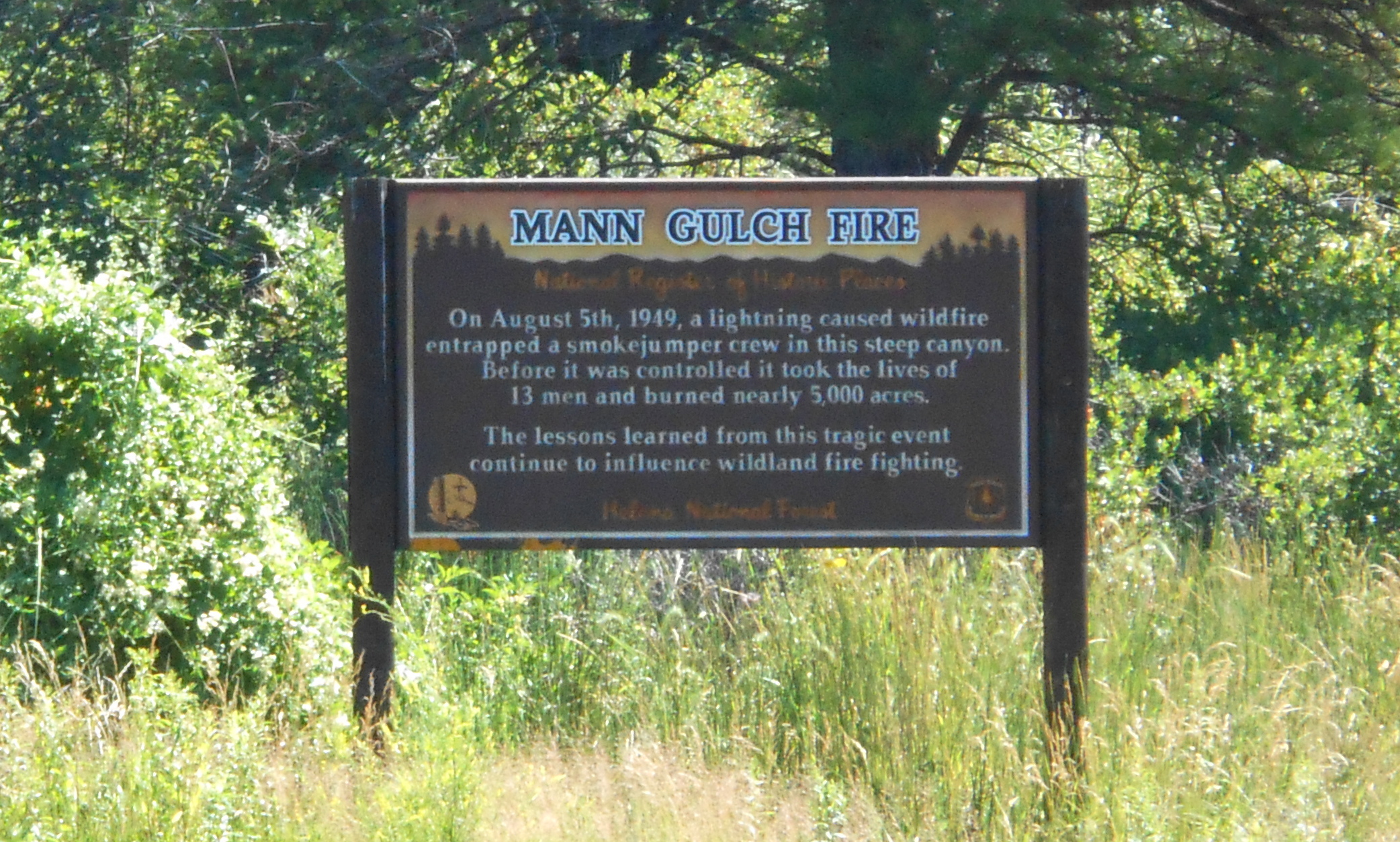
Mann Gulch fire commemorative sign

It was always assumed that the wind was traveling south, or upstream, on the Missouri River at that time of day. Instead, they proved that the wind was traveling north, or downriver, and that the top of the ridge (which juts out as the river bends sharply to the northwest and separates Mann Gulch and Meriwether Canyon) split this downriver wind in two. These two separate smaller winds then re-converged (on the other side of the ridge) in the heart of the gulch (at right angles). This convergence combined with massive heat, produced by the fire and the hot August afternoon.

Additionally, the vegetation pattern played a part in how the fire developed and took the lives of the men. The south side of the gulch was of the mountains, with taller forested trees, but the north side of the gulch was of the plains, with smaller trees and dense grasses. This combination of contrasting vegetation, heat, air currents, and right-angle winds, would cause the fire to change direction instantly, trapping and killing most of the fire fighters in its path.

By the end of their investigation, Maclean and Robinson conclude that Dodge's escape fire was not culpable in the Smokejumpers' deaths.

Much of Young Men and Fire also concerns several of the individual Smokejumpers who parachuted into Mann Gulch that day, among them Henry J. Thol, Jr., who ran the furthest; Joseph B. Sylvia, whom foreman Dodge found sitting on a rock after the fire passed, soon to die of his burns; Eldon E. Diettert, the youngest, who died on his nineteenth birthday; and the three who survived the fire: Dodge, Sallee, and Rumsey.

== Themes and genre ==
Maclean started writing Young Men and Fire in his seventy-fourth year and alludes frequently in the book to his age, both as a motivation and as a difficulty. The Publisher's Note prefacing the book states that "Young Men and Fire was where, near the end, all the lives he had lived would merge: the lives of a woodsman, firefighter, scholar, teacher, and storyteller." On the book's penultimate page, Maclean writes, "I, an old man, have written this fire report. Among other things, it was important to me, as an exercise of old age, to enlarge my knowledge and spirit so I could accompany young men whose lives I might have lived on their way to death."

The book tells the story of an initially routine-seeming fire in which a combination of individually unlikely developments create an inferno in which most of the smokejumpers are killed. In doing so, it presents themes of fate, misjudgment, and fickle circumstances.

In his introduction to The Norman Maclean Reader, O. Alan Weltzien says that Young Men and Fire's achievement "rests in the insistent way Maclean approaches, closely and personally, the unknowable: the final minutes and seconds when the Smokejumpers are running for their lives as the towering, suffering inferno overtakes them. More generally, it rests in the way Maclean concedes and makes a theme of his uncertainty and doubt in the face of unrecoverable history."

A recurring theme in the book is Maclean's wish to give a shape to the Mann Gulch disaster. In his foreword to the 25th anniversary edition of Young Men and Fire, author Timothy Egan describes Maclean as "trying to shape, or at least to see, art in tragedy while acknowledging that 'tragedy is the most demanding of all literary forms.'" Reviewer John Ottenhoff notes in The Christian Century that "As in King Lear, about which Maclean had written eloquently in his career at the University of Chicago, death informs life, and compassion redeems pointless deaths." Literary scholar Lindsay Atnip argues that for Maclean to create tragedy out of catastrophe "amounts not just to explaining why things went terribly wrong, but also seeing in the catastrophe an intimation of certain hidden or unacknowledged conditions of human life".

Young Men and Fire has been called a nonfiction novel. Reviewing the Young Men and Fire in the Times Literary Supplement, Roger Just called it "extremely difficult to classify: 'a true story of the Mann Gulch Fire' as the cover proclaims; but also a detective story; also a semi-scientific treatise on forest fires; also an autobiography of a man's closing years; also the summation of a career in which life and literature meld." In the Washington Post Book World, reviewer Dennis Drabelle called Young Men and Fire "worthy of comparison to the masterpiece in its genre, Truman Capote's In Cold Blood". In USA Today, reviewer Timothy Foote compared the book to James Agee's Let Us Now Praise Famous Men.

== Publication and reception ==
Maclean stopped working on Young Men and Fire in 1987 due to ill health and left it unfinished at the time of his death in 1990. After his death, Maclean's children John N. Maclean and Jean Maclean Snyder brought the manuscript to the University of Chicago Press, publishers of Maclean's A River Runs through It and Other Stories. It was edited for publication by Alan Thomas of the University of Chicago Press with advice from William Kittredge, Wayne C. Booth, John N. Maclean, and Jean Maclean Snyder. Thomas worked on it exclusively for months in the summer of 1991 while living in Saitama, Japan, distracted only by "the idiot barking of the landlady’s two miniature collies." The editing focused on repetition, inconsistencies, and fact-checking, and shortened the work by about 15%. The words remained Maclean's. "Black Ghost", a story about Maclean visiting the still-burning Mann Gulch fire about a week after the blow-up, was not part of Maclean's manuscript but was added by the publisher as "a fitting prelude". A reviewer would later characterize "Black Ghost" as a "Shakespearean 'argument', or overture", that "contains all the elements of forest fire in general and Mann Gulch in particular". The book was published with a selection of photographs, including two by Peter Stackpole that originally appeared in an August 22, 1949, Life magazine feature on the Mann Gulch Fire.

Young Men and Fire received strong pre-publication reviews in Kirkus and Booklist. Upon publication, the book was reviewed enthusiastically on the front page of the New York Times Book Review by James R. Kincaid:

He does what great artists have always done: refuse to give up on the shapes they can find in or impress on their materials. And so he remains true to the power of his own language and his own heart. He does not lie. He finds in these young smoke jumpers the classic hubris, the heartbraking panache, with which they tackled all fires, never realizing that their very facility in keeping all little fires little was unfitting them for dealing with a big fire. He brilliantly traces the small details, which, as in Othello or Oedipus Rex, build to overwhelming force; he calls them "screwups", true, but they have the same dignity and terrifying force as Desdemona's handkerchief.

In the Los Angeles Times Book Review, William Hauptman wrote that "Dreadful as their deaths were, the courage of these young men and Maclean's Homeric treatment leaves one with a feeling of exaltation." Enthusiastic reviews also appeared in the Boston Sunday Globe, Toronto Star, Chicago Tribune, Chicago Sun-Times, The Christian Science Monitor, and The Washington Times.

In the New York Review of Books, Robert M. Adams called the book "a humane and personal memoir, scarcely less elegiac and elegantly written than the first one, A River Runs Through It". In The Christian Century, John Ottenhoff also compared the book to A River Runs through It: "While the similarities between the two books are not obvious, Young Men and Fire echoes Maclean's earlier fiction and parallels its subtle theological explorations. Most strikingly, both books show Maclean obsessed with the question of grace: Why do some receive the grace to survive, while others die untimely, tragically?"

Other critics, however, compared Young Men and Fire unfavorably with A River Runs through It or said it suffered from being unfinished. Ginny Merriam's scorching summation was, "Maclean clearly was not finished with it. More time could have tumbled every sentence into the heart-stopping art we know Maclean could create." In an extensive 1994 essay drawing from her correspondence with Maclean, his friend and former student, the literary scholar and poet Marie Borroff, said of Young Men and Fire that "in the end it defeated him, at least in his own eyes.... Yet he managed to leave behind enough written materials to be edited into a book whose voice and vision are his own." Boroff judges the last twenty pages of the book a failure: "If his creative energies had lasted, he would surely have been able to contrive an ending equal in power to the memorable final paragraphs of A River Runs Through It." A 2015 essay by the book's editor, Alan Thomas, in the Los Angeles Review of Books discusses the book's history and takes up Boroff's criticism: "The closing pages of Young Men and Fire may be imperfect and strained, but that is because Maclean is trying to grasp something ultimate—the quality of 'a special kind of death', the death of the young and unfulfilled."

Young Men and Fire had a 30,000-copy first printing and as of December 1992 was in its fifth printing. It spent 14 weeks on the New York Times best sellers list and was chosen one of the nine best books of 1992 by the New York Times Book Review. It won the 1992 National Book Critics Circle award for general nonfiction. Speaking at the award ceremony in March 1993, Maclean's son John N. Maclean said that "the book has had an extraordinary effect on the survivors, first raising anxieties and stirring old bitterness, but eventually at least for some easing the sting of that cataclysmic event more than four decades ago. In a way, the Mann Gulch never stopped burning." "The poignant beauty of Maclean's prose is consoling", wrote the sister-in-law of Stanley Reba, one of the Smokejumpers who died in Mann Gulch, in a letter to the book's publisher: "I felt that at last they had not been forgotten nor would they be. Young Men and Fire is their testimony."

In 2014, the writer Kathryn Schulz published an essay in New York magazine reporting on a trip to Mann Gulch and revisiting Young Men and Fire from the perspective of climate change and evolving ideas about fire suppression: "Like many people, I went to Mann Gulch because of Young Men and Fire—because I had long loved it, but also because I had grown troubled by its role in the wildfire crisis we are currently experiencing. Maclean told, quite beautifully, the story of a tragedy. But also, quite tragically, he told the wrong story." She calls Young Men and Fire "the seminal text in our national war on fire. As an account of how that war is fought, it is accurate and thrilling. As an elegy for the victims, it is beautiful. But, like many such stories, it fails to ask the crucial question: whether that war should ever have been fought in the first place ... Today, the battle in Mann Gulch seems worse than pointless." Schulz's critique echoes Richard Manning's article published 21 years prior. Neither article addresses Maclean's discussion of the Forest Service's revised fire policy.

== See also ==
- Fire on the Mountain, a 1999 book by John Norman Maclean (Norman Maclean’s son) about the 1994 South Canyon Fire on Colorado’s Storm King Mountain, which took the lives of 14 firefighters
