= Mann Gulch =

Gulch in Lewis and Clark County, Montana

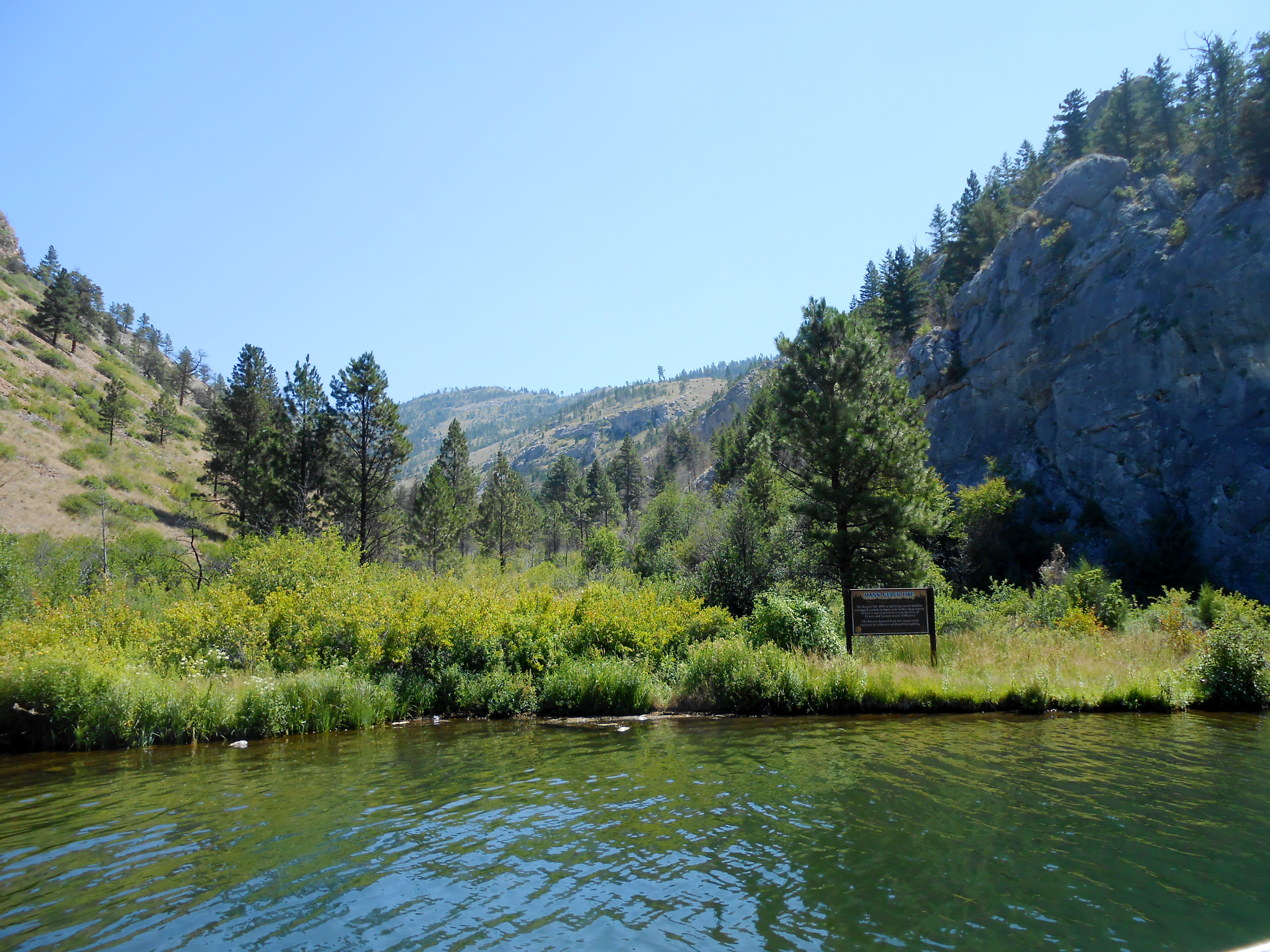
- Mann Gulch, Helena National Forest
- Floor elevation: 3,583 ft (1,092 m)

Geology
- Type: Gulch

Geography
- Location: Helena National Forest
- Country: United States
- State: Montana
- Coordinates: 46°52′42.18″N 111°54′49.72″W
- River: Missouri River
- Interactive map of Mann Gulch

Mann Gulch is a gulch in the Gates of the Mountains Wilderness of the upper Missouri River, 24 miles (39 km) north-northeast of Helena, Montana, in southeastern Lewis and Clark County. It is on the east side of the Missouri River and approximately 9 miles (14 km) east of Interstate 15 (I-15), between Helena and Wolf Creek. Mann Gulch is between Meriwether Canyon immediately to the south and Rescue Gulch immediately to the north, and the creek it contains flows into the Missouri in the canyon known as the Gates of the Mountains. Mann Gulch is approximately 2.4 miles (3.9 km) southeast of Beartooth Mountain.

== History ==
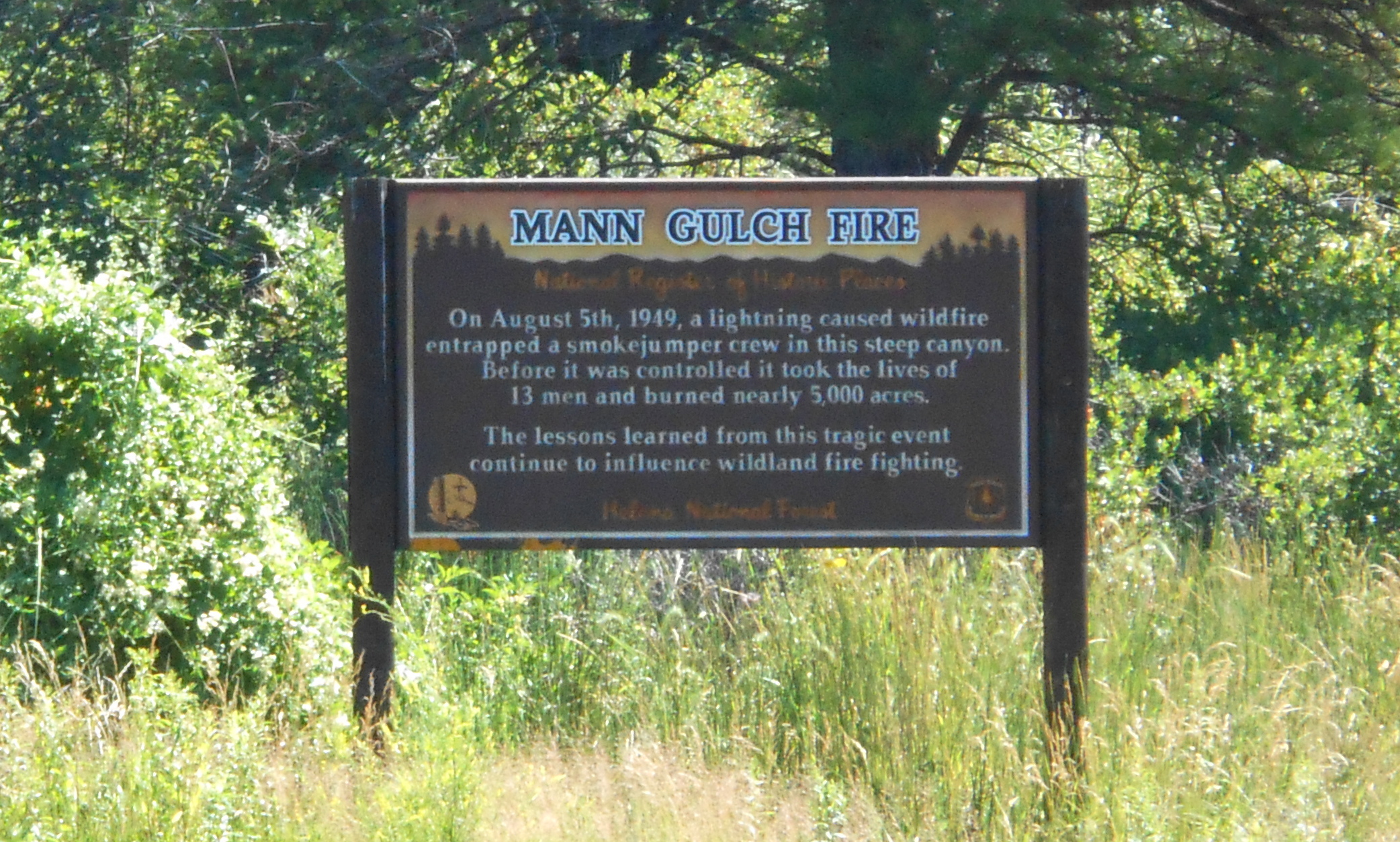
Mann Gulch fire commemorative sign

Mann Gulch is the site of the August 5, 1949 Mann Gulch fire in which 13 firefighters died. The fire is the subject of Norman Maclean's book Young Men and Fire and a topic in the prologue to Adam Grant's book Think Again: The Power of Knowing What You Don't Know (2021). The Mann Gulch fire was started by lightning.
