= John N. Maclean =

American journalist and writer

John Norman Maclean is an American journalist and author who has written five books on fatal wildland fires and a memoir, Home Waters: A Chronicle of Family and a River (June 2021, published by HarperCollins). He is the son of Norman Maclean, author of A River Runs Through It and Young Men and Fire, and grandson of the minister John Norman Maclean.

== Biography ==
John N. Maclean was born in Chicago, Illinois, in 1943, the second of two children. He graduated from Shimer College in Mt. Carroll, Illinois.

Maclean began his career in journalism in 1964 as a police reporter with the City News Bureau of Chicago. He went to work for the Chicago Tribune the following year. He married Frances Ellen McGeachie in 1968; they have two sons—Daniel, a science teacher in Anchorage, Alaska, and John Fitzroy, a public defender for the state of Maryland.

In 1970 Maclean was assigned to the Washington Bureau of the Tribune. During his newspaper career he spent more than a decade as the Tribune’s diplomatic correspondent; he was one of the “Kissinger 14,” the journalists who regularly traveled with Secretary of State Henry Kissinger during the era of shuttle diplomacy. Maclean was a Nieman Fellow in Journalism at Harvard University for the 1974–1975 academic year and became the Tribune’s Foreign Editor in Chicago in 1988. He resigned from the newspaper after the 1994 South Canyon Fire on Colorado's Storm King Mountain killed 14 firefighters. He wrote the story of the fire in his first book, Fire on the Mountain, which in 2000 won the Mountains and Plains Booksellers award for the best non-fiction book of the year. The book was featured in two documentaries by Dateline NBC and the History Channel. Maclean has since written four more books on fatal wildland fires and two others, Home Waters: A Chronicle of Family and a River, and the centennial edition of Ernest Hemingway's Big Two-Hearted River, for which he wrote the foreword. An avid flyfisherman, he currently divides his time between Washington, D.C., and the family cabin at the edge of Seeley Lake, Montana.

== Publications ==
Maclean's most recent book, "Home Waters: A Chronicle of Family and a River," was published in 2021 and has been called a worthy companion to his father's book, "A River Runs through It," as well as a satisfying read on its own merits. The book won an honor award from the Montana Book Award Committee, who called it "a gorgeous chronicle of a family and the land they call home." The centennial edition of Ernest Hemingway's Big Two-Hearted River, published in 2023, for which he wrote the foreword.

Maclean's second book, Fire and Ashes: On the Frontlines of American Wildfire, was published in 2003 and chronicles the 1953 Rattlesnake Fire on the Mendocino National Forest in northern California, along with the 1999 Sadler Fire in Nevada and the 1949 Mann Gulch Fire in Montana, which was the subject of his father Norman's Young Men and Fire, a book published posthumously.

Maclean's third book, The Thirtymile Fire: A Chronicle of Bravery and Betrayal, recounts the deadly Thirtymile Fire and the controversy and recriminations in its aftermath. The Thirtymile entrapped and killed four firefighters.

Maclean's fourth book, The Esperanza Fire: Arson, Murder and the Agony of Engine 57 details the 2006 wildfire that killed five firefighters on a Forest Service engine crew in southern California. The arsonist, Raymond Lee Oyler, was the first person convicted of murder for setting a wildland fire; Oyler was sentenced to death. The California Supreme Court denied Oyler's automatic appeal in May 2025 and he remains in prison. Maclean's fifth book, River of Fire: The Rattlesnake Fire and the Mission Boys, (2018) details the 1953 fire that killed 15 firefighters in northern California, 14 of them members of a missionary fire crew. The story was first chronicled in Maclean's second book, then expanded and updated for publication in this book.
