= Gates of the Mountains Wilderness =

Wilderness located in Montana, USA

- IUCN category Ib (wilderness area)
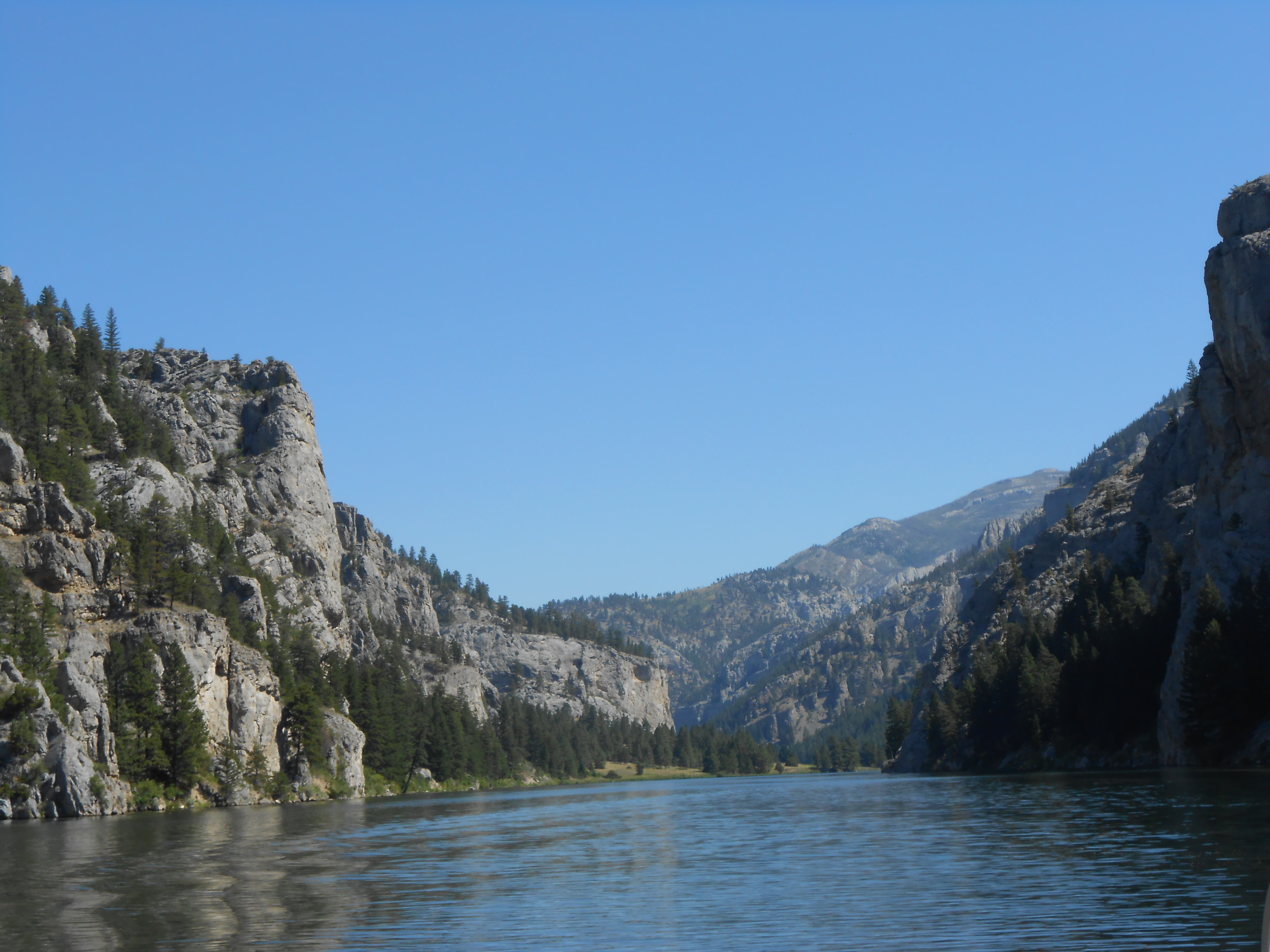
- Outcrops of massive Madison Limestone flank the Missouri River near the Gates of the Mountains canyon formation

- Location within Montana Location within the United States
- Location: Lewis and Clark County, Montana, USA
- Nearest city: Helena, MT
- Coordinates: 46°53′N 111°58′W
- Area: 28,562 acres (115.59 km^{2})
- Established: 1964
- Governing body: U.S. Forest Service

The Gates of the Mountains Wilderness is located in the U.S. state of Montana. Created by an act of Congress in 1964, the wilderness is managed by Helena National Forest. A day use campground near the Gates of the Mountains, Meriwether Picnic site, is named in honor of Meriwether Lewis.

Gates of the Mountains Wilderness (then known as the Gates of the Mountains Wild Area) was the site of the 1949 Mann Gulch fire, which claimed the lives of 13 firefighters and which was the subject of Norman Maclean's book Young Men and Fire.

U.S. Wilderness Areas do not allow motorized or mechanized vehicles, including bicycles. Although camping and fishing are allowed with proper permit, no roads or buildings are constructed and there is also no logging or mining, in compliance with the 1964 Wilderness Act. Wilderness areas within National Forests and Bureau of Land Management areas also allow hunting in season.

== History ==
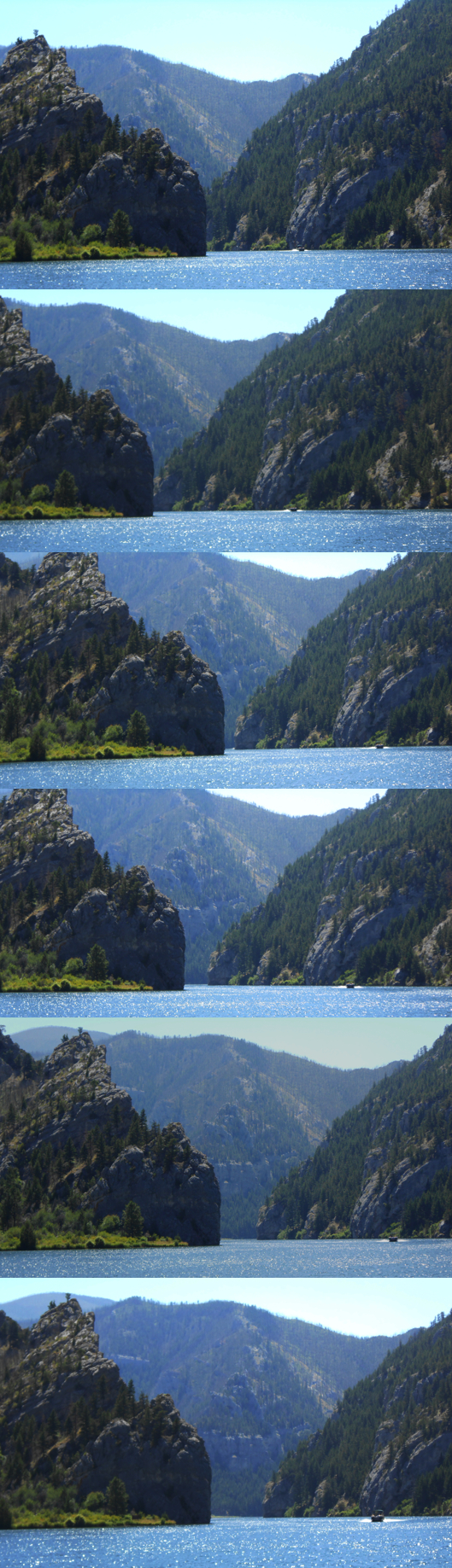
"Opening" of the Gates of the Mountains coming upstream as they would have been viewed by Lewis and Clark

The Gates of the Mountains Wilderness were named by Lewis and Clark. Captain Lewis wrote on July 19, 1805,

this evening we entered much the most remarkable clifts that we have yet seen. these clifts rise from the waters edge on either side perpendicularly to the height of 1200 feet. ... the river appears to have forced its way through this immense body of solid rock for the distance of 5-3/4 Miles ... I called it the gates of the rocky mountains.

In 1918, when Holter Dam was built forming Holter Lake, the water level of the Missouri River in the Gates was raised approximately 14 feet (4.3 m).

The Gates of the Mountains area was considered multiple times for inclusion in the national park system. In 1922, Montana senator Thomas J. Walsh suggested the idea to National Park Service (NPS) director Stephen Mather, writing, "you must be familiar with the locality and with the wonderfully graphic account of its marvels and beauties found in the journal of Lewis and Clark." Mather visited the site but decided that it lacked national significance and that local or state protection would be adequate to preserve it. The NPS dropped the proposal at the end of 1922, only to reconsider it in 1935 and again in the 1960s. Both times, officials reached the same conclusion: "The area is suitable for a county park or a state park." The area received its wilderness designation under the Wilderness Act of 1964.

== Geology ==
The prominent gray cliffs along the Missouri River in the Gates of the Mountains are formed by Madison Limestone. At the southern entrance to the canyon the trace of the Eldorado thrust fault juxtaposes Proterozoic Belt Supergroup Greyson Shale over much younger Madison Limestone; this faulting was part of the Sevier orogeny. Within the canyon, caves and folded layers of Madison Limestone are found. Near the north end of the canyon, at Mann Gulch and further north, alternating ridges and valleys reflect the alternating resistance of younger rock layers overlying the Madison Limestone. The entire canyon is an example of a superposed or antecedent stream, in which the river pre-dates the uplift of the rocks and kept pace with erosion as uplift occurred.

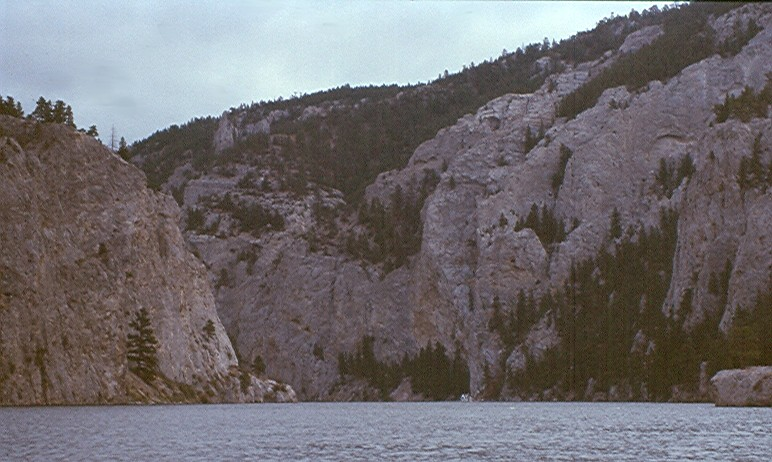
Madison Limestone walls of the Gates of the Mountains

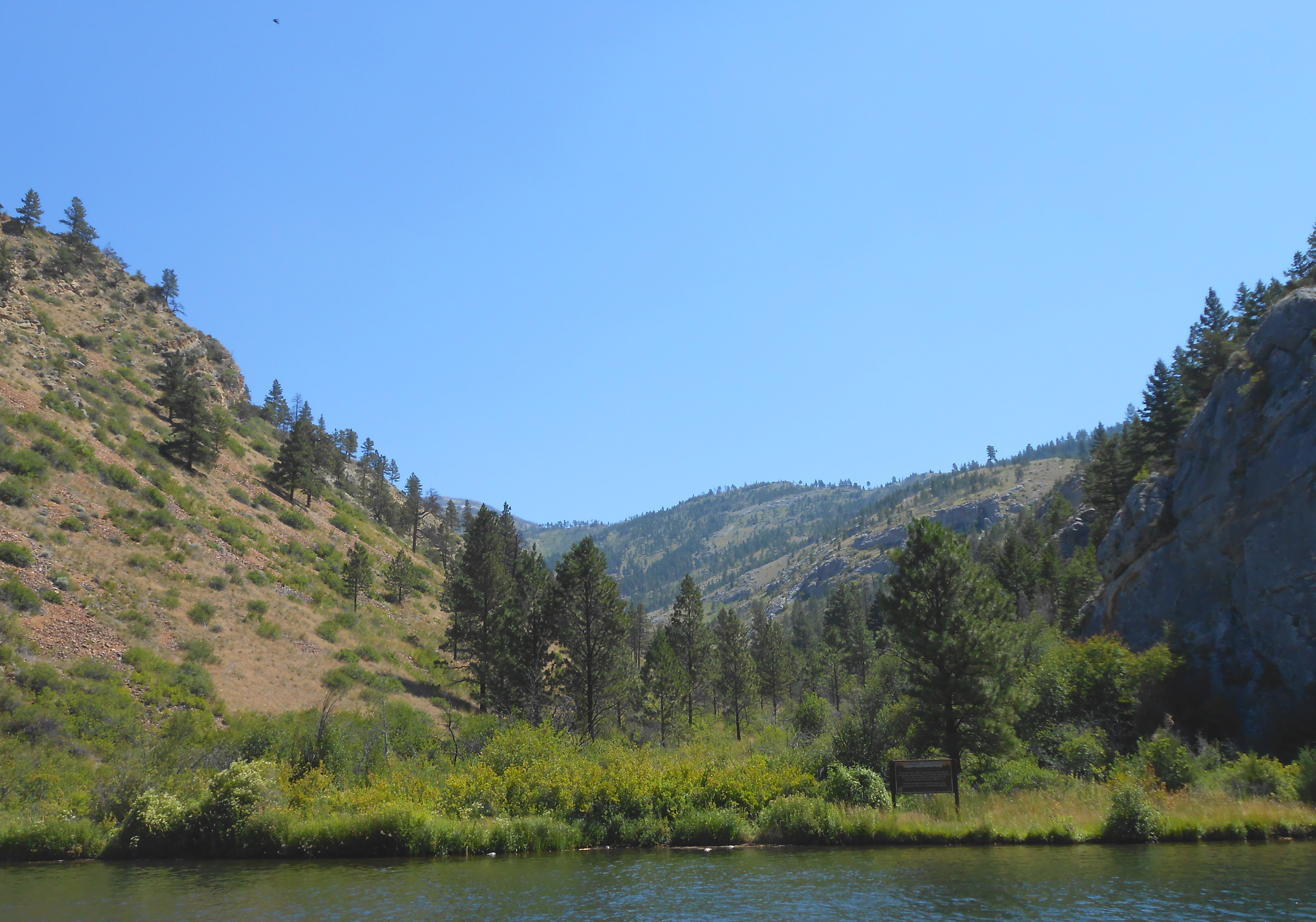
Mann Gulch, in the Gates of the Mountains Wilderness.
