= John Norman Maclean (minister) =

Scottish-Canadian Presbyterian minister

Rev. John Norman Maclean (Scottish Gaelic: Iain mac Tormod, an t-Urr. Iain Tormod MacGilleEathain) (1862–1941) was a Scottish-Canadian Presbyterian minister who emigrated to the United States and served in congregations in California, Iowa, and Montana.

Rev. Maclean is best known as the father of American author Norman Maclean. Norman Maclean wrote vividly about his family in both fictionalized and non-fictional accounts, including the bestseller, A River Runs Through It, which remains an iconic work of 20th century American literature.

== Early life ==
John Norman Maclean was born on July 28, 1862, to Norman Maclean and Mary MacDonald Maclean on the homestead cleared by Maclean's grandparents after emigrating in 1821 from the Isle of Coll to the Canadian Gaelic-speaking community of Marshy Hope, Nova Scotia.

Showing early signs of academic promise, John Norman Maclean trained for the ministry first at Pictou Academy, where academic records refer to him as "J.N. Mclean of Glenbard", a community famous as the last homestead and burial place of Tiree-born Canadian Gaelic poet John MacLean (1787-1848), the former Chief Bard (Scottish Gaelic: Aois-dàna) to the Chief of Clan MacLean of Coll, and who remains a major figure in Scottish Gaelic literature.

He completed his education at Dalhousie College in Halifax and Manitoba College in Winnipeg. He spent the summers riding circuit among small Presbyterian congregations in the pioneer farming communities of the Pembina Valley Region of south-central Manitoba. According to Michael Newton, many pioneer settlements in the Great Plains of Manitoba were Scottish Gaelic-speaking, so Maclean's bilingualism would have been considered a very important skill. In the process of riding circuit, Maclean met his future wife, an English-Canadian schoolmarm named Clara Davidson.

== Ordination and marriage ==
Clara's father, John Davidson, was a Presbyterian immigrant from Northern England, and had settled first near Argenteuil, Laurentides, Quebec, where his daughter Clara had been born. Finding the farm land there to be poor, however, John Davidson and his family had moved west by oxcart and settled on a homestead at New Haven, near Manitou, Manitoba.

During their courtship, Clara often accompanied John while he was riding circuit. In 1893, John Norman Maclean completed advanced studies at San Francisco Theological Seminary in San Anselmo, California, and was ordained as a Presbyterian minister. John and Clara Maclean were married in Pembina, Manitoba, on August 1, 1893.

== Personal life ==
John and Clara Maclean had two sons, both of whom graduated from Dartmouth College. In 1908 the Rev. Maclean moved to Missoula, Montana, and became pastor of the First Presbyterian Church of Missoula in 1909.

The elder son Norman Maclean, was born at Clarinda, Iowa, in 1902 and went on to become a professor at the University of Chicago and a highly regarded figure in 20th century American literature.

When asked by an interviewer about having been homeschooled by his father, Maclean recalled, "I think the most important thing is that he read aloud to us. He was a minister, and every morning after breakfast we had what was called family worship. We'd all sit with our breakfast chairs pulled back from the table and he would read to us from the Bible or from some religious poet. He was a very good reader... that was very good for me because in doing that, he would bring out the rhythms of the Bible. That reading instilled in me this great love of rhythm in language."

The minister's younger son, Paul Davidson MacLean, became well known as a political journalist in Helena, Montana. He moved to Chicago in 1937 and worked in the public affairs department of the University of Chicago, where his brother Norman taught. Paul Maclean suffered from alcoholism and gambling addiction, in addition to being a quick take on a fight with his fists. Offers of help by his family were often rejected or resulted in short-lived efforts at reform.

On the early morning of May 2, 1938, Paul Maclean was attacked and brutally beaten at Sixty-Third Street and Drexel Avenue in Chicago. Paul MacLean was taken to nearby Woodlawn Hospital, where he died. without regaining consciousness, at 1:20 pm that same afternoon. According to his brother Norman, Paul Maclean fought back against his attackers and sold his life dearly. So much so, in fact, that all the bones in his right hand were found to have been broken during his last fight.

Following a homicide investigation by Detective Sergeant Ignatius Sheehan, the Chicago Police Department ruled Paul Maclean's murder to be a mugging gone bad. Another theory at the time was that Paul MacLean was murdered over his inability to pay an illegal gambling debt owed to a southside Chicago gang. No link of this kind was ever made by police, however. No arrests were ever made and the case remains officially unsolved.

The Rev. Maclean's love of literature and his own literary efforts proved an inspiration for Norman, however. He wrote a semi-autobiographical account of the family's life and Paul's death in a novella, A River Runs Through It which was published in 1976. Robert Redford later adapted into a film of the same name that sparked a national and international fly fishing craze.

== Death and legacy ==
Maclean died in 1941. In 2009 First Presbyterian Church in Missoula dedicated a monument to honor Rev. Maclean.

== In popular culture ==
- In Robert Redford's award-winning 1992 film adaptation of Norman Maclean's autobiographical novella, Rev. John Norman Maclean was portrayed onscreen by actor Tom Skerritt.
