= Marshy Hope, Nova Scotia =

Community in Nova Scotia, Canada

Coordinates: 45°35′4″N 62°12′8″W

Marshy Hope in Nova Scotia

Marshy Hope is a community in the Canadian province of Nova Scotia, located in Pictou County. The Cape Breton and Central Nova Scotia Railway (CBNS) passes through Marshy Hope. The railway line was owned and operated by Canadian National Railway (CN) before CN sold the line in October 1993 to RailTex, a shortline railway holding company, which created CBNS to operate the line beginning in 1994.

== Notable residents ==
- John Norman Maclean (minister), father of author Norman Maclean who used his father as a character
