= South Canyon Fire =

1994 Colorado wildfire

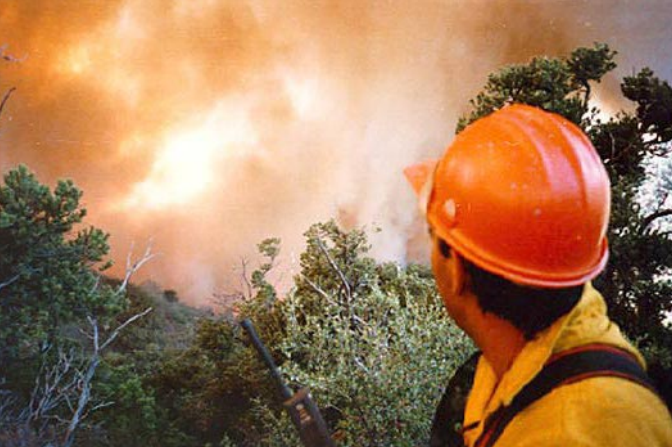
- The fatal spot fire approaching the ridgeline.
- Date: July 2, 1994 — July 11, 1994

Statistics
- Burned area: 2,115 acres (9 km^{2})

Impacts
- Deaths: 14

Ignition
- Cause: Lightning strike

The South Canyon Fire was a 1994 wildfire that killed 14 wildland firefighters on Storm King Mountain, near Glenwood Springs, Colorado, on July 6, 1994. Often referred to as the Storm King fire, the fire was started by a dry lightning storm on July 2, sending several wildland firefighting crews to engage the fire. Smokejumpers, interagency hotshot crews, and helitack crews were dispatched to engage the fire from multiple bases.

On July 6, a cold front reached the area, increasing wind speed and creating a surge in fire activity. A major spot fire developed and entrapped 9 hotshots, 3 smokejumpers, and 2 helitack crewmembers, leading to their deaths. The fire grew to 2,115 acres before being contained and controlled July 11.

After the fire was contained, an official investigation was launched to identify critical failure points and prevent a similar disaster. The investigation found that both dispatch centers and incident leadership failed to communicate fire weather and behavior accordingly. In addition to those failures, firefighters on the ground did not recognize or failed to communicate the compromise of the majority of the 10 Standard Firefighting Orders and 18 Watch Out Situations. The investigation has since been criticized for inaccuracies and poor practices.

== Background ==
During June of 1994, Colorado experienced record highs and weather patterns of intense thunderstorms, leading to several wildfires across the state. Red flag warnings were issued for western Colorado based on forecasts for dry thunderstorms with strong and gusty winds. Western Colorado was in extreme drought, as shown on the July 9 Palmer Drought Index map.

The Bureau of Land Management's Grand Junction District had experienced several fires, which were twice the annual average. Type 1 and 2 Incident Management Teams had responded to five times the number of fires that they would respond to in a normal year. The district issued a directive ordering all fires to be attacked and suppressed as soon as possible.

The Grand Junction District, which included the BLM regional dispatch center, was in very high to extreme fire danger, with 90 percent of its firefighting resources committed to fires. Lightning storms during the previous 2 days had resulted in more than 40 new fires, and the district had developed a priority list for initial attack. Fires threatening residences, structures, and utilities, or those highest potential to spread, were given the highest priority.

== Fire origin ==
On July 2, 1994, lightning sparked a fire near the base of Storm King Mountain, 7 miles (11 km) west of Glenwood Springs, Colorado. Initially small and well away from private property, the fire was assigned low priority and allowed to smolder for the first two days. Due to a confusion of the location, it was named after South Canyon, which is across the river from Storm King Mountain.

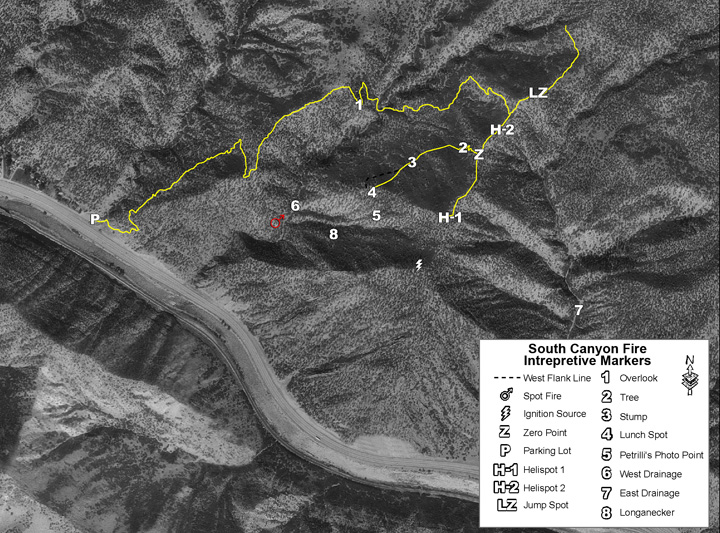
A top-down view of the South Canyon Fire.

Nearby residents of Canyon Creek Estates grew increasingly concerned by the persistent blaze, prompting local authorities to take action. At 11:00 a.m. Mountain Standard Time (GMT-7) on July 3, local authorities reported the fire to the BLM dispatch center, which contacted the Western Slope Fire Coordination Center and requested eight smokejumpers and a lead plane to respond to Storm King Mountain and other possible fires in the area.

By July 4, the fire had burned only 3 acres (1.2 ha). It burned in a low intensity state, consuming grass, twigs, and leaves downslope of the initial lightning strike. At 3:40 p.m., the Sopris Ranger District dispatched one Forest Service engine crew to the fire, which reported that the fire posed no threat to structures in town. Another engine, this one BLM, was sent to the fire. At 6:30 p.m., the incident commander, BLM, and USFS firefighters sized up the fire and decided to begin suppression operations on the next day, July 5 due to the darkness and steep terrain.

== Incident ==
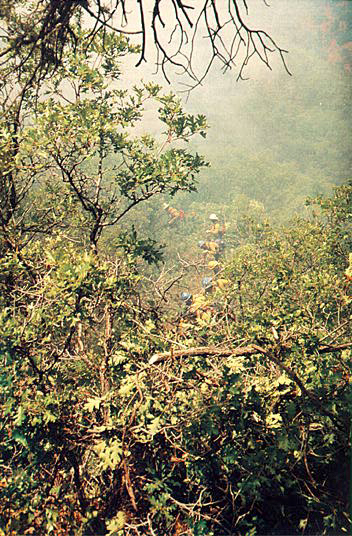
Smokejumpers and part of the Prineville Hotshot Crew on the West Flank Fireline, surrounded by thick Gamble Oak on the slope of Storm King Mountain. Photo by Tony Petrilli, U.S. Forest Service.

=== July 5 ===
On July 5, firefighters began their approach from the west at the east end of Canyon Creek Estates, making a difficult march up the rugged terrain. Upon arrival at the top of the ridge, the combined BLM and Forest Service crews began clearing a landing zone known as Helispot 1. This helispot could serve as a safety zone. Firefighters began constructing firelines to contain the blaze.

The fight was joined that evening by the Missoula Smokejumpers, from Montana, who began aiding in the construction of the firelines, working well into the night of July 5 but quitting at approximately 12:30 a.m. (July 6) due to danger from rolling rocks. By the end of July 5, the fire had burned approximately 50 acres, while leaving small unburnt islands in the valley. Early in the morning of July 6, the BLM and Forest Service crew completed work on a second landing/safety zone, Helispot 2. Another smokejumper crew, this time from McCall, Idaho, arrived to the incident. In addition, Helicopter 93R (Romeo) was ordered, bringing the Western Slope Helitack Crew.

=== Morning of July 6 ===
The day after, July 6, strong winds began to blow in the West Drainage area. A crew of hotshots from Prineville, OR, were ordered to the South Canyon Fire. They joined 16 smokejumpers, 2 helitack crewmembers, and 11 BLM/USFS engine crewmembers. Gusts grew in speed, and a helicopter tasked with observation was limited to four hours due to the dangerous conditions. The jumper-in-charge, Don Mackey, of the smokejumpers and another jumper expressed safety concerns due to the downhill line construction and worsening weather.

Meanwhile, at 3:20 p.m., a cold front which had been forecasted hit the fire area. Firefighters were not formally briefed on this weather event, with a couple of Prineville crewmembers aware of the upcoming winds. The cold front brought 45 mph winds directly over the fire area. Dispatchers neglected to inform lead smokejumper Mackey.

=== Blowup ===
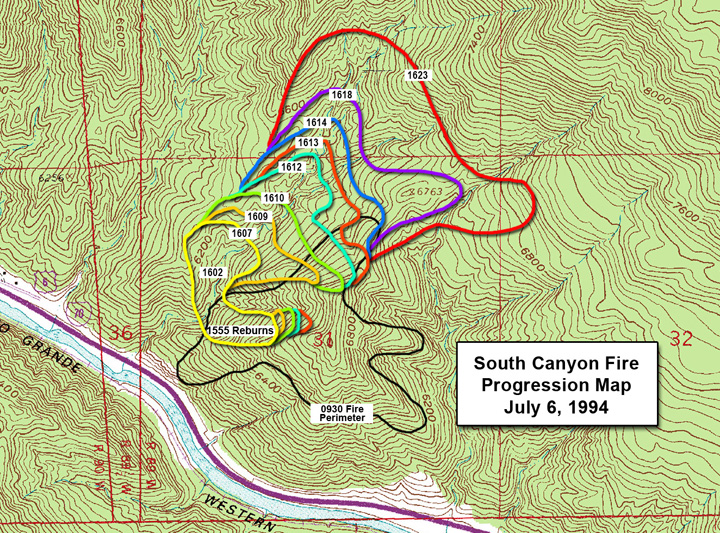
A map of the progression of the fire through the blowup on July 6.

At 3:45 p.m., the fire made several rapid movements with 100-foot flame lengths. It reversed directions several times and began to reach the canopy of trees. At this point, water drops were deemed ineffective, and several firefighters working on the main fireline noticed the activity and began to pull back.

At 4:00 p.m., the fire blew up and raced towards the fleeing firefighters. As it went up the slope, even stronger winds of 40 mph pushed it further. Beginning at 4:14 and 4:18 p.m., the fire was observed to spot back to the east side of the drainage below the crew that was walking out the fireline to the ridge. The spot fire reached the ridgeline in 2 minutes. During the run the fire's rate of speed accelerated from 3 to 11 mph.

==== Smokejumpers with Petrilli ====
Don Mackey, the jumper-in-charge, left to locate a line scout, Dale Longanecker, who had been monitoring the fire. Mackey was last seen alive by a group led by smokejumper Anthony Petrilli, who was headed toward the burnt-out area by Helispot 1. At 4:19 p.m., 8 smokejumpers, including Petrilli, deployed their fire shelters just below Helispot 1. All 8 smokejumpers survived.

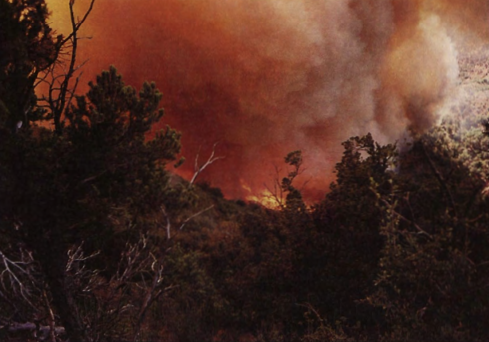
An image taken by one of the surviving hotshot crewmembers of the spot fire.

==== Main Prineville hotshot group ====
Meanwhile, 11 members of Prineville IHC, including the superintendent, had been on the main ridge and were ordered to the safety zone Helispot 1. However, fire had enveloped the safety zone and forced them to move toward the Helispot 2 safety zone. These hotshots made it down the ridge and onto the interstate, surviving the fire.

==== Western flank group ====
On the western flank, the 9 remaining members of the Prineville Hotshot Crew joined up with jumper-in-charge Mackey. At this point, firefighters were unaware of the wall of flame growing behind them. A spot fire grew to 150 ft tall and 1/4 of a mile wide, and began rolling down the slope to the hotshots and smokejumpers. As the spot fire spread, the crew's squad leaders ordered the firefighters to drop their equipment and run. Conflicting orders came through, with the squad leader at the front of the line ordering the crew to deploy fire shelters. In the end, all the firefighters abandoned their gear and ran for the ridge top, an incredibly steep climb through thick pinyon-juniper.

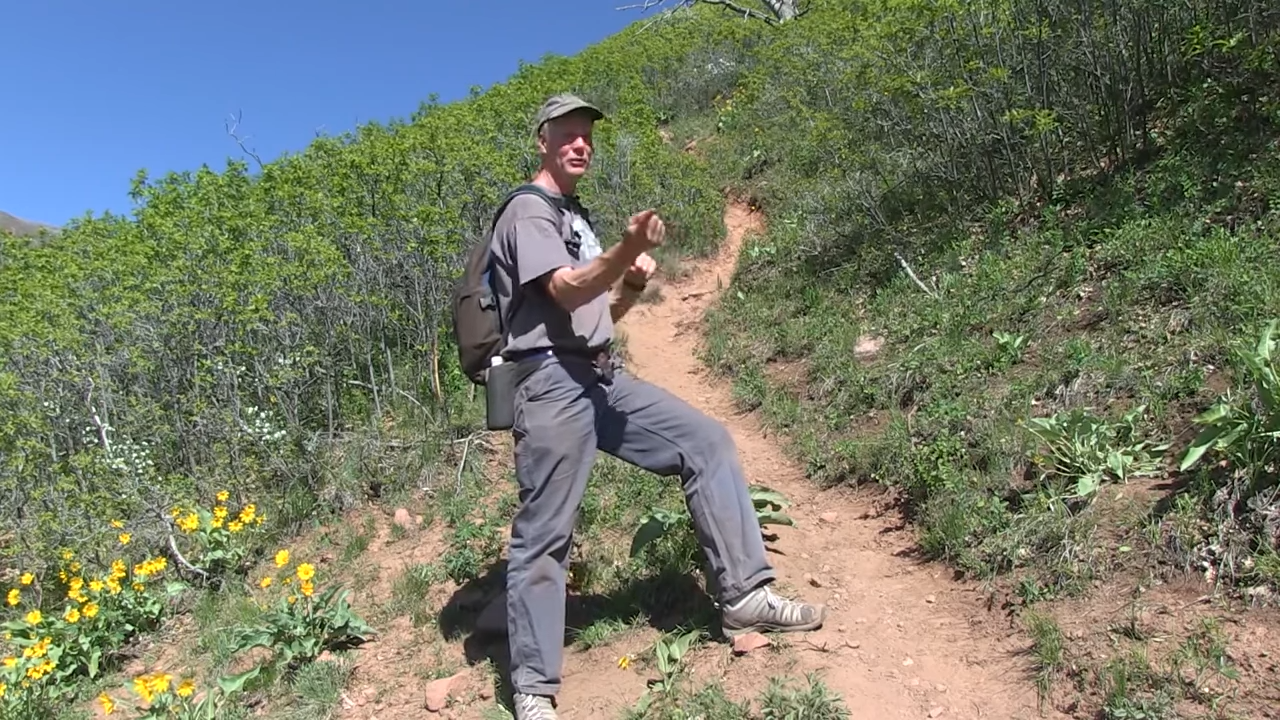
Smokejumper Eric Hipke showing the trail where he was forced to run for his life.

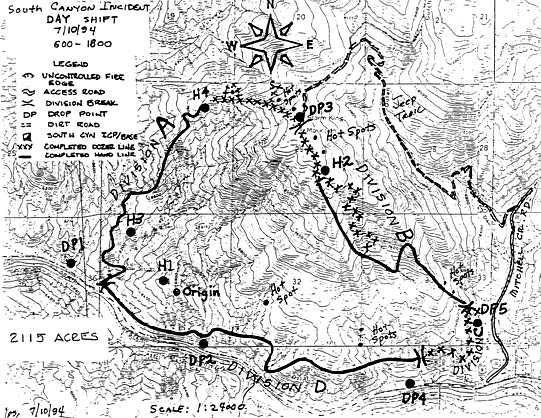
South Canyon Fire Day Shift Fire Map for July 10, 1994. This map shows the approximate final fire perimeter and fire size of 2,115 acres.

Two smokejumpers, Erickson and Haugh, ran for the ridge top first. A third jumper, Eric Hipke, joined them at the top. Hipke was seriously burned, but all three survived, escaping down the drainage to the interstate. The fire overtook the firefighters who had delayed their run, killing all of them just short of the ridge top. This group contained the other half of the Prineville Hotshot Crew and three smokejumpers.

==== Helitack crewmembers ====
The remaining helitack crewmembers were directing fire suppression efforts when they were yelled at by other firefighters to escape through the East Drainage. However, they did not feel that it was a good escape route and chose to run along the ridge to find a better route. The fire funneled through the saddle at the jumpers' landing site and cut off an eastern escape route. At 4:22 p.m., they were stopped on the ridge by a steep, rocky chute 50 feet deep and perished when they couldn't cross.

=== Containment and mop-up operations ===
While firefighters were evacuated, the fire grew massively in size. At its largest, it stood around 2,115 acres. Fresh teams of firefighters were ordered to contain the fire immediately after the fatal blowup. The fire was declared controlled on July 11, 1994.

== Casualties ==
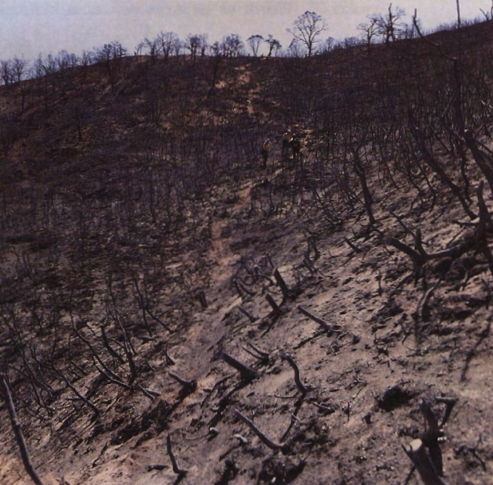
The fireline and fatality site of the Prineville hotshot crew. The firefighters fell while attempting to climb the trail to the top of the ridge.

Twelve firefighters were unable to outrun the blaze and perished. From the Prineville Hotshots, Kathi Beck, Tamera Bickett, Scott Blecha, Levi Brinkley, Douglas Dunbar, Terri Hagen, Bonnie Holtby, Rob Johnson, and Jon Kelso were killed. This group was working with smokejumpers Don Mackey, Roger Roth, and Jim Thrash. Two more helitack firefighters were also killed as they tried to flee to the northwest: Robert Browning, Jr. and Richard Tyler.

== Aftermath and investigation ==
As soon as wildland firefighters were confirmed to have been killed, the director of the BLM and the chief of the USFS designated a 10 member interagency investigation team. The team was tasked to submit a developed and factual report within 45 days. Despite several inquiries, the South Canyon Fire Investigative Report was criticized for its incomplete information and subpar data collection strategies.

The team identified several factors as the leadup to the fatalities. These fall into two main categories: human factors and fire conditions. For human factors, no weather observations were taken onsite. These are critical, especially when rapidly changing conditions (cold front passage) could affect fire behavior. Fire weather and red flag warnings were not broadcast over fire radio frequencies, nor were they given to firefighters on the fire. In addition, some firefighters knew a cold front was expected on July 6. Leadership was not fully aware, and neither were the smokejumpers, who had provided leadership on the fireline. Firefighters were not fully briefed on escape routes and safety zones, two critical parts of the acronym LCES. Finally, eight of the 10 Standard Firefighting Orders were compromised. Twelve of the 18 Watch Out Situations were not properly actioned or recognized.

However, for the actual location, the area was very steep and rugged with 50 to 100 percent slopes. This made movement and line construction operations exceedingly difficult. In addition to the sharp slopes, the nearby fuels were extremely dry, making them prone to rapid spread.

One recommendation from the South Canyon Fire review was that every firefighter should carry a radio. The lessons learned post-South Canyon changed many of the strategies wildland firefighters today. Situational awareness is encouraged, while acronyms like LCES (Lookouts, Communications, Escape Routes, Safety Zones) are emphasized. In addition, publications like the IRPG (Incident Response Pocket Guide) is issued to all federal wildland firefighters and contains a trove of knowledge about fire behavior, avoiding casualties, and identifying common indicators of disaster fires.

== Memorials ==
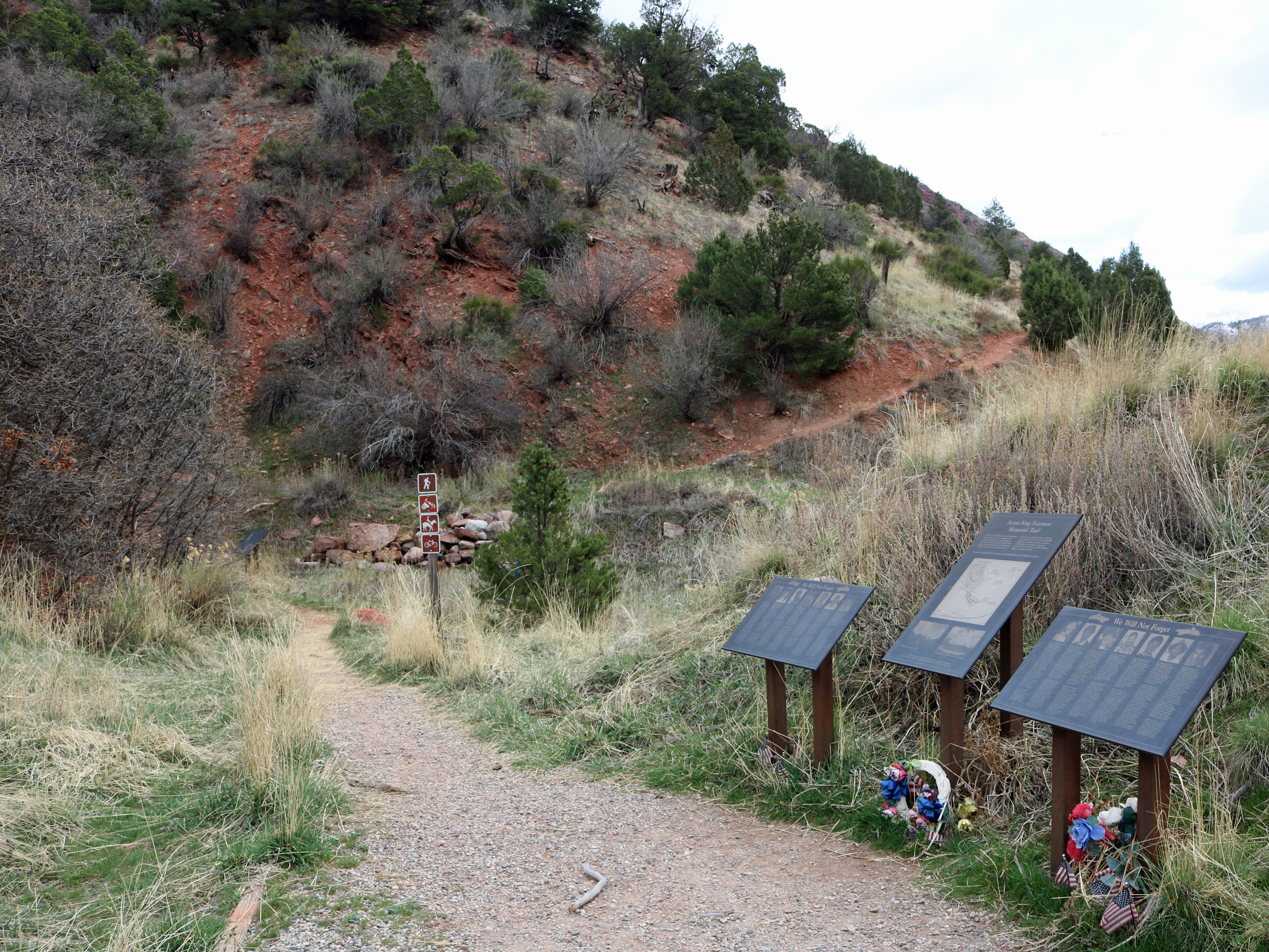
The beginning of the Storm King Mountain Memorial trail.

The Storm King Mountain Memorial Trail, closely following the actual path the firefighters hiked to fight the blaze, leads visitors to the site. Plaques and memorials line the trail explaining the events and paying homage to those who fell. Crosses were installed where each person fell.

The fire and ensuing casualties were the subject of John Maclean's book Fire on the Mountain: The True Story of the South Canyon Fire.
