= A River Runs Through It (film) =

1992 film by Robert Redford

- Theatrical release poster
- Directed by: Robert Redford
- Screenplay by: Richard Friedenberg
- Based on: A River Runs Through It by Norman Maclean
- Produced by: Jake Eberts; Robert Redford; Patrick Markey
- Starring: Craig Sheffer; Brad Pitt; Tom Skerritt; Brenda Blethyn; Emily Lloyd
- Cinematography: Philippe Rousselot
- Edited by: Robert Estrin; Lynzee Klingman
- Music by: Mark Isham
- Distributed by: Columbia Pictures
- Release dates: September 11, 1992 (Toronto); October 9, 1992 (United States)
- Running time: 123 minutes
- Country: United States
- Language: English
- Budget: $12 million
- Box office: $66 million

A River Runs Through It is a 1992 American period drama film directed by Robert Redford. It is based on Norman Maclean's 1976 semi-autobiographical novella of the same name. The film stars Craig Sheffer and Brad Pitt as brothers Norman and Paul Maclean, and it also stars Tom Skerritt, Brenda Blethyn, and Emily Lloyd.

Set in and around Missoula, Montana, the film follows two sons of a Presbyterian minister as they grow up and come of age in the Rocky Mountain region. The film spans a period of time from the World War I era to the early days of the Great Depression.

A River Runs Through It premiered at the 1992 Toronto International Film Festival and was released in the United States by Columbia Pictures on October 9, 1992. It received positive reviews and was nominated for three Academy Awards, winning the Academy Award for Best Cinematography. Robert Redford was nominated for a Golden Globe Award for Best Director for his work in the film.

== Plot ==
An elderly Norman Maclean is preparing a fishing lure in a river, narrating how his father suggested that he write the story of his family. The film then flashes back to the early 1900s. The Maclean brothers, Norman and Paul, grow up in Missoula, Montana, with their mother, Clara, and their father, Rev. John Maclean, a Presbyterian minister, from whom they learn a love of fly fishing for trout in the Blackfoot River. Norman and Paul are home-schooled under the strict moral and academic code of their father. Norman leaves to attend college at Dartmouth. Six years later, during the Prohibition era and the Jazz Age, he returns and finds that Paul has become a skilled fisherman and a hard-drinking investigative journalist working for a newspaper in Helena.

Norman attends a Fourth of July dance and meets Jessie Burns, a flapper whose father runs the general store in Wolf Creek. Smitten, Norman calls her the next morning and sets up a double date. Norman and Jessie go on their first date at the Lolo Hot Springs speakeasy. Paul arrives with his date, a similarly hard-drinking Cheyenne woman named Mabel, who is treated as an inferior by the white crowd.

After Paul is arrested for hitting a man who insulted Mabel, Norman is called to bail him out of jail. The desk sergeant says that Paul has angered local criminals by falling behind in his debts from a big poker game at the speakeasy in Lolo. Norman offers to give money to Paul, who brushes him off.

Jessie eventually asks Norman to help her alcoholic brother Neal, who is visiting from Southern California. Norman and Paul dislike Neal, but at Jessie's insistence they invite him to go fly fishing. Neal shows up drunk with a can of worms and a woman named Rawhide, a prostitute he met the night before. Norman and Paul get separated from Neal but go fishing anyway. They return to their car hours later to find that Neal and Rawhide have drunk all the beer, have had sex, have passed out naked, and both suffered severe sunburns.

Norman drives an intoxicated Neal home, where Jessie is enraged that the brothers left Neal alone with the beer instead of fishing with him. Norman tells Jessie that he is falling in love with her. Jessie drives away angry but a week later asks Norman to come to the train station to see Neal off. After the train departs, Jessie laments her failure to save Neal from his alcoholism. Norman shows Jessie a letter from the University of Chicago offering him a faculty position in the Department of English Literature. He tells Jessie that he does not wish to leave Montana and when it becomes clear that it is because of her, she embraces him.

That night, a drunken Norman meets up with Paul and announces his love for Jessie. Paul says that they should celebrate but instead takes Norman to the Lolo speakeasy. Paul tries to get in on the poker game in the backroom, but the dealer will not let him play because he already owes so much. This leads to a brief altercation until Norman intervenes. At the car, Paul tells Norman that he is not leaving since he is feeling lucky and that he will convince the others to let him play. Norman reluctantly drives off after Paul asks him to go fishing the next day.

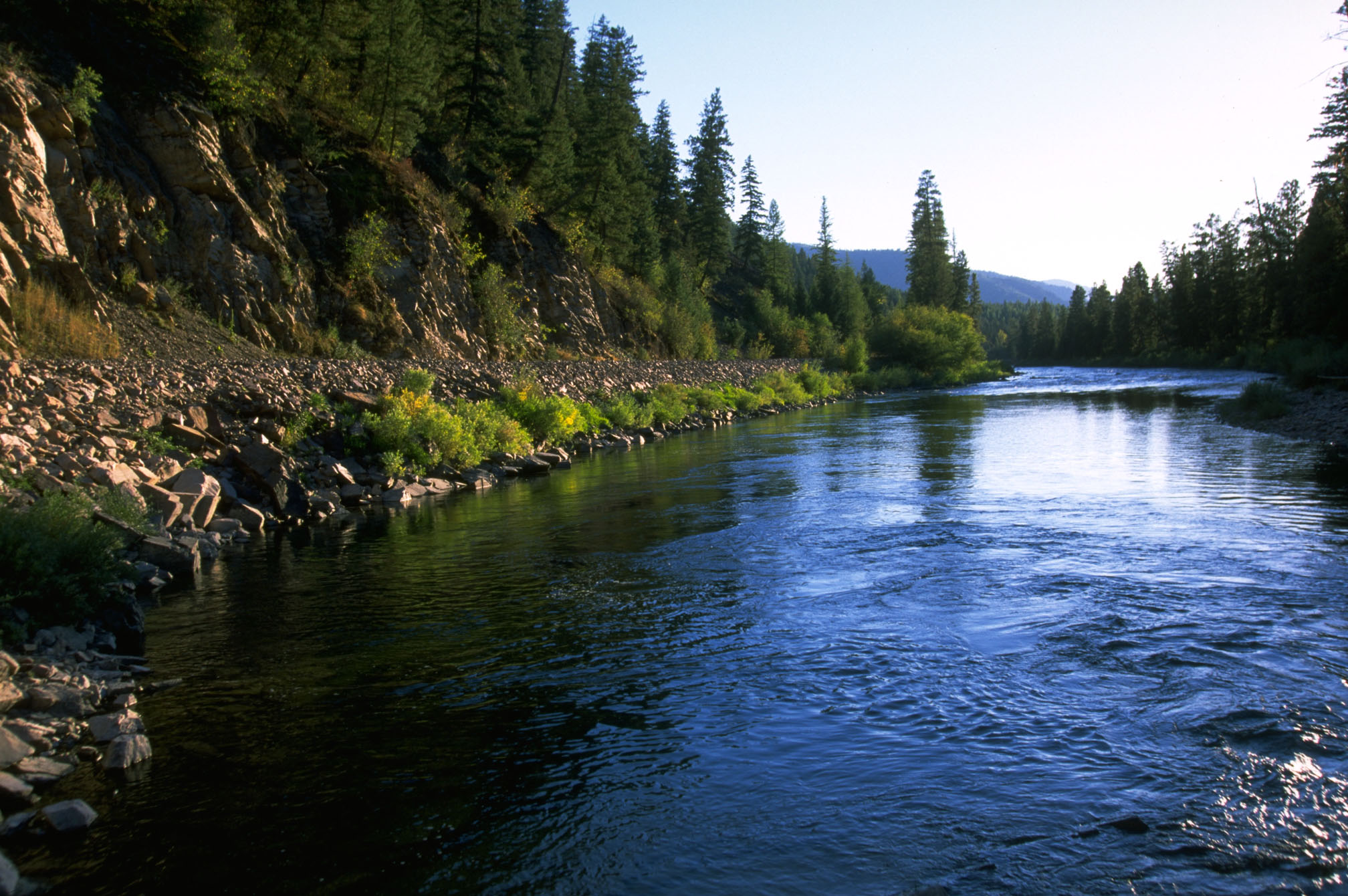
Blackfoot River

Norman is relieved when Paul arrives the following morning, as he feared for his brother's life. Norman tells his family that he is going to accept the job in Chicago. Norman, Paul, and their father go fly fishing one last time. Norman urges his brother to come with him and Jessie to Chicago, but Paul says that he will never leave Montana. He hooks a huge rainbow trout that drags him down the river rapids before he lands it. Rev. Maclean says that Paul has become a wonderful fisherman and an artist in the craft, much to Paul's delight.

Before Norman is to leave for Chicago, police inform him that Paul was beaten to death, and that all of the bones in his right hand were broken. Norman breaks the news to his crestfallen parents. Years later, Mrs. Maclean, Norman, Jessie, and their two children listen to a sermon given by Rev. Maclean soon before his own death, in which he preaches about being unable to help loved ones who are destroying themselves and will not accept help, and concluding that all those who truly care for such a self-destructive person can do is to give unconditional love, even without understanding why. The film concludes in the present day with the elderly Norman fishing in the river, lamenting about what he has learned now that all of his loved ones have passed on.

== Cast ==
- Craig Sheffer as Norman Maclean
  - Joseph Gordon-Levitt as young Norman
  - Arnold Richardson as Old Norman
  - Robert Redford as the voice of older Norman
- Brad Pitt as Paul Maclean
  - Vann Gravage as young Paul
- Tom Skerritt as Reverend Maclean
- Brenda Blethyn as Mrs. Maclean
- Emily Lloyd as Jessie Burns
- Edie McClurg as Mrs. Burns
- Stephen Shellen as Neal Burns
- Nicole Burdette as Mabel
- Susan Traylor as Rawhide
- Michael Cudlitz as Chub
- William Hootkins as Murphy

== Production ==
=== Pre-production ===
In 1976, the same year the novella A River Runs Through It and Other Stories was published, Richard Sylbert optioned the film rights to it, with William Hjortsberg attached as writer. However, the option gradually lapsed without further updates on the adaptation. This made author Norman Maclean distrustful of Hollywood, with any further attempts to option the novella, including one by William Hurt, being met with immediate reluctance from Maclean for the next ten years.

Robert Redford, who had read the novella in 1980, said he was "immediately captivated by it", appreciating Maclean's depiction of the American West and feeling a strong connection to the Scottish immigrant protagonists, being of Scottish-Irish heritage himself. Over the course of six weeks, Redford and Maclean met thrice to discuss the former's vision for a film adaptation. Maclean was impressed, granting Redford an option which allowed Maclean first-draft script approval. However, Maclean died in August 1990, before production even began on the film, leading to surviving family members including his daughter and son-in-law to discuss the script instead. In October 1987, the Los Angeles Herald Examiner reported that Redford's Northfork Productions would produce the adaptation; John Sacret Young was initially attached as screenwriter, but he was not mentioned in subsequent updates, nor is he credited onscreen.

Finance and distribution for A River Runs Through It had been precarious for much of the pre-production stage. Northfork and Cineplex Odeon entered a joint venture in October 1987 to co-finance low budget films in the $5–6 million range, this film being one of them, but this arrangement fell through when Cineplex Odeon's distribution arm collapsed. Eventually, Carolco Pictures agreed to finance the film under the condition that Redford kept the budget below $10 million and agreed to act in one of their future films. The company would also acquire worldwide distribution rights, with domestic distribution handled by Seven Arts, Carolco's joint venture with New Line Cinema. However, owing to financial troubles, Carolco dropped out as well. Finally, Jake Eberts, who had been trying to option the novel previously, immediately joined as financier when Redford took the project to Allied Filmmakers; Variety initially reported that Carolco would co-finance and retain worldwide distribution, but the company ultimately dropped out of the project.

Screenwriter Richard Friedenberg was initially skeptical about adapting the novella and turned it down, fearing he would write a "fishing movie". Friedenberg ultimately signed on, conducting extensive research, with Maclean's surviving daughter and son-in-law providing him with old yearbooks and love letters between Maclean and his wife Jessie. Friedenberg's screenplay made some changes to the novella, including rearranging chronological events and shortening them into a smaller time frame and making the details of Paul Maclean's murder clearer than they were in the novella. Wanting to preserve Maclean's language from the original, Redford made the decision to add narration using lines from the novella verbatim. For this purpose, he auditioned 26 actors and author Wallace Stegner. Unsatisfied with the auditions, Redford decided to provide narration himself, despite concerns over it coming off as egocentric and self-indulgent.

Before Shaffer and Pitt were cast, Kyle MacLachlan and Cary Elwes were the other finalists to portray Norman and Paul, respectively.

=== Filming ===
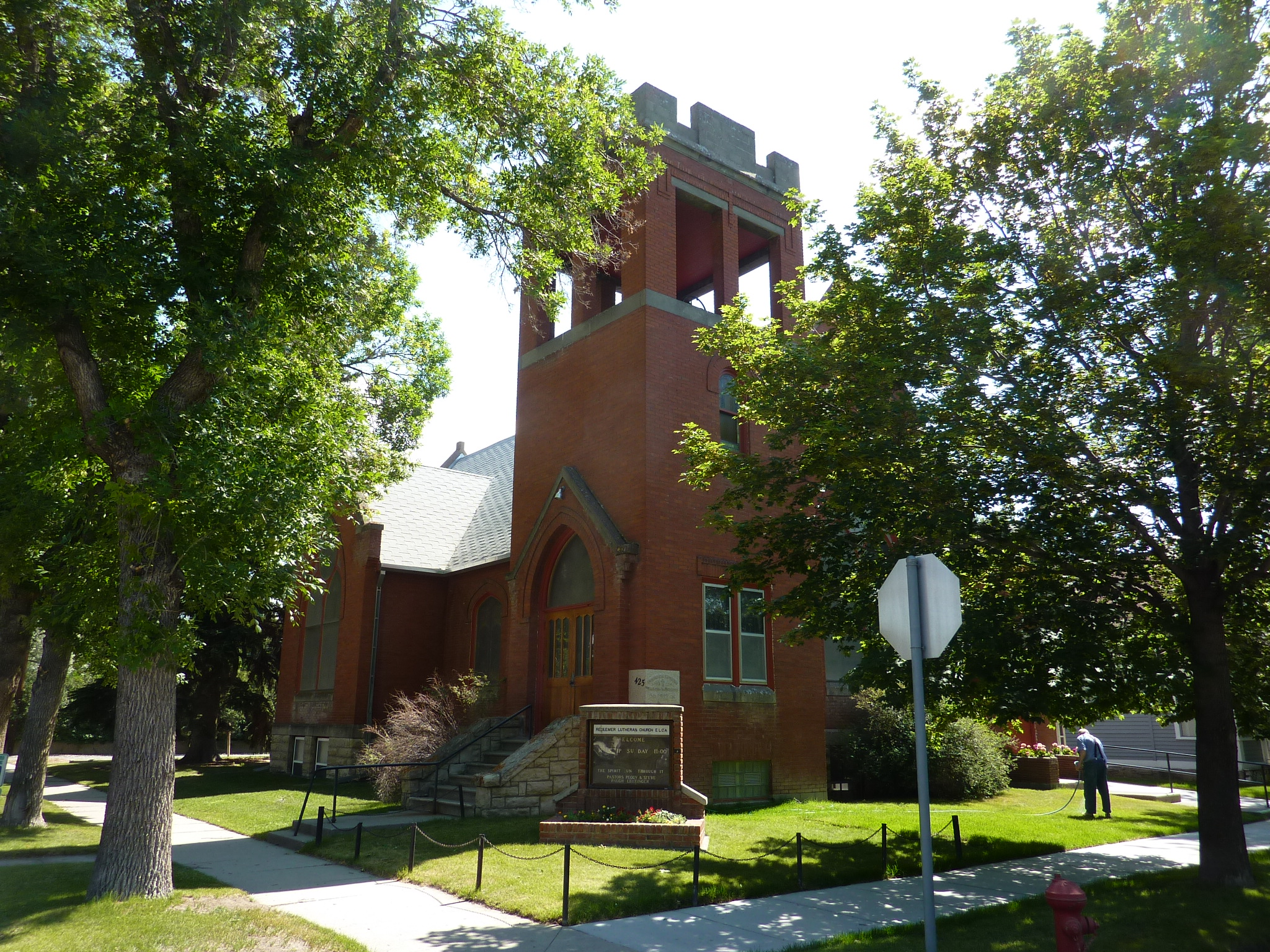
The Redeemer Lutheran Church in Livingston, Montana, used for the Presbyterian church scenes

Although both the book and movie are set in Missoula and on the Blackfoot River, it was filmed in late June to early July 1991 in south central Montana in Livingston and Bozeman, and on the nearby upper Yellowstone, Gallatin, and Boulder Rivers. The waterfall shown is Granite Falls, in the mountains 18 miles (29 km) southwest of Jackson, Wyoming. Filming was completed in early September 1991.

An article published in the Helena Independent Record in July 2000, based on recollections of people who knew both brothers, noted a number of specifics about the Macleans — notably various chronological and educational details about Paul Maclean's adult life — that differ somewhat from their portrayal in the film and novella.

=== Music ===
Mark Isham, who would go on to compose the scores to most Robert Redford-directed films, composed the musical score for the film. Originally, Elmer Bernstein was hired to score the film. However, after Redford and Bernstein disagreed over the tone of the music, Bernstein was replaced by Isham. Rushed for time, Isham completed the score within four weeks at Schnee Studio of Signet Sound Studios in Hollywood, California. Upon release, the music was met with positive reviews earning the film nominations for both Grammy and Academy Awards. The A River Runs Through It (Original Motion Picture Soundtrack) was released on October 27, 1992.

== Release ==
Cineplex Odeon as well as Carolco Pictures and its company Seven Arts were attached as distributors of the film at various points during pre-production. Michael Nathanson, worldwide production president at Columbia Pictures, kept close contact with Redford for one and a half years before the studio was shown a rough cut of the film. Columbia ultimately won the domestic distribution rights to it for $8 million in May 1992, beating out Paramount Pictures, Warner Bros. and the Walt Disney Studios; this would mark Columbia's first acquisition of a completed film since Mark Canton became its head in 1991.

The film premiered at the Toronto International Film Festival on September 11, 1992, followed by benefit screenings in Bozeman, Montana on September 19 and at the AMPAS Theater on October 2. The film's Bozeman screening raised several thousand dollars, donated towards the restoration of the Big Blackfoot River, while the AMPAS screening raised $45,000 for Redford's Sundance Institute. Its limited theatrical release began in the United States on October 9, 1992, with twelve screens, which doubled the following week and expanded to 130 in the third week. On October 30, 1992, having grossed $2.9 million domestically in 19 days, the number of screens expanded to 800.

=== Home media ===
A River Runs Through It was originally released on VHS and LaserDisc on May 19, 1993. It was released on DVD in 1999 and a deluxe DVD edition in 2005 in similar packaging style as Legends Of The Fall, which also received a deluxe edition DVD release that year. It was reissued on Blu-ray in July 2009 by Sony Pictures with six extra features including 17 deleted scenes and a documentary titled Deep Currents: Making 'A River Runs Through It' with interview segments of the cast and crew.

== Reception ==
=== Box office ===
Released on October 9, 1992, the film grossed $43,440,294 in the United States and Canada. In 1993, it grossed $22.9 million for a worldwide total of over $66 million.

=== Critical response ===
On Rotten Tomatoes, the film holds an approval rating of 80% based on 45 reviews, with an average rating of 6.79/10. The site's critics consensus reads: "Tasteful to a fault, this period drama combines a talented cast (including a young Brad Pitt) with some stately, beautifully filmed work from director Robert Redford." On Metacritic, the film has a weighted average score of 68 out of 100, based on 21 critics, indicating "generally favorable" reviews. Audiences polled by CinemaScore gave the film an average grade of "A−" on an A+ to F scale.

Roger Ebert of The Chicago Sun-Times gave the film 3.5 out of 4 stars. He wrote:

Redford and his writer, Richard Friedenberg, understand that most of the events in any life are accidental or arbitrary, especially the crucial ones, and we can exercise little conscious control over our destinies.

Much of the praise focused on Pitt's portrayal of Paul, which has been cited as his career-making performance. Despite the critical reception, Pitt was very critical of his performance on the film: "Robert Redford made a quality movie. But I don't think I was skilled enough. I think I could have done better. Maybe it was the pressure of the part, and playing someone who was a real person — and the family was around occasionally — and not wanting to let Redford down."

=== Accolades ===
Award	Category	Nominee(s)	Result
20/20 Awards	Best Adapted Screenplay	Richard Friedenberg	Nominated
20/20 Awards	Best Cinematography	Philippe Rousselot	Nominated
Academy Awards	Best Screenplay – Based on Material Previously Produced or Published	Richard Friedenberg	Nominated
Academy Awards	Best Cinematography	Philippe Rousselot	Won
Academy Awards	Best Original Score	Mark Isham	Nominated
American Society of Cinematographers Awards	Outstanding Achievement in Cinematography in Theatrical Releases	Philippe Rousselot	Nominated
Artios Awards	Best Casting for Feature Film – Drama	Elisabeth Leustig	Nominated
Awards Circuit Community Awards	Best Cinematography	Philippe Rousselot	Nominated
Awards Circuit Community Awards	Best Original Score	Mark Isham	Nominated
Golden Globe Awards	Best Director – Motion Picture	Robert Redford	Nominated
Grammy Awards	Best Instrumental Composition Written for a Motion Picture or for Television	Mark Isham	Nominated
Kinema Junpo Awards	Best Foreign Language Film	Robert Redford	Won
Los Angeles Film Critics Association Awards	Best Music Score	Mark Isham	Runner-up
USC Scripter Awards		Richard Friedenberg (screenwriter); Norman Maclean (author)	Won
Young Artist Awards	Best Young Actor Under 10 in a Motion Picture	Joseph Gordon-Levitt	Won

== Legacy ==
The following quote from the film, which is not present in the novella, is displayed at the base of the statue of Michael Jordan at Chicago's United Center:

"At that moment I knew, surely and clearly, that I was witnessing perfection. He stood before us, suspended above the earth, free from all its laws like a work of art, and I knew, just as surely and clearly, that life is not a work of art, and that the moment could not last."

The film also had a profound impact on the sport of fly fishing and the fly fishing industry. Popularity of the sport grew dramatically. In the two years following the film's release, the fly fishing industry more than doubled in size.
