= Storm King Mountain (Garfield County, Colorado) =

Mountain in Colorado, United States

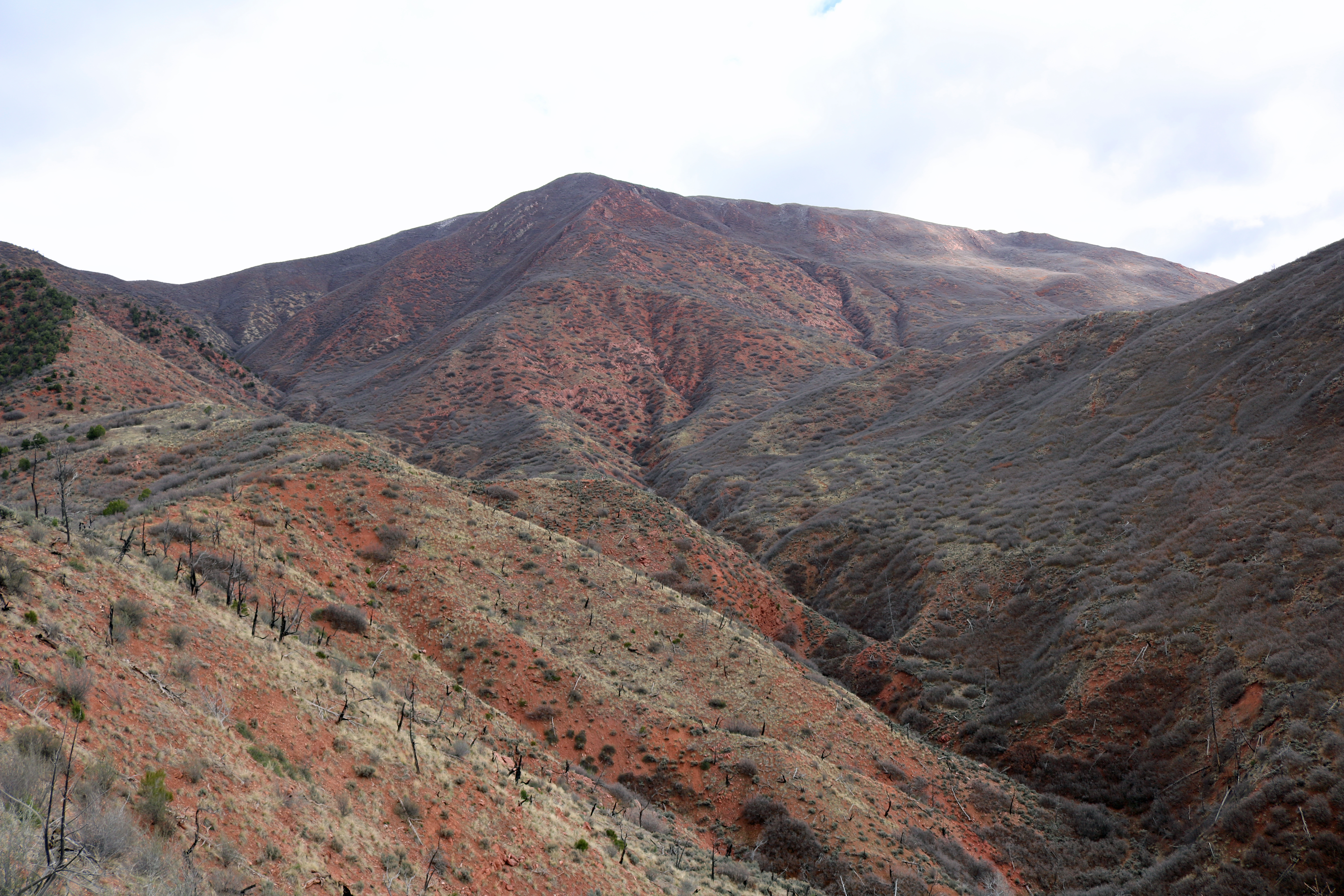
- The mountain in 2017.

Highest point
- Elevation: 8,797 ft (2,681 m)
- Coordinates: 39°35′22″N 107°24′03″W

Geography
- Location within Colorado
- Location: Garfield County, Colorado, U.S.
- Parent range: White River Plateau
- Topo map(s): USGS 7.5' topographic map Storm King Mountain, Colorado

Geology
- Rock age: ~ 1.05 Gyr
- Mountain type: sandstone

Climbing
- Easiest route: hike

Storm King Mountain is a mountain in the White River National Forest of the Rocky Mountains, 5 miles (8.0 km) northwest of Glenwood Springs, Colorado, in northeastern Garfield County. It is on the north side of the Colorado River and Interstate 70 (I-70), between Glenwood Springs and New Castle. A Ski lift at Copper Mountain is named after the mountain.

== July 1994 fire ==
It is the site of the July 1994 South Canyon Fire in which 14 firefighters died. After the fire eliminated valuable vegetation and ground cover, torrential rains caused a mudslide on the night of September 1, 1994, that buried 30 cars and seriously injured two people on Interstate 70.

== See also ==
- List of Colorado mountain ranges
- List of Colorado mountain summits
  - List of Colorado fourteeners
  - List of Colorado 4000 meter prominent summits
  - List of the most prominent summits of Colorado
- List of Colorado county high points
