= A River Runs Through It (book) =

1976 story collection by Norman MacLean

A River Runs Through It and Other Stories
- First edition cover
- Author: Norman Maclean
- Language: English
- Genre: Autobiographical, novella, anthology
- Publisher: University of Chicago Press
- Publication date: May 1976
- Publication place: United States
- Media type: Print (hardback and paperback)
- Pages: 231 pages (hardback edition); 238 pages (paperback edition)
- ISBN: 978-0-226-50055-3 (hardback edition); ISBN 978-0-226-50058-4 (paperback edition); ISBN 978-0-226-50057-7 (paperback movie tie-in edition); ISBN 978-0-226-50072-0 (hardback 25th anniversary edition); ISBN 978-0-226-50066-9 (paperback 25th anniversary edition)
- OCLC: 1733412
- Dewey Decimal: 813/.54 19
- LC Class: PZ4.M16345 Ri PS3563.A317993

A River Runs Through It and Other Stories is a semi-autobiographical collection of three stories by American author Norman Maclean (1902–1990) published in 1976. It was the first work of fiction published by the University of Chicago Press.

The collection contains the novella A River Runs Through It and two short stories, "Logging and Pimping and 'Your pal, Jim'" and "USFS 1919: The Ranger, the Cook, and a Hole in the Sky", which precede the events of the novella. It received widespread acclaim upon its publication and was nominated for the Pulitzer Prize in Letters in 1977, but the selection committee ultimately did not award the prize in that category that year. Two of the stories were later adapted into feature films.

== A River Runs Through It ==
Locations in western Montana from A River Runs Through It

A River Runs Through It is a semi-autobiographical account of Maclean's relationship with his brother Paul and their upbringing in an early 20th century Montana family in which "there was no clear line between religion and fly fishing." Pete Dexter, in a 1981 profile of Maclean in Esquire magazine, described the novella:

It is a story about Maclean and his brother, Paul, who was beaten to death with a gun butt in 1938. It is about not understanding what you love, about not being able to help. It is the truest story I ever read; it might be the best written. And to this day it won't leave me alone. I thought for a while it was the writing that kept bringing it around. That's the way it comes back to me: I hear the sound of the words, then I see them happen. I spent four hours one afternoon picking out three paragraphs to drop into a column I was writing about the book, and in the end they didn’t translate, because except for the first sentence—'In our family, there was no clear line between religion and fly-fishing'—there isn’t anything in it that doesn’t depend on what comes before it for its meaning.

As he describes his brother's alcoholism and gambling addiction, Maclean also explores how both afflictions have always followed the history of his family, even back to their earliest origins among Scottish Gaelic-speaking Presbyterians on the Isle of Mull.

The story is noted for using detailed descriptions of fishing and the Montana landscape to engage with a number of profound metaphysical questions. In a review for the Chicago Tribune, critic Alfred Kazin stated: "There are passages here of physical rapture in the presence of unsullied primitive America that are as beautiful as anything in Thoreau and Hemingway".

== "Logging and Pimping and 'Your pal, Jim'" ==
"Logging and Pimping and 'Your pal, Jim'" tells the story of Maclean working as a logger for the Anaconda Company at a logging camp on the Blackfoot River during the summer of 1928, when he was 25 and in graduate school. At the end of the previous summer working at the camp (1927), Maclean had made an arrangement to work the next summer with the camp's best logger, Jim Grierson. Maclean describes how Grierson would work the logging season at a camp, then find a town with a nice Carnegie Public Library, get a library card, find a prostitute, preferably from the South, and spend the off-season reading, drinking, and having a relationship with the woman.

== "USFS 1919: The Ranger, the Cook, and a Hole in the Sky" ==
"USFS 1919: The Ranger, the Cook, and a Hole in the Sky" tells of part of the summer of Maclean's 17th year, 1919. He spent that summer, as he had the previous two, working for the United States Forest Service, this time at Elk Summit, Idaho, west of Blodgett Canyon and approximately 34 miles (55 km) walking distance almost due west-northwest of Hamilton, Montana, near White Sand Creek, and north of East Fork Moose Creek.

Working for the Forest Service in a very remote part of the Selway-Bitterroot Wilderness in the Selway National Forest (now Clearwater National Forest), Maclean had to extinguish wildfires, build trails (with a sledgehammer, chisel, and dynamite), pack horses and mules, spend time alone on lookout duty at 7,424 feet (2,263 m) Grave Peak, and string telephone wire.

The Elk Summit Work Center is located at the junction of Horse Creek and Hoodoo Creek, north-northwest of Hoodoo Mountain and north-northeast of Hoodoo Lake, at 46°19′36″N 114°38′51″W (46.3265874, −114.6476053) and an elevation of 5,748 feet (1,752 m).

== Publishing history ==
A River Runs Through It and Other Stories was first published by the University of Chicago Press in May 1976. This first edition included a jacket illustration and several spot drawings and vignettes, created on scratchboard by the book's designer, Robert Williams. Williams's illustrations were retained in several subsequent printings and editions of the book. For the first paperback edition, Williams's blue jacket design was replaced by a landscape photograph by John B. Roberts showing Seeley Lake and surrounding forests, the site of Norman Maclean's cabin. In 1983, the University of Chicago Press published an illustrated edition of the title novella with color photographs by Joel Snyder and a new postscript by Maclean commenting on the photographs.

In 1989, the University of Chicago Press and Pennyroyal Press collaborated to publish an edition designed and illustrated with woodcuts by "America's preeminent booksmith" Barry Moser, which remains in print. Moser's engravings include a portrait of Norman Maclean's brother Paul, an illustration of Paul's fishing hat, and illustrations of trout flies tied by George Croonenberghs, who tied flies for the Maclean family. "On the reverse of each illustrated page we find the fly's colloquial name and brief advice on how it may be fished." Pennyroyal Press published a collector's edition of the illustrated volume limited to 200 copies signed by Maclean and Moser.

With the release of Robert Redford's film adaptation of A River Runs through It, the University of Chicago Press licensed a mass-market, movie tie-in edition to Pocket Books and released a trade paperback edition with a re-designed cover featuring a painting by Russell Chatham. In 2001, the University of Chicago Press published a twenty-fifth anniversary edition of A River Runs through It and Other Stories with a foreword by Annie Proulx. In 2017, the press replaced that edition with a newly typeset and designed edition featuring a foreword by Robert Redford.

== Pulitzer Prize ==
In 1977, the Pulitzer Prize committee for Fiction (a.k.a. "fiction jury") recommended A River Runs Through It be awarded the prize for that year. The Pulitzer Prize Board, which has final say for awarding the prize, chose to override their recommendation and decided not to award for fiction that year. Pete Dexter wrote in 1981 that the board called it "a lean year for fiction" but speculated about their true reasons: "I know just enough about the Pulitzer people to guess that what happened was that one of them noticed the trees too."

== Adaptations ==
=== A River Runs Through It ===
In 1992, Robert Redford directed a film of the same name starring Brad Pitt, Craig Sheffer, Tom Skerritt, Brenda Blethyn, and Emily Lloyd. It was nominated for three Academy Awards, with Philippe Rousselot winning for his cinematography. The film fueled a rise in the popularity of fly fishing for a number of years before the sport waned to previous levels.

=== The Ranger, the Cook and a Hole in the Sky ===
"USFS 1919: The Ranger, the Cook, and a Hole in the Sky" was adapted into a 1995 ABC television film titled The Ranger, the Cook and a Hole in the Sky, also known simply as Hole in the Sky. The film was directed by John Kent Harrison, with the adaptation written by Robert Wayne, and stars Sam Elliott, Jerry O'Connell, Ricky Jay, and Molly Parker. It was filmed in British Columbia, Canada.
