= Norman Maclean =

American author (1902–1990)

- Maclean in 1970
- Born: December 23, 1902; Clarinda, Iowa, U.S.
- Died: August 2, 1990 (aged 87); Chicago, Illinois, U.S.
- Education: Dartmouth College (BA); University of Chicago (MA, PhD)
- Occupations: Author; Professor of English literature
- Spouse: Jessie Burns (1905–1968)
- Children: 2, including John Maclean
- Parent: John Maclean (father)
- Writing career
- Genres: Nature, fishing, outdoors, biography
- Notable works: A River Runs Through It (1976); Young Men and Fire (1992)

Norman Fitzroy Maclean (December 23, 1902 – August 2, 1990) was an American professor at the University of Chicago who, following his retirement, became a major figure in American literature. Maclean is known for his collection of novellas A River Runs Through It and Other Stories (1976), and the creative nonfiction book Young Men and Fire (1992).

== Family origins ==
In his novella, A River Runs Through It, Maclean wrote that his paternal ancestors were from the Isle of Mull, in the Inner Hebrides of Scotland. According to his son, however, their paternal ancestors were Gaelic speaking Presbyterians and from the Isle of Coll, which is "located about seven miles west of the Clan Maclean stronghold, the Isle of Mull".

Maclean's great-grandfather, Laughlan Maclean, was a carpenter who, accompanied by his wife, Elizabeth Campbell, emigrated to Cape Breton, Nova Scotia, in 1821, before they settled on a homestead in Pictou County.

Maclean's father, Rev. John Norman Maclean, was born on July 28, 1862, to Laughlan's son Norman and his wife Mary MacDonald on the family farm in Marshy Hope, Pictou County, Nova Scotia where much of the community spoke Canadian Gaelic. John Maclean showed signs of academic promise and trained for the ministry first at Pictou Academy, where academic records refer to him as "J.N. Mclean of Glenbard", Maclean's father completed his education at Dalhousie College in Halifax and at Manitoba College in Winnipeg. MacLean's parents met while his father was riding circuit in the summers among the many small Presbyterian congregations in the pioneer communities of the Pembina Valley Region of Manitoba. His mother, Clara Davidson was a schoolmarm. Maclean's maternal grandfather, John Davidson, was a Presbyterian immigrant from Northern England who had first settled near Argenteuil, Laurentides, Quebec, where his daughter Clara was born. Finding the farmland there poor, John Davidson and his family moved west by oxcart and settled on a homestead at New Haven near Manitou, Manitoba. During their courtship, Clara often accompanied John Maclean while he was riding circuit. In 1893, John Maclean completed advanced studies at San Francisco Theological Seminary in San Anselmo, California, and was ordained as a Presbyterian minister. John Maclean and Clara were married in Pembina, Manitoba, on August 1, 1893.

== Biography ==
=== Early life ===
Maclean was born at Clarinda, Iowa, on December 23, 1902, and was the son of Clara Evelyn (née Davidson; 1873–1952) and the Rev. John Norman Maclean (1862–1941). Maclean and his younger brother, Paul Davidson MacLean (1906–1938) were homeschooled by their father until 1913. Maclean recalled about being homeschooled by his father, "I think the most important thing is that he read aloud to us. He was a minister, and every morning after breakfast we had what was called family worship. We'd all sit with our breakfast chairs pulled back from the table and he would read to us from the Bible or from some religious poet. He was a very good reader... that was very good for me because in doing that, he would bring out the rhythms of the Bible. That reading instilled in me this great love of rhythm in language." His father also passed on to both of his sons a passion for fly fishing which he had begun and developed in Clarinda. As a child, Maclean also often witnessed his father, whose first language was the distinctive Nova Scotia dialect of the Scottish Gaelic language, working hard to hide all traces of a foreign accent by learning proper diction and elocution.

In 1909, his family relocated to Missoula, Montana, at the invitation of its Presbyterian church elders. The following years considerably influenced and inspired Maclean's writings, appearing prominently in the short story The Woods, Books, and Truant Officers (1977) and the semi-autobiographical novella A River Runs Through It and Other Stories (1976).

=== Forest Service ===
When Maclean was 14 years old, he found work with the United States Forest Service in the Bitterroot National Forest of northwestern Montana. The novella USFS 1919: The Ranger, the Cook, and a Hole in the Sky and the story "Black Ghost" in Young Men and Fire (1992) are semi-fictionalized accounts of these experiences.

=== Dartmouth ===
Maclean later attended Dartmouth College, where he served as editor-in-chief of the humor magazine the Dartmouth Jack-O-Lantern. His successor as editor-in-chief was Theodor Geisel, better known as Dr. Seuss, whom Maclean described as "the craziest guy I ever met." He was also a member of the Sphinx and Beta Theta Pi.

During a 1986 interview, Maclean described the "privilege" he felt having taken creative writing classes at Dartmouth by the poet Robert Frost. In the same interview, Maclean recalled that Ernest Hemingway "was an idol of mine for a while. . . . I don't see how you could be a real American writer unless you knew Hemingway well, and had learned a great deal from him."

Maclean received his Bachelor of Arts in 1924 and chose to remain in Hanover, New Hampshire, to serve as an instructor until 1926, a time he recalled in "This Quarter I Am Taking McKeon: A Few Remarks on the Art of Teaching".

=== Personal life ===
Maclean met his future wife, Jessie Burns, during a December party in the Helena valley. They were returning home after the party with another couple in Jessie's car, when a blizzard descended and the car's radiator froze. He tried pouring water in, only to have the water freeze as well. He then started hiking through the blizzard to seek help but soon found that the car had caught up with him, as the cold had prevented the engine from overheating. He felt foolish, but Jessie always considered him the hero of the blizzard. He and Burns married on September 24, 1931, and had two children: daughter Jean Maclean Snyder (1942–2025), who was an attorney, and son John Norman Maclean (born in 1943), who became a journalist and author.

Following their marriage, Jessie handled the family's finances and wrote all the checks. Jessie's "open personality" made her a lot of friends at the University of Chicago. It was often said of her in later years, "She was the only one who'd talk to the young faculty wives." During a 1986 interview, Maclean recalled, "I love Chicago. My wife was very wonderful in helping me come to feel that. I was very provincial in a lot of ways. She was gay and loved life wherever she lived. She really worked me over in our early years in Chicago. I was insolent and provincial about that city. She made me see how beautiful it was, made me see the geometric and industrial and architectural beauty." Dr. Sidney Schulman later said of Jessie's role at the university, "Jessie knew what was to be said. She said less than she knew, but what she said was enough and she said it with humor, with literary allusions and with simplicity. She came to be a sort of housemother. In being this, she was unaware of it - no self-satisfied awareness that what she was doing was noble. She was not playacting. It was part of her existence." Jessie died in 1968, of emphysema and cancer of the esophagus, the result of decades of chain smoking.

Maclean's family always led two lives, according to his son. One life was during the summers at the log cabin built by Maclean's father near Seeley Lake, Montana. The other life took place in Chicago during the academic year.

Maclean gave up typing and wrote almost everything, including his books, "in a cramped longhand that generations of typists at the University and elsewhere prided themselves on learning to decipher."

=== Murder of Paul Maclean ===
Maclean's younger brother, Paul Davidson Maclean, similarly graduated from Dartmouth and became well known as an investigative journalist who exposed political corruption in the state capital of Helena, Montana, by politicians linked to the powerful Anaconda Copper Mining Company. Paul later worked alongside Maclean and his wife at the University of Chicago during the Jazz Age and the Depression era. Paul had talents in writing and fly fishing but became an alcoholic, addicted gambler, notorious brawler, and a womanizer. Maclean suggested these behaviors had a long generational history and could be traced to the Maclean family's earliest origins among the Gaels of the Inner Hebrides of Scotland.

On the early morning of May 2, 1938, Paul was attacked and brutally beaten at 63rd Street and Drexel Avenue in Chicago. According to the testimony of an eyewitness, two men drove away from the scene in a car. Paul was taken to nearby Woodlawn Hospital where he never regained consciousness and died at 1:20 pm the same day. According to Maclean and statements made to the press by Detective Sergeant Ignatius Sheehan, evidence indicated Paul fought back against his assailants, so much so that the medical examiner found nearly all the bones in his right hand to have been broken. Following a homicide investigation led by Sheehan, Chicago Police Department Captain Mark Boyle testified at the Cook County Coroner's inquest that he believed Paul's murder to be a mugging gone bad, which remains the official police explanation. Another widely held theory at the time was that Paul's murderers were linked to organized crime and the murder was over Maclean's refusal or inability to pay them an illegal gambling or loansharking debt. No arrests were ever made and the case remains unsolved.

Maclean accompanied his brother's casket, alone, on an overnight train trip from Chicago to Montana. After the funeral, Maclean spent several weeks of compassionate leave with his parents at their family's cabin at Seeley Lake.

Maclean's father was skeptical of the official explanation for his son's murder and asked Maclean, "Do you think it was just a stick-up and foolishly he tried to fight his way out? You know what I mean -- that it wasn't connected to anything in his past?" Maclean replied that the Chicago Police Department didn't know and that neither did he. Maclean later wrote that his father aged rapidly following Paul's murder and that, "Like many Scottish ministers before him, he had to derive what comfort he could from the faith that his son had died fighting." A few years later, before his death in 1941, Maclean's father brought up Maclean's fondness for writing nonfiction and advised, "After you have finished your true stories sometime, why don't you make up a story and the people to go with it? Only then will you understand what happened and why. It is those we live with and love and should know who elude us."

During visits to the cabin at Seeley Lake in later years, his son often heard Maclean calling out over the lake in the evenings, "Paul! Paul!"

=== University of Chicago ===
Maclean began graduate studies in English at the University of Chicago in 1928 and earned a PhD in 1940.

Like his contemporary C.S. Lewis, Maclean acquired a reputation for personal magnetism and for making the writings of difficult Medieval authors like François Rabelais and Geoffrey Chaucer come alive in the lecture hall. One of his students later said, "Maclean is one of the best liked guys around this place. He is best remembered because when we were freshmen we used to come to class only when he lectured. His classes were always overrun." According to another of his students, the scholar and poet Marie Borroff, Maclean was considered a unique figure at the university because he came from a "wilderness outpost", was a gifted marksman with a rifle, played a rough game of handball and was every bit as much of an expert on George Armstrong Custer as he was on Aristotle.

During World War II, Maclean declined a commission in the Office of Naval Intelligence to serve as dean of students. During the war, he also served as director of the Institute on Military Studies and co-authored Manual of Instruction in Military Maps and Aerial Photographs.

Maclean eventually became the William Rainey Harper Professor in the Department of English and taught the Romantic poets and Shakespeare. "Every year I said to myself, 'You better teach this bastard so you don't forget what great writing is like.' I taught him technically, two whole weeks for the first scene from Hamlet. I'd spend the first day on just the line, 'Who's there?'"

U.S. Supreme Court Justice John Paul Stevens took a poetry class taught by Maclean at the University of Chicago and later called him, "the teacher to whom I am most indebted." Maclean received the Llewellyn John and Harriet Manchester Quantrell Awards for Excellence in Undergraduate Teaching in 1941 and 1973.

Maclean also wrote two scholarly articles, "From Action to Image: Theories of the Lyric in the Eighteenth Century" and "Episode, Scene, Speech, and Word: The Madness of Lear", the latter describing a theory of tragedy that he revisited in his later work.

=== Retirement and literary career ===
After his retirement in 1973, Maclean began, as his children Jean and John had often encouraged him, to write down the stories he liked to tell.

As his father had urged, Maclean wrote an iconic and slightly fictionalized novella about his relationship with his parents and, even more so, with his brother Paul, beginning with their childhood together in Missoula and particularly focusing on the last summer in Montana before Paul's murder in 1938. According to his son, John Norman Maclean, "The portrait Norman managed to create in A River Runs through It gave Paul a lasting afterlife as the charming rebel, doomed but beautiful and gifted with a fly rod. He was forever the younger brother who struggled for an independent life and went down fighting. Norman's vision of him, though, brought the consolation of shared experience, taken to an eloquent level, to a host of brothers and sisters who have reached out to wayward siblings only to see them twist and dodge away as Paul did." The resulting novella was included with two other stories in the book A River Runs Through It and Other Stories. Pete Dexter, in a 1981 profile of Maclean in Esquire magazine, described the novella, "It is a story about Maclean and his brother, Paul, who was beaten to death with a gun butt in 1938. It is about not understanding what you love, about not being able to help. It is the truest story I ever read; it might be the best written. And to this day it won't leave me alone."

The second story in the book is "Logging and Pimping and 'Your pal, Jim'." The third story describes Maclean's employment as a teenager by the United States Forest Service and is titled "USFS 1919: The Ranger, the Cook, and a Hole in the Sky." In 1976, A River Runs Through It and Other Stories became the first work of fiction ever published by the University of Chicago Press. The book received enthusiastic reviews, with Publishers Weekly calling it a "stunning debut." It was nominated by a selection committee to receive the Pulitzer Prize in Letters in 1977 but no Pulitzer award was made in the category that year.

In a May 26, 1976, letter to Nick Lyons, Maclean explained that "Retrievers Good and Bad" had been the first story he attempted after retirement, that it was about his brother, and that he considered it "both a moral and artistic failure." Despite his misgivings about the essay, Maclean published "Retrievers Good and Bad" in Esquire in 1977. That year another essay, "The Woods, Books, and Truant Officers," was published in Chicago magazine. Both essays were anthologized along with a selection of other short writings by Maclean, two interviews and "essays in appreciation and criticism" in the 1988 volume Norman Maclean. They were collected again in The Norman Maclean Reader (2008).

In a 1986 interview, Maclean expressed contempt for New York City publishers: "Not until recently have the Western writers ever gotten a good break from the publishers in New York." He recalled that A River Runs Through It had been rejected by Alfred A. Knopf and that when Knopf later approached him about his second book, "I really told those bastards off" in a letter that was "probably one of the best things I ever wrote." That 1981 "middle finger of a letter," to Knopf editor Charles Elliott, concludes, "if the situation ever arose when Alfred A. Knopf was the only publishing house remaining in the world and I was the sole surviving author, that would mark the end of the world of books." In that 1986 interview MacLean added, "I had the good fortune of having a dream come true. I'm sure every rejected writer must dream of a time when he's written something that was rejected which turns out to be quite successful, so that all the publishers who rejected him are now coming around and kissing his ass at high noon, and he can tell them where to go."

By the time Maclean's A River Runs through It and Other Stories was published, he had begun researching a book about the 13 smokejumpers who lost their lives fighting the 1949 Mann Gulch Forest Fire. Maclean's letters, some of them gathered in The Norman Maclean Reader, "attest to his periodic doubts as well as his determination to finish and publish the large manuscript he initially called 'The Great Blow-Up,' and later Young Men and Fire," according to the Reader's editor, O. Alan Weltzien. That book was published posthumously in 1992 as Young Men and Fire by the University of Chicago Press and won the National Book Critics Circle Award.

== Death ==
During his last years, Maclean collaborated with several others in attempting to adapt A River Runs Through It into a screenplay. He also struggled to finish Young Men and Fire as his health declined, and because "at the end he lived more for telling and retelling the story — for getting it right — than for publishing it." In late May, 1987, he suffered a serious fall at home, lying incapacitated for several hours before calling for help. It "marked 'the beginning of the end for him,'" and resulted in cognitive decline that forced him to stop work on the unfinished Mann Gulch manuscript. Maclean died in Chicago on August 2, 1990, at the age of 87. He left his manuscript of Young Men and Fire unfinished. At his own request, Maclean's body was cremated and his ashes were scattered over the mountains of Montana.

== Legacy ==
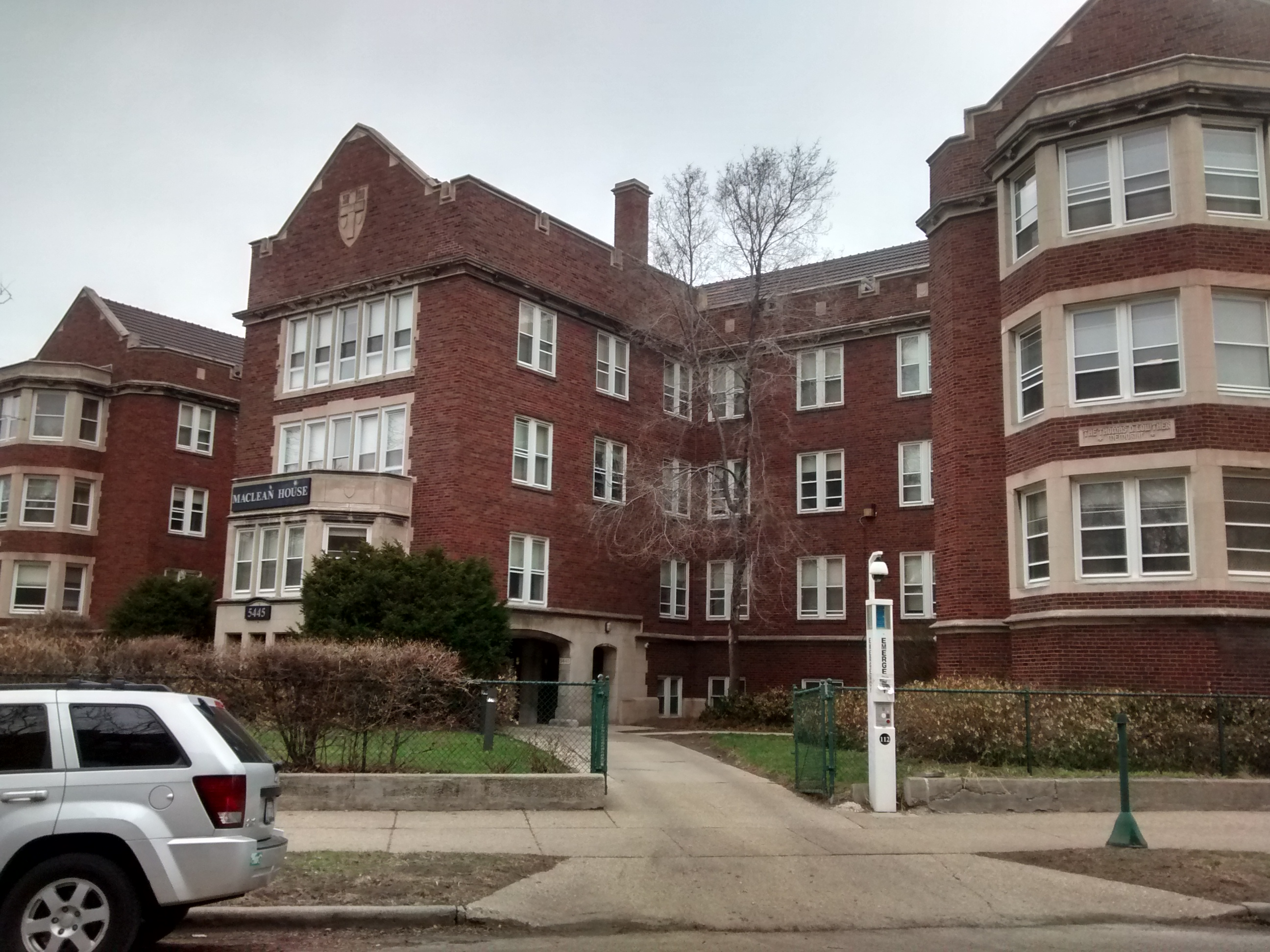
Maclean House (1991–2016), 5445 S. Ingleside Avenue

In 1991, a renovated church retirement home was turned into an undergraduate dormitory on the University of Chicago campus named Maclean House. Maclean House's mascot was the "Stormin' Normans" in honor of its namesake. The dorm was closed after the 2015–2016 academic year, subsequently sold and turned into apartments.

In 2008, the University of Chicago Press published a new compendium of unpublished and some previously published works, The Norman Maclean Reader. The anthology included parts of a never-finished book about George Armstrong Custer and the Battle of the Little Bighorn which Maclean had worked on from 1959 to 1963. Publishers Weekly gave the book a respectful review in the summer of 2008, remarking, "Readers of the two earlier books will find, as Weltzien [Alan Weltzien, the book's editor] phrases it, 'new biographical insights into one of the most remarkable and unexpected careers in American letters.'"

In May 2024, University of Washington Press published Norman Maclean: A Life of Letters and Rivers by Rebecca McCarthy, his friend and former University of Chicago student. The book occasioned a major essay on Maclean in the New Yorker by Kathryn Schulz, in which she writes, "His status has always been ambiguous—too celebrated to count as a cult favorite, too marginal to be a favorite over all—and his cultural standing peaked in the nineteen-nineties, after Robert Redford made the title story of A River Runs Through It into an Academy Award-winning movie.... His great gift was for capturing our relationship to the elemental things: fire and water, mountains and rivers, death and love.... He reminds me that language is also an elemental thing, that our connection to it is primal, and that the number of things that can be done with it is infinite."

== Literary works ==
=== Books ===
- 1940: The Theory of Lyric Poetry from the Renaissance to Coleridge
- 1943: A Manual of Instruction in Military Maps and Aerial Photographs (with Everett C. Olson)
- 1976: A River Runs Through It and Other Stories (Illustrated by Barry Moser in 1989)
- 1992: Young Men and Fire

=== Articles and essays ===
- 1952: Two essays—(1) "From Action to Image: Theories of the Lyric in the Eighteenth Century" and (2) "Episode, Scene, Speech, and Word: The Madness of Lear" and (2) —in R.S. Crane's Critics and Criticism: Ancient and Modern
- 1956: "Personification But Not Poetry" in ELH: English Literary History Vol. 23, No. 2 (Jun., 1956), pp. 163–170.

=== Edited works ===
- 1988: Norman Maclean (edited by Ron McFarland and Hugh Nichols)
- 2008: The Norman Maclean Reader (edited by O. Alan Weltzien)

== In popular culture ==
- In 1992, Maclean's novella A River Runs Through It was adapted into a motion picture directed by Robert Redford and released by Columbia Pictures, starring Craig Sheffer as Norman Maclean, Brad Pitt as Paul Davidson Maclean, Brenda Blethyn as Clara Davidson Maclean, Emily Lloyd as Jessie Burns and Tom Skerritt as Rev. John Norman Maclean
- Maclean's other novella from the same collection, USFS 1919: The Ranger, the Cook, and a Hole in the Sky was adapted into a 1995 ABC television film titled The Ranger, the Cook and a Hole in the Sky, also known simply as Hole in the Sky. The film was directed by John Kent Harrison, with the adaptation written by Robert Wayne and stars Sam Elliott, Jerry O'Connell, Ricky Jay and Molly Parker. It was filmed in British Columbia, Canada.
