= Mann Gulch Fire: Timeline =

Natural disaster in Montana, USA

Coordinates: 46.8796°N 111.9049°W

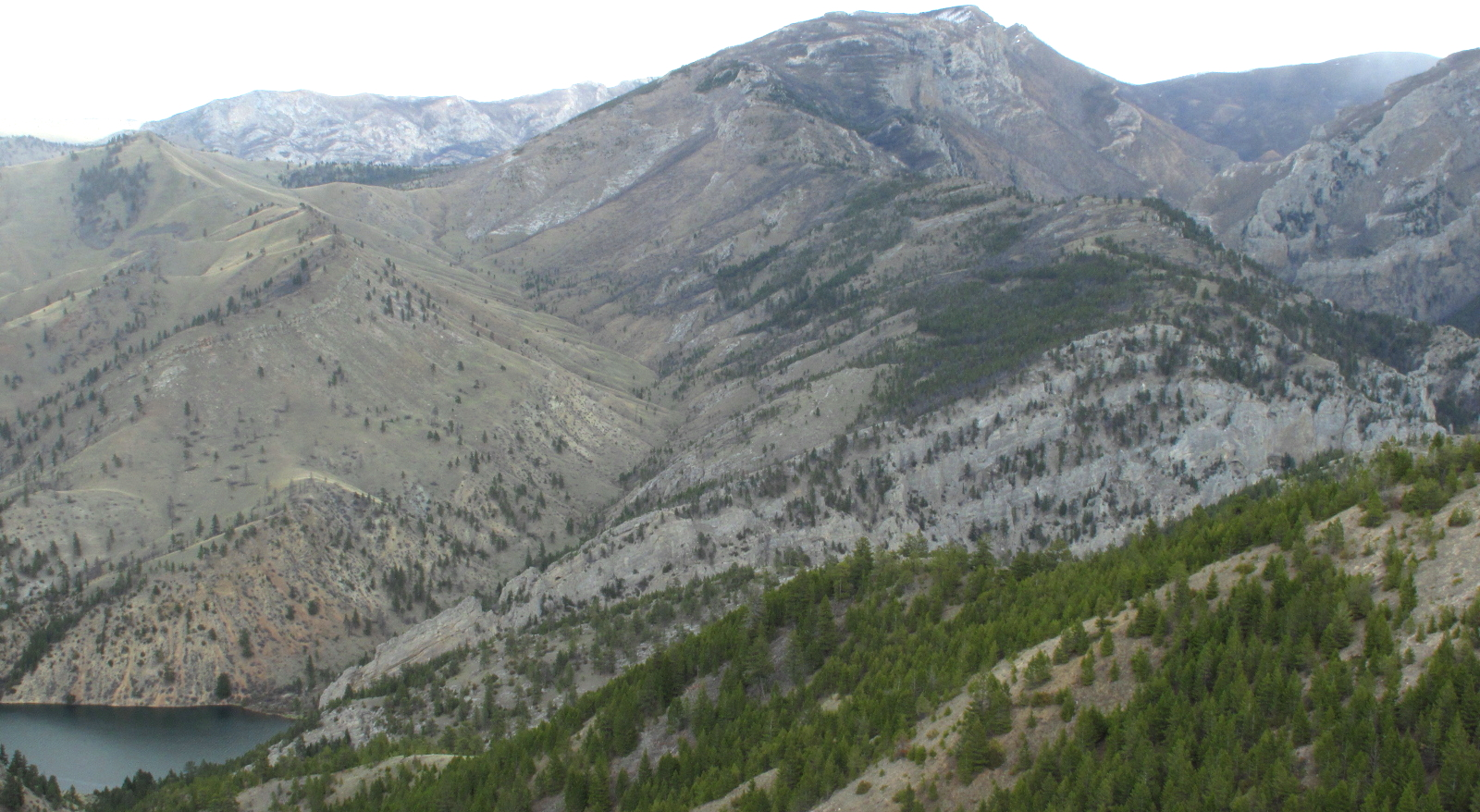
- Looking east up Mann Gulch from the Missouri River, May 2013

The Mann Gulch fire was a wildfire reported on August 5, 1949, in a gulch located along the upper Missouri River in the Gates of the Mountains Wilderness (then known as the Gates of the Mountains Wild Area), Helena National Forest, in the state of Montana in the United States. A team of 15 US Forest Service smokejumpers parachuted into the area on the afternoon of August 5, 1949, to fight a 50–60 acres (20–24 ha) lightning-caused blaze, assisted by a local recreation guard. As the team approached the fire, an unexpected change in wind direction caused the fire to ignite heavy fuels, creating a "blowup" and cutting off the men's escape route to the Missouri River. The crew was forced to retreat uphill into a lightly timbered area with a dense groundcover of extremely flammable grass and brush. The fire moved rapidly up the slope, burning 3,000 acres (1,200 ha) in ten minutes and claiming the lives of 13 firefighters, including 12 of the smokejumpers. Only three of the smokejumpers survived. The fire would continue for five more days before being controlled.

== Timeline of Events ==
The following chronology combines two parallel narratives: 1) Canyon Ferry District Ranger John Robert Jansson's effort to provide support for the smokejumpers and 2) the events surrounding the deaths of the 13 crewmen led by foreman R. Wagner Dodge in Mann Gulch.

4 August 1949

4:00 pm – An intense electrical storm passed over Gates of the Mountains Wild Area, sparking eight fires. John Robert Jansson, Canyon Ferry District Ranger, quickly organized the suppression of the four fires that had been reported in his jurisdiction. A lightning strike on the upper south slope of Mann Gulch (within the Canyon Ferry RD) produced a holdover fire (a so-called "sleeper") that initially went undetected. Fire danger rating on 4 August was not critical, ranking 16 out of a possible 100, but temperatures in recent days had been in the upper 90s °F (upper 30s °C) with low humidity. The cooler and wetter 1948 summer had provided for a prolific grass understory and seed production in the spring of 1949.

Concerned about sleeper fires, Jansson requested an aerial survey of the district for 6:00 am on the following day, 5 August.

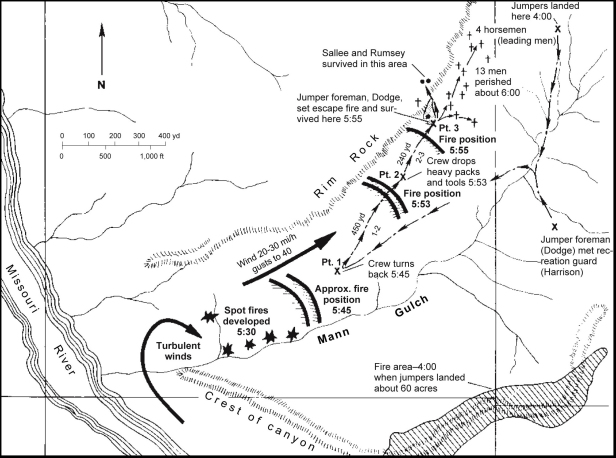
Figure 1. Mann Gulch Fire, map of events, 5 August 1949

5 August 1949

8:00 am – US Forest Service aerial observers report no new fires at Mann Gulch.

9:00 am (approx.) – Ranger Jansson contacted James O. Harrison, former smokejumper and recreation guard at the Meriwether Canyon guard station and directed him to conduct a foot patrol in Mann Gulch to search for possible sleeper fires.

11:00 am – Jansson flew observation over Mann Gulch, but saw no evidence of fire and returned to the Helena airport.

11:30 am ("late morning") – Jim Harrison located a new fire on Mann Gulch.

12:15 pm – Harrison attempted to report the fire to Missoula office and the Canyon Ferry RD by radio, but was unable to establish contact. He climbed 1,500 feet (460 meters) from the Meriwether Guard Station to reach the fire perimeter and began to work on the blaze with his Pulaski about 1:30 pm.

12:18 pm – Colorado Mountain Lookout, 30 miles away, reported smoke in Mann Gulch. Jansson, arriving back at Helena airport detected smoke on the district, but was perplexed because he just flew Mann Gulch and had seen nothing.

12:55 pm –Returning to Mann Gulch to fly a second survey, Jansson located a 6 to 8 acres (2.4 to 3.2 ha) fire along the upper south slope of the gulch. He considered the rate of growth of the sleeper "unusual" and "exceptional."

1:00 pm (early afternoon) – Jansson begins to assemble and mobilize ground crews to fight the Mann Gulch fire.

1:45 pm – Helena National Forest Supervisor Arthur Duncan Moir believed the fire required a rapid response and ordered the deployment of twenty-five smokejumpers to the remote site. The blaze was regarded as manageable for a small firefighting crew until a larger ground crew arrived.

== Mobilization ==
2:30 pm – A C-47 departed from Missoula's Hale Field, 100 miles (160 kilometers) west of the gulch carrying 16 jumpers and their equipment – the airplanes maximum capacity. (Additional smokejumpers were available for action, but all other transport planes were engaged on other projects). The smokejumpers, including the foreman, ranged in age from 17 to 33 (average age, 22). The majority of the firefighters were attending forestry classes at the Montana State University in Missoula. For most of them, this was their first year in the smokejumper program.

2:30 – 4:30 pm – Jansson and his alternate, Ranger Harry Hersey, recruited nineteen able-bodied ground firefighters, just three of whom had served previously on fires. Logistical and transportation delays plagued the mobilization. On the way to the planned assembly area at the mouth of Mann Gulch, Jansson suspected that the fire might be encroaching into Merriweather Canyon, a scenic area. He directed Hersey to ascend the Meriwether trail with the 19-man ground crew and attack the fire at the Mann Gulch/Meriwether ridge. The temperature at Helena, 25 miles to the south, was reaching 97 °F (36 °C), the hottest day on record to date. The fire danger rating was calculated at 74 out of 100: "explosive stage".

3:10 pm – C-47 pilot Kenneth Huber located the fire in Mann Gulch and began to circle. Spotter and jumpmaster Earl Cooley and crew foreman R. Wagner Dodge appraised the fire. They observed that since 4 August, the lightning caused blaze had scorched 50 to 60 acres, originating in Mann Gulch and spreading upslope and south to the crest at Meriwether Canyon, where it had crowned and burnt out without generating any spot fires. The fire was moving gradually downhill to the northeast (up gulch) through sparse grass. The fire appeared to be routine.

Never let a fire get below you on a mountain. Only bears and fires – not firefighters – can run uphill faster than down.

— An old firefighter rule

3:50 pm to 4:10 pm – Smokejumpers and cargo drops completed. (Figure 1) After dropping the men at the customary 1,200 feet (370 meters) elevation, Huber took the C-47 to 2,000 feet (610 meters) to drop the equipment because of heavy turbulence. As a result, the gear was widely scattered on the north slope delaying its retrieval.

Several of the sixteen smokejumpers experienced flight sickness due to the turbulence and one of them became too ill to jump. Merle "Skip" Stratton submitted his resignation from the US Forest Service when the airplane returned to Missoula that evening, before news of the tragedy was reported. He would be return to Mann Gulch to assist in the recovery operation of his deceased comrades.

Dodge was not provided with topographical maps of the area and was expected to obtain them when he encountered ground crews at the site. The single-sideband radio was smashed when its static line broke and the chute failed to deploy.

4:35 pm – Jansson proceeded by boat along the Missouri towards the mouth of Mann Creek to begin a survey of its south slope and to establish contact with the smokejumpers.

4:55 pm – Smokejumper equipment collected and assembled at cargo area. (Figure 1) The crew was about one mile as the raven flies up the drainage from the Missouri River. They could see the fire's perimeter about 0.25 miles (0.40 kilometers) to the southwest on the south slope which appeared to be burning away from the crew. The men were "not greatly impressed" with the blaze and only concerned that "the steep and rocky ground" would make mop up difficult the next morning. Smokejumper Robert Sallee later remarked, "I took a look at the fire and decided it wasn't bad. It was burning on top of the ridge and I thought it would continue on up the ridge ..."

5:00 pm – The smokejumpers heard a shout near the fire perimeter. Foreman Dodge ordered squad leader Bill Hellman to take charge while he went to investigate. He discovered Jim Harrison near the fire line.

5:02 pm – Jansson began his ascent up Mann Gulch by foot. Visibility was about 200 yards (180 meters) due to dense smoke. Winds in the lower gulch were between 20 and 30 mi/h (32 to 48 km/h), gusting to 40 mi/h (64 km/h), much higher than those occurring in Helena, 25 miles (40 kilometers) to the south.

5:10 pm – After spending about 10 minutes tooling up at the cargo area, the smokejumpers crossed the dry gulch bottom and began to climb the south slope towards the fire. Eleven of the smokejumpers were double-tooled, bearing both a Pulaski and a shovel. Two of the men carried the two-man crosscut saws and one man shouldered the 5-gallon (19-liter) jug mounted on a backpack.

5:12 pm – 5:15 pm – Dodge called to the crew to halt when they had advanced up the slope about 100 yards (91 meters) and he rejoined them immediately with Harrison. Dodge, in consultation with Harrison who has been on the fire for four hours, announced that the crew "had better get out of that thick reproduction [heavy fuels]" – dense stands of second-growth ponderosa pine and Douglas fir. The crew was downwind of the fire, a potential "death trap" according to Dodge.

Dodge directed Hellman to cross back to the north side of the gulch and march the men southwest and to "sidehill" (follow the contour) towards the Missouri River. He cautioned them to stay high enough up the north slope to keep the fire on the south slope in view. The plan was to attack the fire on its western flank (the upwind position) so as to prevent its spread into Meriwether Canyon. Dodge was not yet alarmed and returned with Harrison about 300 yards (270 meters) to the cargo assembly area to pick up some food and water while Hellman proceeded west with the smokejumpers. From the elevated position at the cargo area, Dodge could see that the fire was "boiling up" and determined he would evacuate the men from Mann Gulch.

During the past hour, the wind had shifted 180° and was now coming from the south and blowing forcefully upgulch.

== "Blowup" and Retreat ==
5:15 pm – Ranger Jansson had walked almost one-half mile (0.80 kilometers) from the mouth of Mann Gulch in the thickening smoke. (Figure 1) Spot fires were appearing around him. He was witnessing the early stages of the south slope "blowup" about 300 yards (270 meters) south of where the smokejumpers would be forced to flee up the north slope just minutes later. Jansson believed he heard metallic noises of men wielding tools and walked another 200 yards (180 meters) upslope to investigate, but the sound was probably an aural hallucination caused by the raging fire.

The fire's rapid descent from the Meriwether Canyon ridge downslope to the mouth of the gulch was likely propelled by a brief thunderstorm at the Meriwether Canyon ridge. During this "blowup" event a wind vortex produced "fire whirls", lofting burning debris over to the north slope.

5:30 pm – Jansson began to retreat down the gulch. The superheated air had created a thermal "convection vortex" that threatened to sear his lungs. He made a dash to escape but momentarily passed out. Recovering just as flames were a few yards (meters) away, he fled down gulch and reached the river at 5:41 pm. Approximately the same time Jansson was fleeing from the "blowup" near the mouth of the gulch, Dodge and his men were, unawares, marching directly towards it.

5:40 pm – Dodge and Harrison overtook the crew to find that the men had split into two groups about 500 feet (150 meters) apart. Dodge gathered the men into a single column and led them down gulch with Hellman taking the rear.

At the time [the column started descending the gulch] the fire began burning a little more fiercely. We all noticed it. A very interesting spectacle. That's about all we thought about it

— 21-year-old smokejumper Walter Ramsey

5:45 pm – Leading the column, Dodge saw that the south slope fire had jumped to the north slope of Mann Gulch directly west of them and was advancing towards them steadily, driven by the up gulch wind. The blaze was igniting heavy fuels, including conifer reproduction and creating high intensity crown fires, with multiple spotting. Btu's per foot per second were estimated to range from 400 to 1000. Wind driven flames were about 7–10 feet (2.1–3.0 meters) high and moving diagonally uphill towards the smokejumpers.

The route to the river was clearly blocked. Dodge instantly ordered his men to reverse direction and move upslope and cross-contour, climbing obliquely to the northeast. (Figure 1, Pt 1) The fire front, about 150–200 yards (140–180 meters) distance was advancing at an estimated rate of 120 feet per minute (37 m/min; 1.4 mph; 2.2 km/h).

The men proceeded up the cross-contour 18% grade through scattered stands of mature ponderosa pine. The grassy groundcover stood about 2.5 feet (0.76 meters) high (thigh to waist deep). The men were walking at a rate of 2 mph (3.2 km/h) and still carrying their firefighting equipment.

At the time the column of firefighters begin their retreat, they had about a four or five-minute head start on the fire.

Ranger Jansson soon noted that the fire was 'whirling' and spreading firebrands (i.e. burning debris) to the north of the bottom of Mann Gulch. The fire whirls ... suggest that fire had become a 'blowup'. A 'blowup' occurs when a fire rapidly transitions from a ground fire to a crown fire and creates its own convection vortex. Fuel, terrain and wind – the classic fire triangle – are the causes of these brief, but very explosive events.

— Physical Geographer Karl Lillquist, Central Washington University

The behavior of the fire was about to change under the influence of the turbulent winds, steep slope and the lighter and more volatile ground cover. When the wind, estimated at 30 miles per hour (48 km/h), pushed the fire into the grass understory, its speed accelerated to an estimated 280 feet per minute (85 m/min; 3.2 mph; 5.1 km/h). Heat intensity also increased, rising to 2500 – 4000 Btu. The leading edge of the flames were reaching 16–20 feet (4.9–6.1 meters) in height. While the fire accelerated under the influence of the increasing slope, the smokejumpers progress slowed.

5:53 pm – Dodge ordered the crew to drop tools and packs (some men had already jettisoned their equipment, others continued to cling to them). (Figure 1, Pt 2) Artifacts discovered later at the tool drop site were found within a 50-foot radius (15-meter), indicating that the column was still cohesive at this point. Testimony from survivors suggests that beyond the drop site some of the men began to break away in a race for the ridge.

The advancing wall of fire was about 100 yards (91 meters) from the column and rapidly overtaking them from the west and south. By this time, the men knew they were in a desperate situation. Unburdened, they increased their pace to about 4 mph (6.4 km/h).

The crew suddenly emerged from the sparse timber and into a mostly treeless expanse where they could clearly see the top of Mann Gulch ridge. The groundcover here was dry and highly combustible Cheat grass and Fescue, tinder dry in the near 100 °F (38 °C) heat. Leaving the timber behind, the surface winds were estimated to have increased, with gusts up to 40 mph (64 km/h).

When the fire blew into this open landscape it was travelling at a variable rate 360–610 feet per minute (110 – 187 meters per minute), or 4.1 to 6.9 mph (6.6 to 11.1 km/h). The Btu's had risen to 5,500 -9000. The flames ranged in height from 10–40 feet (3.0–12.2 meters).

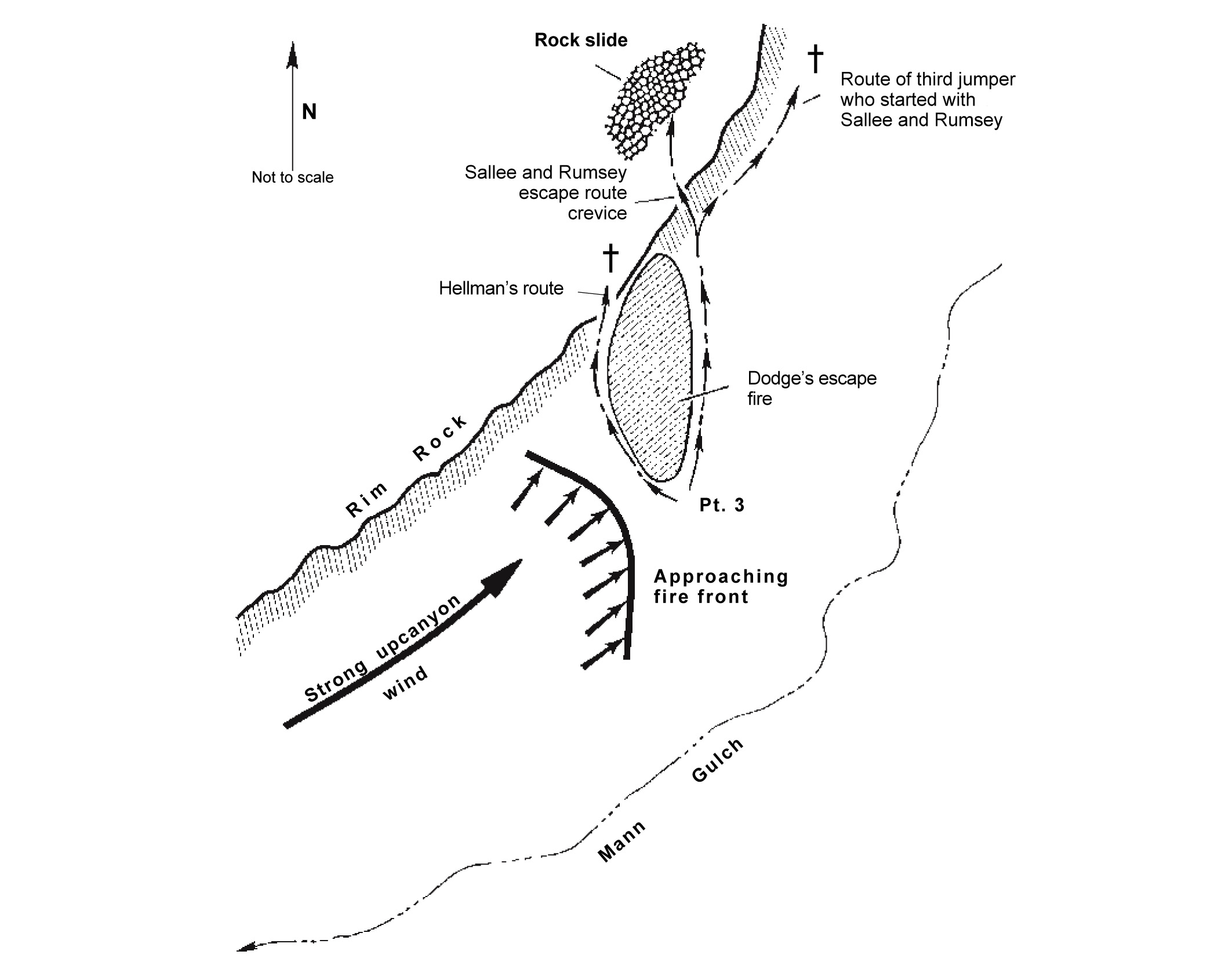
Figure 2 – Mann Gulch Fire, 1949. Dodge "escape fire" map

5:55 pm – At 220 yards (200 meters) beyond the equipment drop, Dodge walking in the lead of the column, reached a small grassy clearly at a steep grade break. (Figure 1, Pt 3) This position was 200 yards (180 meters) from the top of the ridge, measured at right angles (perpendicular) to the contour.

The fire had gained on the crew at every stage of their retreat. Despite having doubled their speed, the fire had closed to within 50 yards (46 meters) of the rear of the column.

Dodge judged that he and his men could not reach the ridge before being overtaken and engulfed by the flames. The fire was advancing at an estimated average rate of 660 ft/min (202 meters/mi) or 7.5 mi/h (12 km/h), an extremely rapid spread. The temperature of fire was estimated to measure at least 1,500 °F (820 °C).

Applying a principle of basic fire science, Dodge immediately ignited a flimsy "gofer" match and swept it across the grass. The flames quickly spread uphill, initially burning at relatively low intensity. The wind at his position was lighter due to the backdraft created by the approaching inferno. Within seconds his grass fire had grown to one hundred square feet (9.2 square meters). Dodge's intention was to create a fuel-free zone, where the crew could take refuge. He expected that the main fire would roar around the burnt over area, leaving the men unharmed. No protocol existed in the US Forest Service for this so-called "escape fire."

Four smokejumpers at the head of the column – Walter Rumsey, Robert Sallee, Eldon Diettert and squad leader Hellman – reached the foreman first and were bewildered by his actions, despite his efforts to explain his purpose. The men hesitated for a few moments, then one of them said "To hell with that, I'm getting out of here" and the men rushed straight uphill towards the ridge about 200 yards distance. Sallee, a survivor, would later declare that "No one could live who left Dodge even seconds after we did." (Figure 2)

An exchange between C. M. Granger, USFS administrator and R. Wagner Dodge, crew foreman during the Board of Review testimony, 26 September 1949:

GRANGER: After the fire ... [d]id you at that time know what had happened to the rest of the crew?
DODGE: I had a fair idea. I didn't think any of them had made the ridge.
GRANGER: You didn't think any of them made the ridge?
DODGE: I didn't think any of them were still alive.

About eight crewmen (exactly which of the crewmen is uncertain) advanced close enough to Dodge and the escape fire to see him motioning with his arms towards the burnt area and calling to them over the din of the roaring fire just yards (meters) away. There is conjecture that four of the smokejumpers may have already fled ahead or were too far back in the column to hear him. A number of the firefighters reached further up the slope to a distance of about 375 yards (345 meters) beyond the escape fire. This suggests that they may have been in advance of Dodge before be ignited his survival fire.

These eight firefighters hesitated briefly, perhaps no longer than 10 or 15 seconds before plunging onward up the canyon and angling towards the ridge. None of these men heeded Dodge.

Several of the firefighters had little more than a 15-second lead on the wall of fire as they passed the escape fire perimeter. Unable to climb faster than 400 feet/min (123 meters/min) or 4.5 mi/h (7.5 km/h), these men were overtaken by the flames in probably less than 45 seconds before they had covered more than 100 yards (91 meters) beyond the perimeter of Dodge's escape fire.

Four of the firefighters reached further up the slope to a distance of about 375 yards (345 (meters) beyond the escape fire before they were engulfed in the flames. This suggests that they may have been in advance of Dodge before be ignited his grass fire. These firefighters ran perhaps 620 (570 meters) after casting off their equipment at the drop site, jogging upslope at 460 feet/min (142 meters/min) or 5.3 mi/h (8.4 km/h), an astonishing rate to maintain on an 18% grade over rough terrain.

One smokejumper, Stanley J. Reba broke a leg in his effort to escape the flames, a measure of how steep and treacherous the footing.

== Survivors ==
Of the four firefighters who fled from Dodge to scramble the 100–140 yards (91–128 meters) straight to the ridge top, two survived: Robert Sallee and Walter Rumsey. The 17-year old Sallee mistakenly thought that Dodge's intent was to create a firebreak to slow the advance of the main fire. He, Rumsey and Diettert ascended to the right (east) of the growing escape blaze as it moved upslope. (Figure 2)

Approaching the crest, these three firefighters encountered a 6-to-12-foot (1.8-to-3.7-metre) high wall of rimrock or "reef" that blocked access to the top of the ridge. Rumsey and Salle were fortunate to notice a breach or crevice in the rimrock and ran through it to the ridge. Rumsey testified that he could feel the intense heat of the main fire on his back as they neared the top of the ridge. Diettert, just steps behind them, either did not see the crevice or chose to search elsewhere to cross over. His remains were found a one hundred yards (91 metres) eastward at the base of the reef.

The squad leader, Hellman, ascended the slope parallel to these three firefighters, but on the left (west) side of the escape fire. He was forced to run a gauntlet of flames as he reached the rimrock barrier, but managed to pass over the ridge into Rescue Gulch.

Moments before the main fire reached Dodge, he threw himself face down on the smoldering ashes of the escape fire. His mouth and nose were covered with a wet bandanna. The slope he had burned was ample enough in area so as to shield him from injury from heat radiation or from direct contact with the flames of the main fire. He was almost lifted from his prone position several times by powerful gusts of superheated air during the few minutes it took the inferno to pass.

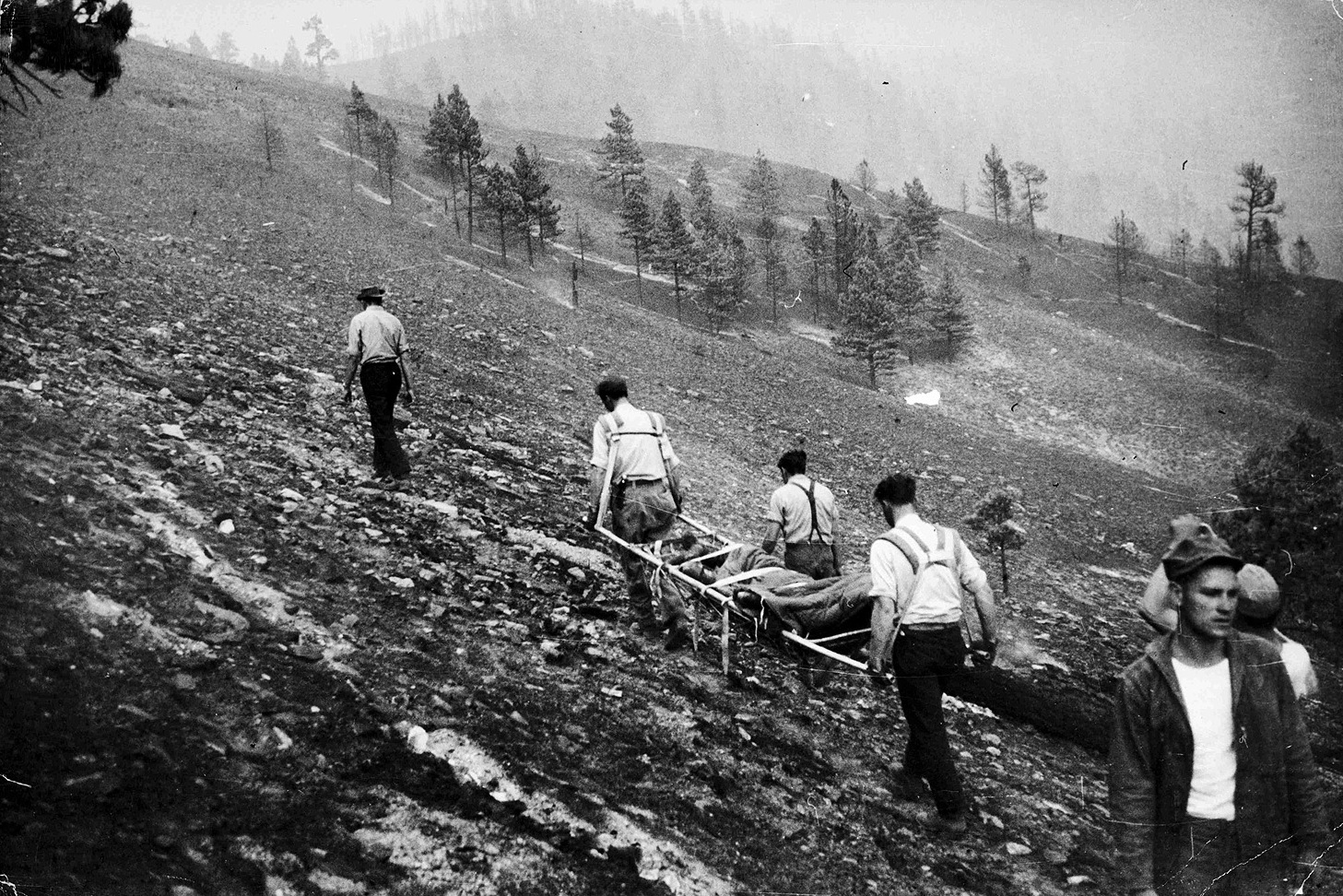
Mann Gulch Fire, 1949. US Forest Service. Retrieval of victim's bodies by fellow smokejumpers, August 6, 1949

Sallee and Rumsey fled into Rescue Gulch. Rumsey momentarily collapsed from exhaustion but with Sallee's urging they reached a downslope blockfield largely free of vegetation that afforded them some protection as the main fire continued over the ridge to burn downslope past them.

6:10 pm – Dodge rose from the smoldering escape fire, his face and clothing blackened by the smoke, but otherwise virtually unscathed. All twelve of the crewmen who failed to reach the ridge perished in the inferno. Had they been able to grasp what their foreman was doing, or obeyed his commands, they probably would have survived.

Dodge found the badly injured Joseph B. Sylvia just 100 yards (91 meters) to the east of the escape fire. He made Sylvia as comfortable as he could and provided him with water. Dodge departed to seek medical assistance for him.

Sallee and Rumsey discovered the badly burned Hellman just 90 feet (27 meters) west of their position and helped him to the blockfield. Dodge joined them shortly thereafter, and he and Salle descended Rescue Gulch to the Missouri River. Rumsey remained with Hellman.

8:50 pm – Dodge and Sallee reached the Meriwether Guard Station after flagging down a boat and radioed for assistance.

11:30 pm – Two medical doctors from St. Peters Hospital in Helena were escorted up Rescue Gulch by Dodge and Sallee. Sylvia and Hellman were administered plasma and morphine and their wounds dressed.

6 August 1949

Daylight – The two injured smokejumpers were carried by stretcher to the mouth of Mann Gulch and transported by boat to St. Peters Hospital in Helena. Both Sylvia and Hellman had suffered third degree burns over 65% to 85% of their bodies, as well as severe damage to their respiratory systems. They both died later that morning.

The eleven other smokejumpers – Robert Bennett, Eldon Diettert, Phillip McVey, David Navon, Leonard Piper, Stanley Reba, Marvin Sherman, Henry Thol Jr., Newton Thompson, and Silas Thompson, as well as recreation guard James Harrison are believed to have succumbed quickly from asphyxiation and burns they suffered shortly after 6:00 pm on 5 August.

== Findings ==
=== Casualties ===
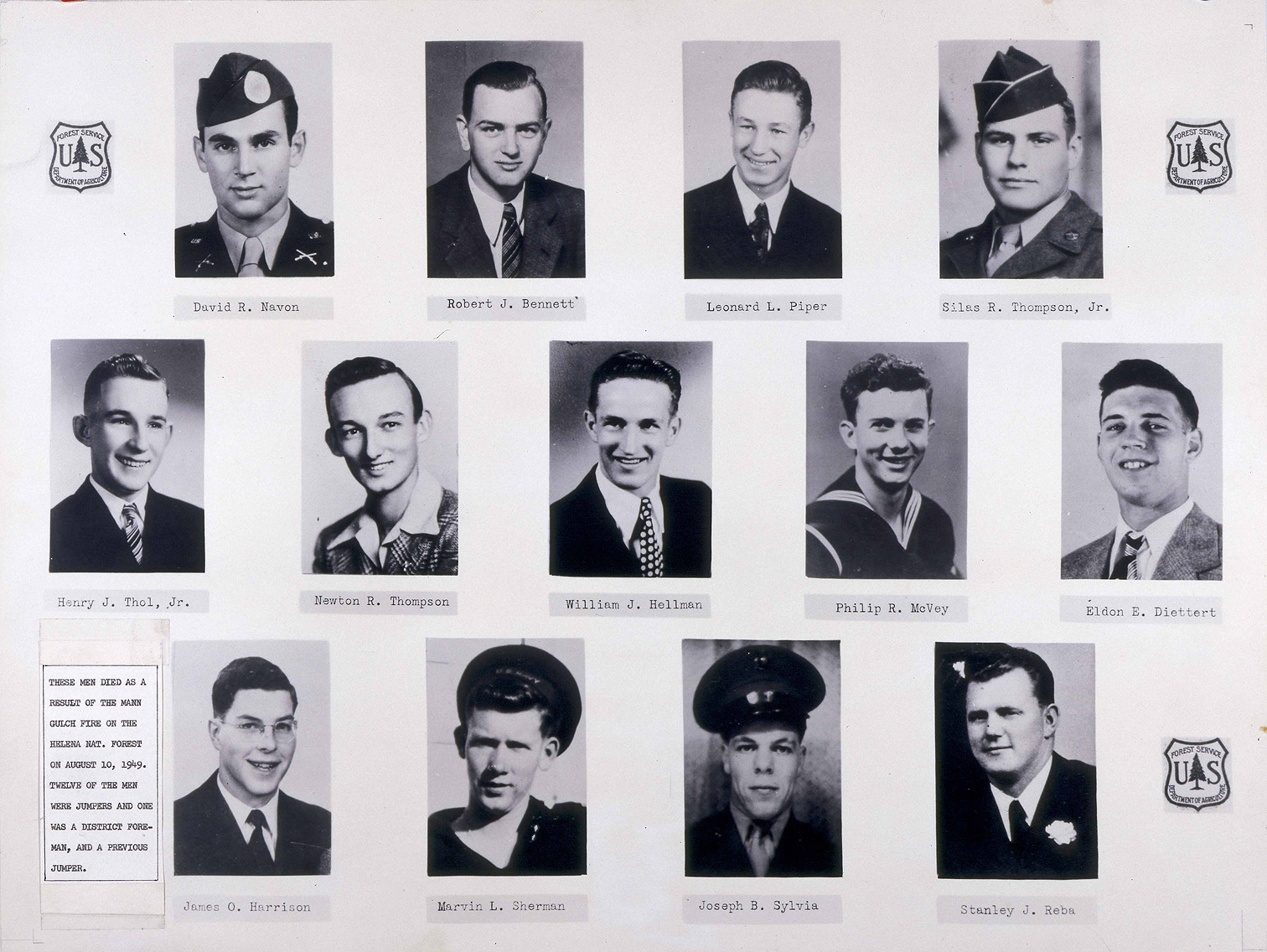
Mann Gulch Fire, 1949 US Forest Service Smokejumpers – Memorial photos, 13 victims

Those that were killed by the fire:

- Robert J. Bennett, age 22, from Paris, Tennessee
- Eldon E. Diettert, age 19, from Missoula, Montana, died on his 19th birthday
- James O. Harrison, Helena National Forest Fire Guard, age 20, from Missoula, Montana
- William J. Hellman, age 24, from Kalispell, Montana
- Philip R. McVey, age 22, from Babb, Montana
- David R. Navon, age 28, from Modesto, California
- Leonard L. Piper, age 23, from Blairsville, Pennsylvania
- Stanley J. Reba, from Brooklyn, New York
- Marvin L. Sherman, age 21, from Missoula, Montana
- Joseph B. Sylvia, age 24, from Plymouth, Massachusetts
- Henry J. Thol Jr., age 19, from Kalispell, Montana
- Newton R. Thompson, age 23, from Alhambra, California
- Silas R. Thompson, age 21, from Charlotte, North Carolina

Those that survived:

- R. Wagner "Wag" Dodge, Missoula SJ foreman, age 33 at the time of the fire. Dodge died 5 years after the fire from Hodgkin's disease.
- Walter B. Rumsey, age 21 at time of the fire, from Larned, Kansas. Rumsey died in an airplane crash in 1980, age 52.
- Robert W. Sallee, youngest man on the crew, age 17 at time of the fire, from Willow Creek, Montana. Last survivor of the smoke jumpers. Died May 29, 2014.

== Sources ==
- Lillquist, Karl. 2006. Teaching with Catastrophe: Topographic Map Interpretation and the Physical Geography of the 1949 Mann Gulch, Montana Wildfire Journal of Geoscience Education, 54:5, 561–571, DOI: 10.5408/1089-9995-54.5.561 http://www.nagt.org/files/nagt/jge/abstracts/lillquist-v54p561.pdf Retrieved 28 August 2018.
- Maclean, Norman 1992 (reissued 2017) Young Men and Fire. University Of Chicago Press. ISBN 978-0-226-45035-3
- Rothermel, Robert C. 1993. Mann Gulch Fire: A Race That Couldn't Be Won. United States Department of Agriculture Forest Service Intermountain Research Station. General Technical Report INT-299. May 1993 https://www.fs.fed.us/rm/pubs_int/int_gtr299.pdf Retrieved 28 August 2018.
- US Forest Service. Mann Gulch. Department of Agriculture. https://www.fs.fed.us/science-technology/fire/people-working-fire/smokejumpers/smokejumper-base-contact-information/missoula-smokejumpers/history/gulch Retrieved 28 August 2018.
