= National Smokejumper Association =

American non-profit organization

- Formation: September 1992
- Type: 501(c)(3)
- Tax ID no.: 81-0479209
- Location: Missoula, Montana, United States
- Members: 1,720
- President: Robert A. McKean
- 1st Vice President: Charles N. Sheley
- Website: smokejumpers.com

The National Smokejumper Association (NSA) is a non-profit (501(c)(3)), American organization based in Missoula, Montana, that preserves the history of aerial fire management, or smokejumping, through interviews, rosters, photographs, films, letters, reports and publications. It is also a meeting area for people involved with wildland firefighting and helps in the preservation of national forests and grasslands. The first president of the NSA was Earl Cooley, one of the first smokejumpers for the United States Forest Service. Cooley presided over the NSA from 1993 to 1995. Other past presidents of the NSA were Laird Robinson, Ed Courtney, Carl Gidlund, Larry Lufkin, Ron Stoleson and Doug Houston. The current president is Robert A. McKean.

== History of smokejumping ==
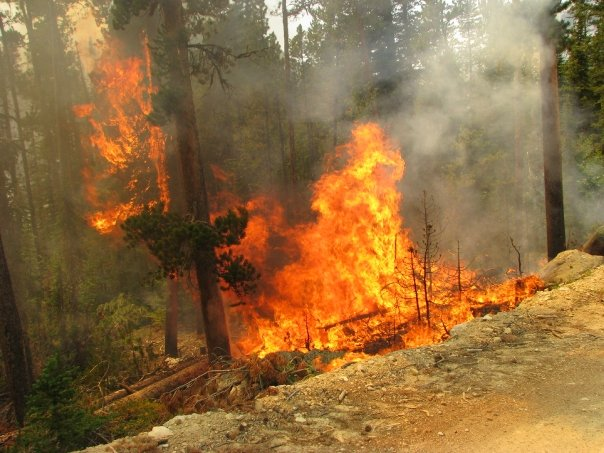
A fire scorches trees and vegetation at Custer National Forest in August 2008

Aerial Fire Patrols: The idea and implementation of smokejumping was a gradual process, starting with aerial fire patrols. In 1918, Henry S. Graves, the Chief Forester for the United States Forest Service, contacted the Chief of the Army Air Service to have aerial patrols over the western states to look for forest fires. This request was transferred to Col. Henry "Hap" Arnold, head of the Western Department of the Air Service. Arnold loaned aircraft to the Forest Service to create aerial patrols, and by 1925, there were aerial patrols in western Montana, Idaho and eastern Washington. Two Airco DH.4 aircraft, based in Spokane, Wash., flew on these patrols, piloted by Nick Mamer and R.T. Freng.

The Winthrop Experiments: In 1939, David P. Godwin, Assistant Chief of Fire Control in Washington, D.C., recommended that the Aerial Experimental Project in Northern Pacific Region try some parachute jumping experiments. The Forest Service made a contract to prepare for the jumps, providing parachutes, protective clothing and assistance from professional riggers and parachutists. The experiments were conducted in the Chelan National Forest, near Winthrop, Wash. During the experimental course, two Winthrop citizens under contract, five Forest Service personnel and 60 Eagle Parachute Company personnel parachuted from aircraft into Chelan National Forest at heights between 2,000 and 6,000 feet. No one was seriously injured during these experiments.

Training and Implementation: Smokejumper training was focused in the Forest Service's Region 1 (Montana, Idaho and eastern Washington) and Region 6 (North Pacific Region). Region 1 selected six applicants who had firefighting experience, including Earl Cooley. Region 6 selected individuals who had jumped during the 1939 Winthrop experiments. The first jump for Region 1 was at Marten Creek in the Nez Perce National Forest on July 12, 1940. The first jump for Region 6 was at Bridge Creek in the Chelan National Forest on August 10 of that year. Some injuries occurred during the training sessions and aerial firefighting jumps, including bruising and a tailbone injury. Region 6 smokejumper Dick Tuttle was unable to participate in the 1940 fire season because of injuries sustained after falling from a tree.

During the first smokejumper rescue mission on July 15, 1940, smokejumper Chet Derry parachuted into an area south of Moose Creek Ranger Station in Idaho. A cargo plane had clipped a tree and cartwheeled into a shallow lake, killing the pilot and seriously injuring the cargo kicker.

== Smokejumper history program ==
The smokejumper history program is a collection that includes more than 250 video interviews with early smokejumpers, thousands of scanned and original photographs, and thousands of historical documents pertaining to smokejumping. This collection is preserved at the University of Montana's Maureen and Mike Mansfield Library. The NSA has a database of all known smokejumpers and created the first list of smokejumpers killed in action. The NSA is looking into options for cataloguing, storing and displaying historical artifacts.

== Mission Statement and values ==
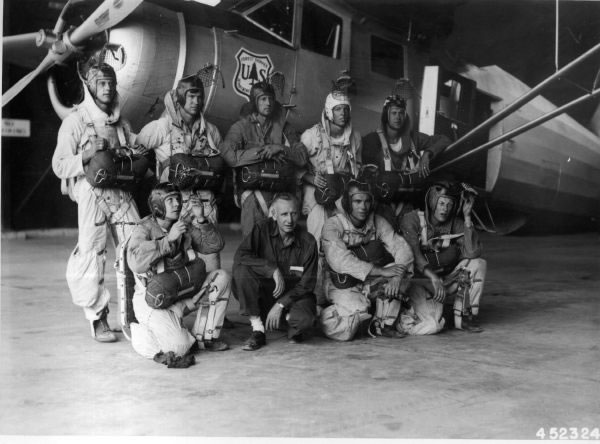
US Forest Service smokejumpers, based in Deming, New Mexico, 1948

The official Mission Statement and values of the NSA as of July 1, 2009:

"The National Smokejumper Association, through a cadre of volunteers and partnerships, is dedicated to preserving the history and lore of smoke jumping (sic), maintaining and restoring our nation's forest and grassland resources, responding to special needs of smokejumpers and their families and advocating for the programs (sic) evolution."

"The values of the NSA are comradeship, education, pride in work well done and loyalty."

== Trails Program ==
The National Smokejumper Association's Trails Program was founded in 1999 by former treasurer Jon McBride and former smokejumper Art Jukkala to field volunteer crews to clear trails, fix historical structures and build corrals and fences. McBride and Jukkala formed this group to help the Forest Service with trail maintenance, because it had cut back on it due to budget constraints. When Jukkala died of a heart attack during the program's first project that year, McBride became sole director of the Trails Program. Under McBride's leadership, the program expanded from two nine-man crews to 318 one-week crews by the time of his death on June 2, 2010. In 2010, 197 Trails Program volunteers completed 24 projects in six states. Areas with trails opened and maintained by this group included the Boundary Waters, High Sierra, Iditarod Trail and Bob Marshall Wilderness. The Trails Program hopes to add West Virginia to their list of project states by 2011.

== Scholarships ==
The NSA supports three scholarship programs. The first is the Art Jukkala Scholarship Program, which was named after a former smokejumper who died of a heart attack during a Trails Program project. This program awards scholarships to the children of smokejumpers who were killed in action. Four scholarships have been awarded, totaling $10,000.

A second program is the NSA Trail Maintenance Smokejumper Chair Scholarship Fund, which provides a yearly scholarship to a smokejumper or child of a smokejumper who is studying forestry at the University of Montana.

An NSA Scholarship program is going to start in 2011. This program will give $2,000 annually to smokejumpers or family members pursuing higher education at the trade school or college level.

== Good Samaritan Fund ==
The Good Samaritan Fund was created to financially aid smokejumpers, smokejumper pilots and their families. The NSA has donated over $6,000 since the fund's inception.

== Presidents of the NSA ==
1. Earl Cooley (1993–1995): Earl Cooley was one of the first two men in history to parachute from an airplane to fight a fire, which was at the Nez Perce National Forest on July 12, 1940. He trained smokejumpers in Montana during the 1940s, many of whom were conscientious objectors of World War II.
On August 5, 1949, Cooley picked the spots for smokejumpers to land during the Mann Gulch fire. A wind shift resulted in 13 deaths, including 12 smokejumpers, the most smokejumper fatalities during one job. An investigation cleared Cooley and a foreman who had helped him pick the landing spots of misfeasance.
Cooley said he was never afraid of jumping out of a plane and the only thing he did not enjoy about smokejumping was the walk home. By the time he died on November 9, 2009, Cooley had jumped almost 50 times.

2. Ed Courtney (1995–1997): Ed Courtney was a smokejumper based in Missoula, Montana, in 1958. Courtney became the principal of Missoula's Lowell School from 1991–1993 and taught seventh and eighth grade at Russell School. In 1993, Courtney went to work at the Missoula Public Schools Administration Building, where he stayed until his retirement.

3. Laird Robinson (1997–1999): Laird Robinson was a smokejumper in Montana for the Forest Service for over 10 years. He began his smokejumping career at the Flathead National Forest from 1961 to 1967, then for the U.S. Air Force from 1967 to 1971. After smokejumping, Robinson became the regional office public outreach coordinator for the Interagency Grizzly Bear Recovery Program, which was a collaboration between multiple government agencies to ensure the recovery of grizzly bear populations in areas such as the Bitterroot Ecosystem, Bob Marshall Wilderness and Yellowstone National Park. Robinson retired May 2, 2004, after 35 years with the Forest Service.
Robinson helped University of Chicago professor Norman Maclean find sources for Young Men and Fire, Maclean's 1992 book on the Mann Gulch fire.

4. Carl Gidlund (1999–2001): Carl Gidlund obtained his master's degree in journalism from the University of Montana in 1967 and then joined the Forest Service, where he became a smokejumper for five years. He also served in the Special Forces during the Vietnam War. After smokejumping, Gidlund became a public affairs officer for the Idaho Panhandle National Forests. Gidlund retired to Hayden Lake, Idaho, in 2001, where he writes columns in the Spokesman-Review, and writes and edits for Smokejumper Magazine.

During Gidlund's tenure as NSA president in 1999, he said he was convinced by former treasurer Jon McBride and former smokejumper Art Jukkala to help create the Trails Program.

5. Larry Lufkin (2001–2003): Larry Lufkin was a smokejumper at Siskiyou Smokejumper Base, Oregon, during 1963–1967 and 1969–1971. During the break in his smokejumping career, Lufkin joined the Army and served in the 101st Airborne Division in the Vietnam War. After he earned a degree in accounting from Washington State University in 1971, Lufkin worked as a field auditor for the Office of Inspector General at the Department of Health and Human Services. In 1981, Lufkin transferred to the Office of Child Support Enforcement, where he worked as the Area Audit Office Supervisor until his retirement in 2000.
Lufkin's father, Francis Lufkin, was one of the first people to jump from a plane during the Aerial Experimental Project in 1939. He was also one of the first two people to jump into Region 6 (North Pacific Region), to fight a fire at Chelan National Forest.

6. Roland "Ron" Stoleson (2003–2005): Ron Stoleson was a smokejumper based in Missoula, starting in 1956. Stoleson was Forest Supervisor of the Sawtooth National Forest from 1982to 1991. He retired in 2000, after 42 years in the Forest Service. After his retirement, Stoleson led crews for the Trails Program to help maintain trails and other natural and historical resources.
Stoleson is the only living survivor of a 1959 accident, in which a Ford Tri-Motor plane crashed into gasoline barrels while landing at the Moose Creek airstrip. He was in the plane at the time. The crash killed 10 people, including two smokejumpers and the Nez Perce Forest supervisor. Stoleson escaped from the plane, but was burned on the face and arms during the incident.

7. Doug Houston (2005–2009): Doug Houston was a smokejumper for 28 years. The first 17 years, he was stationed in Redmond, Oregon. The next 11 were spent as the smokejumper base manager for the North Cascades Smokejumper base in Winthrop, Wash. Houston is currently an instructor for Mission-Centered Solutions in Parker, Colorado.

8. John Twiss (2009–present): John Twiss began working as a seasonal employee for the National Park Service at Yellowstone National Park in 1965. After working as a seasonal, Twiss became a Forest Service smokejumper for nine years, based out of Redmond, Oregon, from 1967 to 1976. When he was done with smokejumping, Twiss worked as a District Ranger in Idaho and Oregon; Deputy Forest Supervisor in Minnesota; National Wilderness Leader in Washington, D.C.; and the Forest Supervisor of the Black Hills National Forest. In July 2005, Twiss became director of law enforcement and investigations for the Forest Service. He retired November 2008, after a 40-year career with the Forest Service.

== Election process ==
Elections for the NSA Board of Directors are held annually. Usually, there is only one candidate up for each position, so they are elected by vote of the directors. The NSA has two classes of voting members—smokejumpers and smokejumper pilots. Associate members do not vote in the elections.
