= Earl Cooley =

Earl Cooley may refer to:

- Earl Cooley (politician) (1880–1940), Colorado Lieutenant Governor
- Earl Cooley (smokejumper) (1911–2009), one of the U.S. Forest Service's first smokejumpers
