= Smokejumper =

Skydiving wildland firefighters

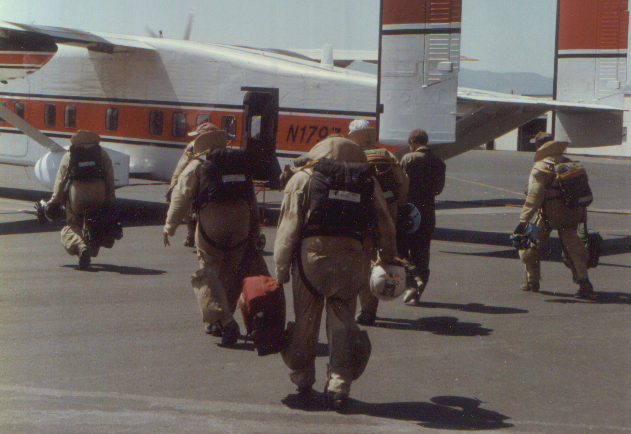
Fully outfitted smokejumpers boarding a Short C-23 Sherpa aircraft in Missoula, Montana, en route to a fire in the Idaho panhandle, July 1994

A smokejumper is a specially trained wildland firefighter who provides an initial attack response on remote wildfires. They are inserted at the site of the fire by parachute. This allows firefighters to access remote fires in their early stages without needing to hike long distances carrying equipment and supplies. Traditional terrestrial crews can use only what they can carry and often require hours and days to reach fire on foot. The benefits of smokejumping include the speed at which firefighters can reach a burn site, the broad range of fires a single crew can reach by aircraft, and the larger equipment payloads that can be delivered to a fire compared to pedestrian crews.

Once arrived on site, smokejumpers use similar strategies to hotshot crews and terrestrial crews to extinguish fires. Primarily, firefighters use axes to dig trenches around the fire's perimeter to isolate the flames from further fuel sources - nearby trees and shrubs. By tilling the newly exposed soil, the firefighters limit available material for the fire and it slowly burns itself out. If necessary, crews will supervise the fire overnight, and churn the ash in the morning to effectively put out any remaining embers. Once the fires are deemed thoroughly extinguished, smokejumpers retrieve the equipment and hike to the nearest clearing to be collected by helicopter.

As of 2025, there are only five countries that currently house smokejumpers: Russia, China, Canada, United States and Malaysia. These countries often coordinate exchange programs in which smokejumpers travel to aid in intense wildfire seasons.

In addition to performing the initial attack on wildfires, they may also provide leadership for extended attacks on wildland fires. Shortly after smokejumpers touch ground, they are supplied by parachute with food, water, and firefighting tools, making them self-sufficient for 48 hours. Smokejumpers are usually on duty from early spring through late fall.

== History ==
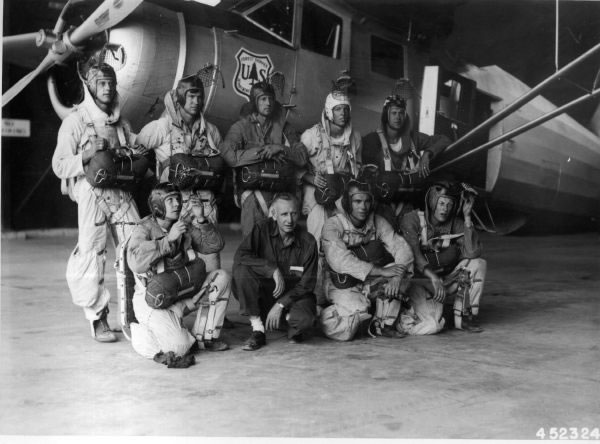
US Forest Service smokejumpers, based in Deming, New Mexico, 1948

Prior to the full establishment of smokejumping, experiments with parachute insertion of firefighters were conducted in 1934 in Utah and in the Soviet Union. Earlier, aerial firefighting experiments had been conducted with air delivery of equipment and water bombs. Although this first experiment was not pursued, another began in 1939 in the Methow Valley, Washington, where professional parachutists jumped into a variety of timbered and mountainous terrains, proving the feasibility of the idea.

Smokejumping was first proposed in 1934 in the Intermountain Region (Region 4), by Regional Forester T.V. Pearson. By 1939, the program began as an experiment in the Pacific Northwest Region (Region 6). The first official non-fire jump was made in the Nez Perce National Forest in the Northern Region (Region 1) in 1940 by John Furgurson and Lester Gohler. The McCall smokejumper program was established in 1943; their base is on the Idaho shores of Payette Lake. The base is near six national forests: Nez Perce / Clearwater, Sawtooth, the Boise, Payette, Salmon–Challis, and Wallowa-Whitman.

In 1942, permanent jump operations were established at Winthrop, Washington, and Ninemile Camp, an abandoned Civilian Conservation Corps camp (Camp Menard) a mile north of the Forest Service's Ninemile Remount Depot (pack mule) at Huson, Montana, about 30 mi (48 km) northwest of Missoula. The first fire jumps were made by Rufus Robinson and Earl Cooley at Rock Pillar near Marten Creek in the Nez Perce National Forest on July 12, 1940, out of Ninemile, followed shortly by a two-man fire jump out of Winthrop. In subsequent years, the Ninemile Camp operation moved to Missoula, where it became the Missoula Smokejumper Base. The Winthrop operation remained at its original location, as North Cascades Smokejumper Base. The "birthplace" of smokejumping continues to be debated between these two bases, the argument having persisted for about 70 years.

The first smokejumper training camp was at the Seeley Lake Ranger Station, over 60 mi (97 km) northeast of Missoula. The camp relocated to Camp Menard in July 1943. Here, when not fighting fires, the men spent much time putting up hay to feed the hundreds of pack mules that carried supplies and equipment to guard stations and fire locations. To work fires, the men, organized into squads of eight to fifteen, were stationed at six strategic points, also known as "spike camps": Seeley Lake, Big Prairie, and Ninemile in Montana; Moose Creek and McCall in Idaho; and Redwood Ranger Station in southwestern Oregon at the edge of Cave Junction. The men worked from other spike camps as well, including some in Washington.

=== Relations with the military ===
After observing smokejumper training methods at Seeley Lake in June 1940, then-Major William C. Lee of the United States Army went on to become a major general and establish the 101st Airborne Division.

In 1940, Army Dr. (Captain) Leo P. Martin was trained by the U.S. Forest Service Smokejumper Parachute Training Center in Seeley Lake, Montana as the first 'para-doctor' (predecessor to USAF Pararescue).

In May 1978, members of the Army National Guard's 19th Special Forces Group (Airborne) and other western military units briefly began airborne training at the Missoula Smokejumper School. Although in years past, the army had conducted basic airborne training at various locations, it has since been consolidated at Fort Benning, Georgia.

=== WWII-era ===
The 555th Parachute Infantry Battalion gained fame as the only entirely black airborne unit in United States Army history. The 555th was allegedly not sent to combat because of segregation in the military during World War II. In May 1945, the unit was sent to the West Coast of the United States to combat forest fires ignited by incendiary balloons sent by the Japanese Empire, an operation named "Operation Firefly". Although this threat did not fully materialize, the 555th fought numerous other forest fires while there. Stationed at Pendleton Field, Oregon, with a detachment in Chico, California, 300 unit members participated in firefighting missions throughout the Pacific Northwest during the summer and fall of 1945, earning the nickname "Smoke Jumpers". The 555th made a total of 1,200 jumps to 36 fires, 19 from Pendleton and 17 from Chico. Only one member, PFC Malvin L. Brown, was killed on August 6, 1945, after falling during a let-down from a tree in the Umpqua National Forest near Roseburg, Oregon. His death is the first recorded smokejumper fatality during a fire jump.

Around 240 workers from Civilian Public Service (CPS) camps worked as smokejumpers during World War II. An initial group of 15 men began training in parachute rigging in May 1943 at Seeley Lake, and a total of 33 completed jump training in the middle of June, followed by two weeks of training in fire ground control and first aid. About 500 training jumps were made by the first 70 CPS smokejumpers in 1943, who went on to fight 31 fires that first season. Their number increased to 110 in 1944, and to 220 in 1945, as more equipment became available from the War Department. Twenty-nine jumpers battled the remote Bell Lake fire in September 1944, among 70 fires suppressed that year, and 179 were fought in the Missoula Region alone by September 1945, with other jumpers assigned to McCall and Cave Junction. The last CPS smokejumper left the service in January 1946.

The Smokejumper Project had become a permanent establishment of the USFS in 1944. In 1946, the Missoula Region had 164 smokejumpers, many of them recent military veterans, college students, or recent college graduates. New bases were opened in Grangeville, Idaho, and West Yellowstone, Montana.

Most smokejumpers of the era were not career professionals, but seasonal employees lured by the prospect of earning as much as $1,000 over a summer. They tended to be well-behaved, self-motivated, and responsible. Squad-sized and larger crews were supervised by foremen who were career wildland firefighters and experts in all types of wildfires.

=== Mann Gulch fire ===
The fire with the greatest toll of smokejumper deaths was the Mann Gulch fire in 1949, which occurred north of Helena, Montana, at the Gates of the Mountains area along the Missouri River. Thirteen firefighters died during the blowup, twelve of them smokejumpers. This disaster directly led to the establishment of modern safety standards used by all wildland firefighters. Author Norman Maclean described the incident in his book Young Men and Fire (1992).

== Smokejumper crews worldwide ==
Smokejumpers are employed by the Russian Federation, United States (namely the United States Forest Service and Bureau of Land Management), Canada (in British Columbia). and Malaysia.

=== Russia ===
In Russia, smokejumpers are firefighters who parachute or rappel, or both, into fires. They work for the Aerial Forest Protection Service, or Avialesookhrana. This agency represents the largest cohort of smokejumpers worldwide, employing up to 4,000 individuals who protect 2,000,000,000 acres (810,000,000 ha) of land across 11 different time zones. This makes the Avialsookhrana the primary defences for half of Russia's wildland. Smokejumpers are located at 340 Avialsookhrana bases and dispatched in groups of differing sizes according to the situation at hand. Rappelling crews consist of a maximum of 20 firefighters, while parachuting teams are usually made up of five or six.

=== Canada ===
In Canada, smokejumpers are employed by the BC Wildfire Service. Here, there are three classes of initial response firefighters; initial attack crews, rapattack crews (refers to firefighters who rappel from aircraft into wildfires), and parattack crews (smokejumpers). The BC Wildfire Service houses roughly 60 smokejumpers yearly and operates the only smokejumper crews in Canada. There are two crews located in the northeast of the province.

- North Peace Smokejumpers in Fort St. John, British Columbia
- Omenica Smokejumpers in Mackenzie, British Columbia

=== United States ===
The U.S. Forest Service (USFS) and Bureau of Land Management (BLM) house 320 smokejumpers yearly, across nine bases in the western third of the country, in Idaho (3), Montana (2), California, Oregon, Washington, and Alaska. In 2020, across all the bases, 1,130 jumps were executed, with a total of 5211 days spent on initial attack. As of August 2021, nine smokejumper crews operate in the United States; seven by the USFS and two by the BLM.

Operated by the U.S. Forest Service:

- Northwest – Redmond Smokejumpers in Redmond, Oregon; North Cascades Smokejumpers in Winthrop, Washington
- Northern California – Region 5 Smokejumpers in Redding, California
- Northern Rockies – Missoula Smokejumpers in Missoula, Montana; Grangeville Smokejumpers in Grangeville, Idaho; West Yellowstone Smokejumpers in West Yellowstone, Montana
- Great Basin – McCall Smokejumpers in McCall, Idaho

Operated by the Bureau of Land Management:

- Great Basin – Boise Smokejumpers in Boise, Idaho
- Alaska – Alaska Smokejumpers in Fort Wainwright, Alaska

=== Malaysia ===
Pasukan Khas Udara Bomba (PASKUB) (English: Bomba Special Air Services) is a command for elite smokejumpers supported by helicopters from JBPM Air Wing.

Smoke Jumpers Unit (Malay: Unit Payung Terjun Bomba) is an elite unit of JBPM trained in parachute insertion (static line and freefall), helicopter-borne operation and jungle survival. The formation of elite Smoke Jumpers began in 2000 after JBPM sent five firefighters to enter the Basic Static Line Parachuting Course held at Royal Malaysian Air Force (RMAF) Sempang Air Force Base, Sungai Besi as the pioneer team Smoke Jumpers. The course was conducted by RMAF Special Operations Force PASKAU until 2007, when JBPM established their own Static Ramp Air Course. Among the tasks of Smoke Jumpers are:

- Combat Air Rescue Medic
- Medical Evacuation (Medevac)
- Deep jungle/Isolated Area Firefighting Operations

Smoke Jumpers have good relations with Malaysian Armed Force Special Operations Forces as they often train with RMAF PASKAU, Malaysian Army Grup Gerak Khas from PULPAK and Royal Malaysian Police VAT 69 Commando. PASKUB members are selected from various units including STORM, MUST and EMRS.

=== China ===
Due to the logistics issues of boots-on-the-ground firefighting, in 1960 the Forest Protection Police (a predecessor of the People's Armed Police Forestry Corps, which was disbanded in 2018) received 122 paratroopers and founded the Forest Police Smokejumper Company (Chinese: 森警空降扑火中队) for rapid deployment against wildfires. On 27 May 1965 the Company saw its first action, deploying 10 Smokejumpers to assist with fighting a wildfire in Daxing'anling Prefecture. In 1978, the Smokejumper Company was renamed to the Airborne Detachment (Chinese: 森警机降支队). Between its establishment and 1981, the Airborne Detachment was deployed to fight a total of over 325 wildfires, however its fate past 1981 is currently unknown.

The Forest Police Smokejumper Company in 1962 with their Li-2; from The Paper
- https://thepaper-prod-oldimagefromnfs.oss-cn-shanghai.aliyuncs.com/image/7/42/82.jpg

== Equipment and gear ==
=== Aircraft ===
Smokejumping crews prefer the use of fixed wing aircraft rather than helicopters as they typically carry more passengers and larger payloads. At the Fort St. John base in British Columbia, Canada, modified DC-3 planes are used to carry thirteen jumpers and two spotters.

CASA C-212 Aviocar airplanes are common for American crews as they possess rear ramps that are retractable. However, in 2020 the main aircraft used by the USFS smokejumpers were SD3-60, B model, Sherpas. These represented seven of the nine agency owned aircraft that season.

The Lisunov Li-2 was used by the Chinese Forest Police Smokejumper Company.

Recently the United States have made advancements in paracargo technology that allows for supplies to be dropped with a high level of accuracy through low visibility settings such as night time and heavy smoke. This global positioning system (GPS) technology is called Joint Precision Air Drop System (JPADS).

=== Firefighting gear ===
A single crew of five to six smokejumpers in Canada will carry 6,000 ft (1,800 m) of hose, four heavy water pumps, four chainsaws, hand tools (Pulaski axes) and enough water for all crew members for 48 hours. These are all dropped with bound in a separate parachute drop. Additionally, tree climbing gear must be included in equipment drops as it is possible for jumpers to become tangled in trees upon descent.

=== Personal Protective Equipment (PPE) ===
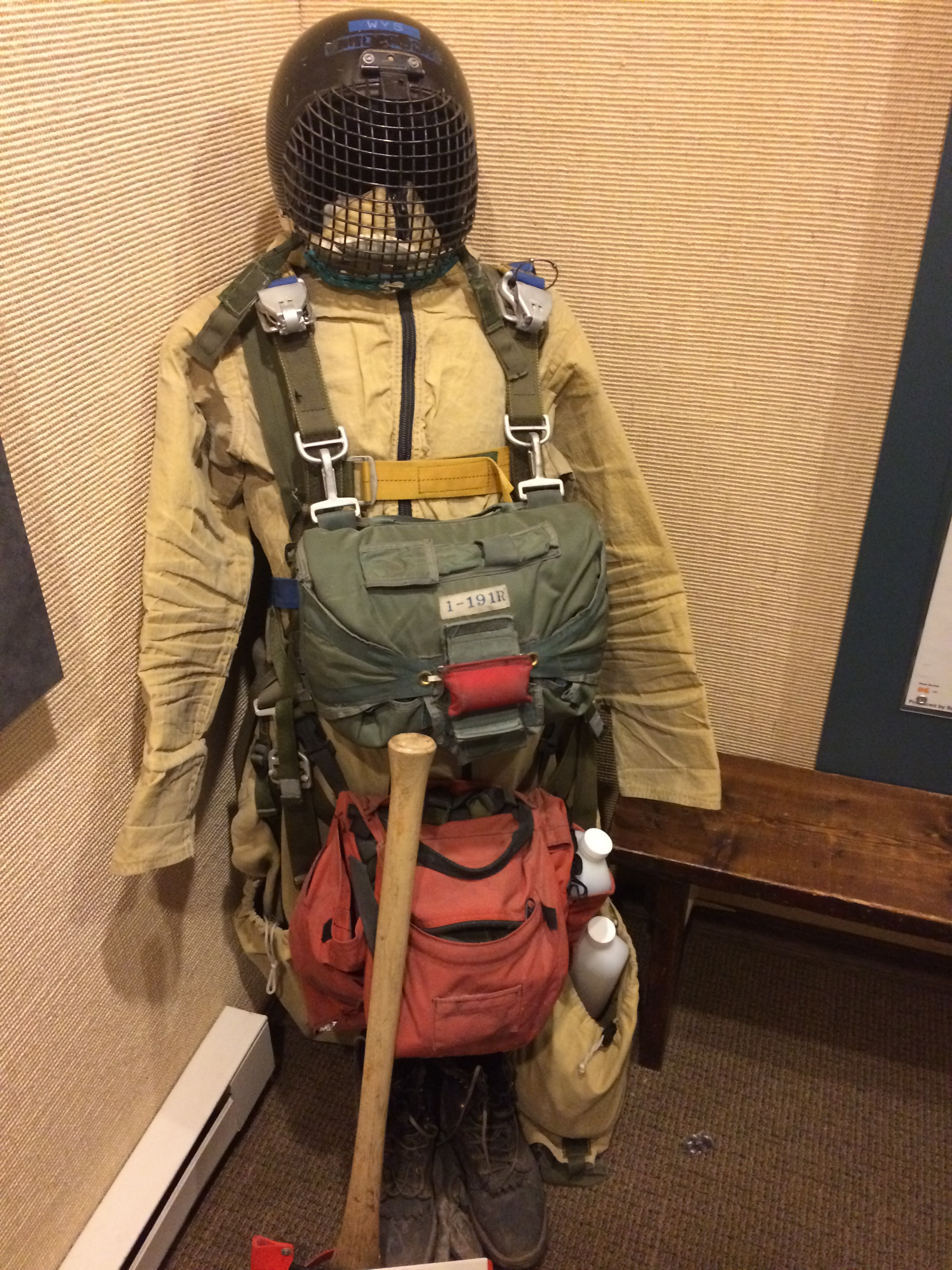
Smokejumper equipment on display, West Yellowstone, Montana.

The main body of a Canadian smokejumpers PPE is a Kevlar suit to protect against the intense heat of fires, as well as sharp objects that may pierce the skin. Helmets are adorned with mesh face shields to maintain visibility while protecting the smokejumpers from branches and embers. Gear is designed to allow jumpers to free themselves if they become tangled in trees, and is designed to help firefighters to float should they land in a body of water. These standard design features for Canadian parattack crews run a cost of roughly $12,000 per crew member. However, there is the opportunity for jumpers to edit, alter, and ultimately add to their collection of gear. Many Canadian jumpers are known to use motocross gear or hockey pads in order to help soften the blows associated with landing a parachute in deeply forested territory.

American jumpsuits are fashioned using a blend of Kevlar and Nomex and serve similar functions to Canadian suits. These suits are crafted by the smokejumpers themselves using sewing supplies housed at each base. With only 400 suits needed yearly, it is not feasible to have them manufactured offshore or en masse. Just as with Canadian jumpers, Americans use hockey gear, motocross pads, and ski helmets to round out their kit. Each jumper dons roughly 85 lb (39 kg) of gear for a single jump.

=== Survival gear ===
A significant portion of initial attack jumps take multiple days to control. On account of this, the payload deposited by aircraft include non-perishable food such as dried fruit, canned soup and beef jerky. Crews are equipped with shelters for sleep and sleeping bags.

== Safety record ==
Despite the seemingly dangerous nature of the job, fatalities from jumping are infrequent, the best-known fatalities in the United States being those that occurred at the Mann Gulch fire in 1949 and the South Canyon Fire in 1994.

The Smokejumper Parachute Landing Injury Database and eSafety are the two databases used to record and collect data regarding smokejumper injuries in the United States. Serious and minor injuries are logged in this database depending on the many factors. Serious injuries are categorized as:

- Requiring hospitalization for greater than 48 hours,
- Bone fractures (excluding finger and toes),
- Severe hemorrhaging,
- Severe nerve, muscle or tendon damage,
- Burns covering more than 5% of the body
- Second- and third-degree burns

According to the 2020 National Smokejumper Program End of Year Summary published by the USFS, an American smokejumper in 2020 had a 99.75% chance of landing free of injury. This is attributed to the rigorous registry of injuries in the past 28 years, when these databases were created. By documenting the rate, severity, and cause of each incident, the USFS has been able to eliminate hazards and create better training.

Jump injuries are infrequent. The National Interagency Fire Center (NIFC) states injuries occur once for every 909 jumps, a rate of 0.11%. Smokejumper personnel take deliberate precautions before deciding whether to jump a particular fire. Multiple factors are analyzed, and then a decision is made as to whether jumping the fire is safe. Bases tend to look for highly motivated individuals who are in superior shape and have the ability to think independently and react to changing environments rapidly. Many smokejumpers have previous experience as hotshots, who provide a strong foundation of wildland firefighting experience and physical conditioning.

== Recruitment ==
Prior to employment as a smokejumper in the United states, applicants are required to have one year of wildland firefighting experience as a minimum. It is said that competitive applicants range closer to three years of experience. Canadian recruitment errs towards a minimum of two years of prior wildland firefighting experience, with a preferred six to seven years.

=== Team members ===
In order to execute a single jump, the number of smokejumpers involved may vary from fire to fire and from country to country. However, in each case teams require multiple jumpers, two spotters, jumpers-in-command, and two pilots. Spotters are specialized smokejumpers who make decisions prior to the jump. They assess fires from the air, determine the approximate landing site, and use paper streamers - dropped from the plane hatch - to measure wind speed. Jumpers-in-command are the initial jumpers. In a pair, they reach land first and report via radio the conditions of the landing site and authorize the secondary jump for remaining smokejumpers.

=== Physical fitness ===
The minimum required physical fitness standards for smokejumpers set by the National Wildfire Coordinating Group are: packout 110 lb (50 kg) for 3 mi (4.8 km) within 90 minutes; run 1.5 mi (2.4 km) in 11 minutes; 25 push-ups in 60 seconds; 45 sit-ups in 60 seconds; and seven pull-ups.

== In popular culture (chronological) ==
- The 1952 film Red Skies of Montana is loosely based on the Mann Gulch fire
- Smokejumpers are featured in the 1985 novel Wildfire by Richard Martin Stern
- The 1996 film Smoke Jumpers is loosely based on Don Mackey's life. Mackey was a smokejumper and one of the 14 fatalities of the 1994 South Canyon fire. In the movie, Mackey (played by Adam Baldwin) pursues job-related accolades while his marriage disintegrates.
- In the 2002 made-for-television movie Superfire, a disgraced pilot joins a group of smokejumpers as they attempt to save a town from a raging wildfire. This film is recognised for its inaccurate description of smokejumper practices.
- In the television show Entourage, Vincent Chase lands a lead role in an action film called Smokejumpers in an episode airing in 2008.
- Smokejumpers are described in Philip Connor's 2011 book Fire Season.
- Author Nora Roberts's 2011 novel Chasing Fire details the lives and loves of a group of smokejumpers at Missoula Smokejumper Base.
- Author M. L. Buchman's Firehawks Smokejumpers Trilogy, published in 2014 and 2015, follows a team of fictitious Oregon-based smokejumpers.
- The 2019 American family comedy film Playing with Fire follows a group of smokejumpers who must watch over three children who have been separated from their parents following an accident. The film stars John Cena, Keegan-Michael Key, John Leguizamo, Brianna Hildebrand, Dennis Haysbert, and Judy Greer.
- 2021 film Those Who Wish Me Dead based on the book by Michael Koryta.
- Sam Forstag, an American labor union leader, politician, and former smokejumper who is the U.S. representative-elect for Montana’s 1st congressional district.

== See also ==
- Wildland fire module
- Helitack
- National Smokejumper Association
