= Chelan National Forest =

Federal reserve in the North Cascades Range, Washington, U.S.

Coordinates: 48°40′N 120°00′W

Chelan National Forest was established in Washington by the U.S. Forest Service on July 1, 1908, with 2,492,500 acres (10,087 km^{2}) from a portion of Washington National Forest. On July 1, 1921, it absorbed the first Okanogan National Forest, but on March 23, 1955, the name was changed back to Okanogan.
