= Earl Cooley (smokejumper) =

American smokejumper (1911–2009)

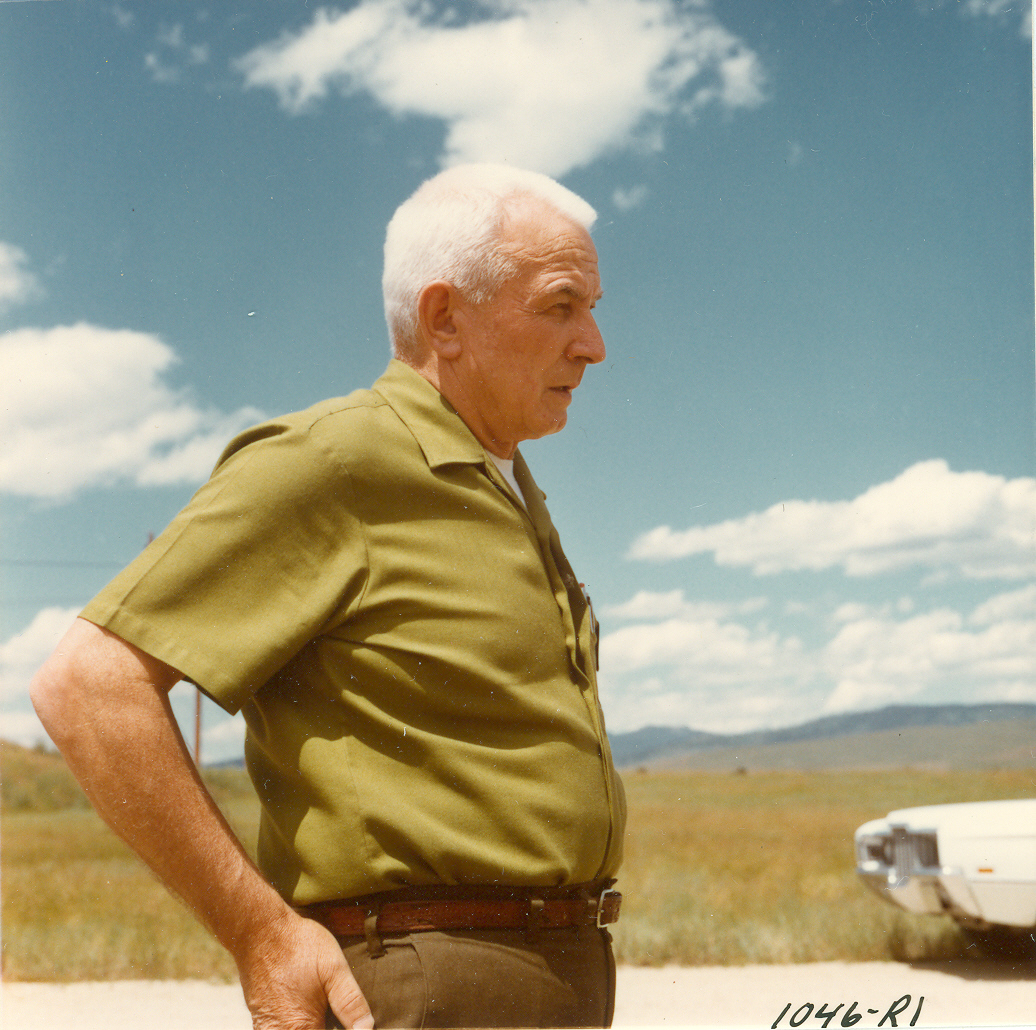
- Died: 9 November 2009

Earl Cooley (1911–2009) was an American smokejumper and founder of the National Smokejumper Association. He spent his career working in the U.S. Forest Service (USFS), where he was concerned with developing new methods of fighting forest fires. In 1940, he was one of the first U.S. firefighters to parachute from a plane onto a wildfire. Cooley went on to train new smokejumpers. After his retirement from the USFS, he set up the National Smokejumper Association, of which he was president from 1993 to 1995.

== Early life ==
Cooley was born in Hardin, Montana, in 1911. He was one of 10 children. When he was 12 years old, his father suffered a substantial financial setback (NYTimes). He dropped out of school to help support his family. He relied on his abilities to hunt, fish, trap, and farm in order to help earn money.

== Education ==
He went back to high school and graduated from the class of 1930. After graduation, he went on to attend and graduate from the forestry school at the University of Montana.

== Career ==
In 1937, Cooley started his career with the Forest Service. The agency was looking for ways to improve the methods used to fight fires. Terrain in the mountains in the 1930s was almost inaccessible, and the roads almost nonexistent (Bramwell). The challenge became focused on finding a way to get to the fire faster. Cooley advocated for the idea of smokejumping – parachuting out of an airplane to a fire to reach it more quickly. This had been tried successfully in other countries including Russia and Germany (Bramwell). On July 12, 1940, Cooley first tested the idea. A forest fire had sprung up along Martin Creek in the Nez Perce National Forest. A crew of two, including Cooley, parachuted to the fire and were dropped additional gear, in a successful proof of the idea (Bushey). After the Forest Service set up the smokejumpers, Cooley began training new smokejumpers. He trained men for what the National Service called “10 o'clock men”, meaning that they could have the fire out by 10 o'clock, on the morning after they had been dispatched (Bramwell).

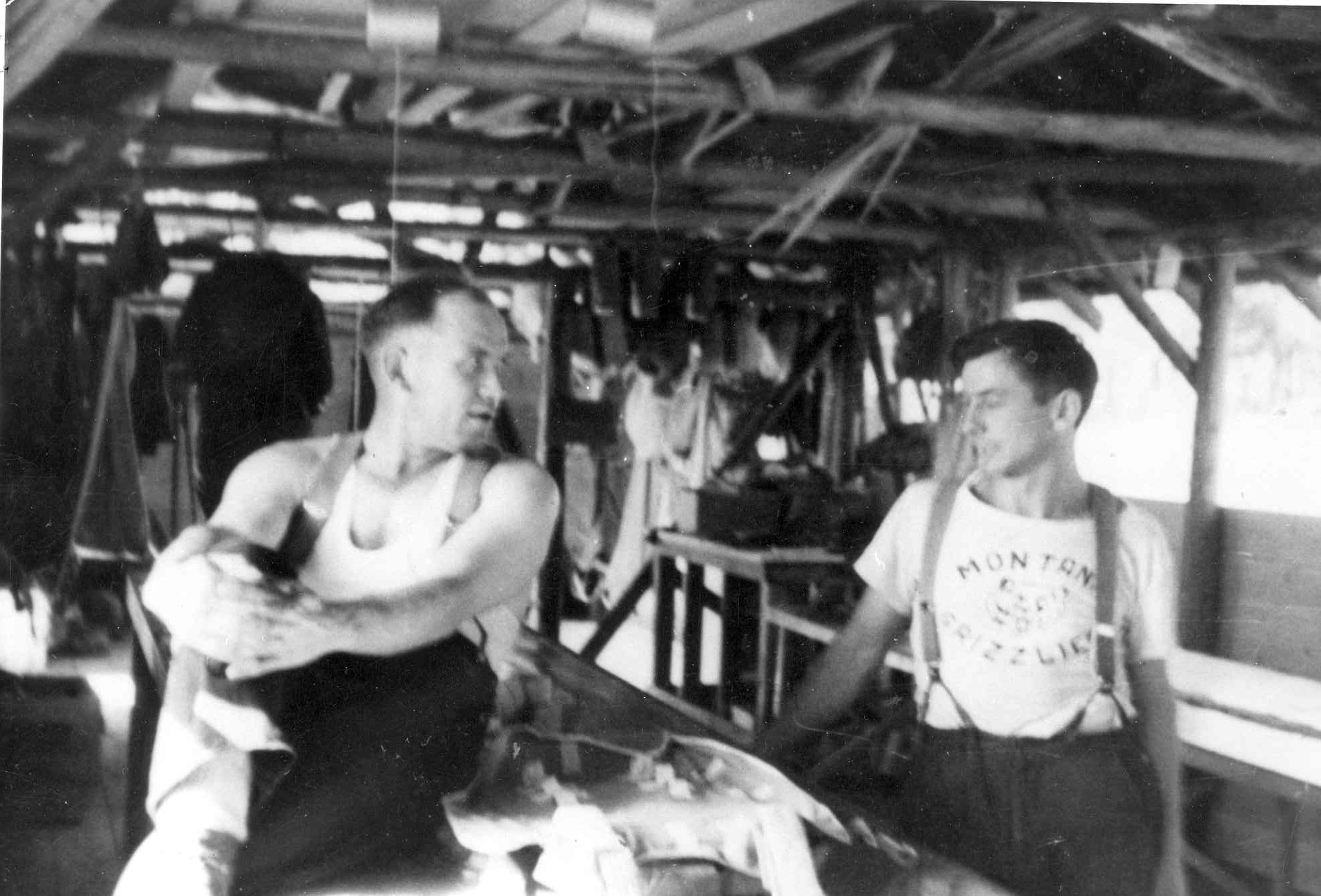
Ray Mattson and Earl Cooley in the smokejumper loft 1940

== Mann Gulch Fire ==
On August 5, 1949, a fire broke out inside of a gulch in Helena National Forest in Montana. The canyon, which had high cliffs, made access for ground crews almost impossible (Maclean). Cooley served as the spotter for the smokejumpers, who gave them the signal to jump. After denying a few spots, and debating another with the foreman, he finally decided on the spot he felt would be best to drop the men (Maclean). After the jumpers landed, the plane made one more pass dumping their equipment on to the ground. As they moved along the gulch, they began to angle downward towards the fire. The fire shifted in what is known as a blow-up and turned on the men. They were quickly overtaken by the flames. There were only three survivors (Maclean). This news effected Cooley harshly. He ensured that every body from his crew was recovered before he went home. Thirteen men were killed, twelve smokejumpers and one forest service ranger. This is still known as the biggest smokejumper tragedy. When later inquired about the Mann Gulch Fire, Cooley said “I am sure I did the right thing that day, but I still look at that map and have thought about it every day since then” (NYTimes). It has been said that until his eighties, he would often take trips to ensure the crosses and various plaques, markers, and memorials were still standing.

== Legacy ==
Cooley continued to serve and protect people with the service of smokejumping. He went on to train countless jumpers to go into the fire and to get it extinguished quickly. His goal was to learn something from each jump to make the job safer and more efficient. He served as base superintendent at the jump base in Missoula, Montana until 1975. When he retired from the Forestry service, Cooley established the National Smokejumping Association in 1989, of which he served as president from 1993 to 1995, after which he retired from the service. He died November 9, 2009, at his home from pneumonia.
