= Holter (surname) =

Holter is a surname. Notable people with the surname include:

- Anton Holter (1831–1921), Norwegian-born American pioneer and entrepreneur
- Bjørn Holter (born 1981), Norwegian singer-songwriter
- Christian Holter (born 1972), Norwegian footballer
- Don Wendell Holter (1905–1999), American United Methodist bishop
- Dwayn Holter (born 1995), Luxembourgish footballer
- Harriet Holter (1922–1997), Norwegian social psychologist
- Hermann Hölter (1900–1989), German Olympic pentathlete, and Generalleutnant during World War II
- Helmut Holter (born 1953), German politician of the party The Left
- Ike Holter (born 1985), American playwright
- Iver Holter (1850–1941), Norwegian composer, conductor and music director of the Oslo Philharmonic
- John Holter (1916–2003), American inventor
- Julia Holter (born 1984), American musician
- Norman Holter (1914–1983), American biophysicist
- Oscar Holter, Swedish and American record producer and songwriter
- Øystein Gullvåg Holter (born 1952), Norwegian sociologist
- Reidar Holter (1892–1953), Norwegian Olympic rower
- Sigurd Holter (1886–1963), Norwegian Olympic sailor
- Lisbeth F.K. Holter Brudal (born 1935), Norwegian psychologist
- Bjørn Atle Holter-Hovind (born 1944), Norwegian media and corporate executive
- Cody Holter (born 1991), American filmmaker
