= Halter (disambiguation) =

A halter is a type of headgear for leading an animal.

Halter may also refer to:

- Halter (horse show)
- Halter hitch, a type of knot
- Halterneck or halter top
- Halter (lacewing), a genus of insects in the family Nemopteridae
- Halteres, singular halter, small organs found in some insects

== See also ==
- Holter (disambiguation)
