= Anathon Aall =

Norwegian academic

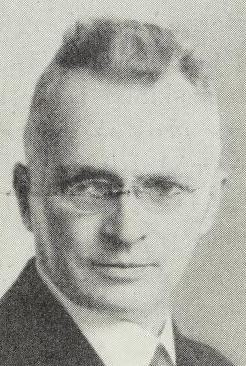
Anathon Aall

Anathon August Fredrik Aall (15 August 1867 – 9 January 1943) was a Norwegian academic, philosopher and psychologist. Originally educated as a theologian, he became a professor of philosophy at University of Oslo.

== Background ==
He was born in Nesseby Municipality in Finnmark, Norway. He was a son of vicar Niels Anton Aall (1833–1896) and his wife Mathilde Susanne Dahl (1842–1910). His grandfather, Hans Cato Aall (1807-1862), was a Member of Parliament and mayor of Hammerfest. He was also a great-great-great-grandson of Nicolai Benjamin Aall, and a great-great-grandnephew of Niels, Jørgen and Jacob Aall.

He was the brother of jurist and Fascist politician Herman Harris Aall (1871-1957). His sister Marna Aall (1873–1948) was married to philosopher Kristian Birch-Reichenwald Aars from 1895 to 1910. Anathon Aall biographed Aars in the first volume of the first edition of the biographical dictionary Norsk biografisk leksikon.

== Career ==
Aall's family moved a lot during his early years, since his father was a parish priest. Aall finished his secondary education in Stavanger in 1886, and graduated from the Royal Frederick University (now University of Oslo) with the degree cand.theol. in 1892. From 1893 to 1897 he undertook religious studies in four European countries. In 1897 he applied for a position as professor of church history at the Royal Frederick University, but he was rejected as the assessment committee found that he was "deviating from the faith of our Church", and hence was "unfit" to lecture for priestly candidates.

After this he studied philosophy in the United Kingdom and experimental psychology in Germany. He was elected as a member of the Norwegian Academy of Science and Letters already in 1898. He published several works, including the 1903 thesis Über die Wirkung der Wiederholung eines Elementes bei gleichzeitiger Vorführung mehrerer Schriftzeichen. He worked as a lecturer at the University of Halle-Wittenberg from 1904 to 1908. He was appointed as a professor of philosophy at the Royal Frederick University in 1908. In addition to researching philosophy, he published works on the history of ideas, and also helped create the Department of Philosophy, which he led until his retirement in 1937. He was the dean of the Faculty of Humanities from 1918 to 1921, and a visiting scholar at the Columbia University from 1924 to 1925. Aall was also involved in temperance work, as well as promoting international peace.

== Personal life ==
From 1899 he was married to Cathrine Antonie Langaard (1863–1926), a daughter of businessman Conrad Langaard. In October 1928 he married Austrian citizen Lily Weiser (1898–1987), an ethnologist. He died in January 1943 in Lunner Municipality. Anathon Aall was the grandfather of Norwegian psychologist Lisbeth F.K. Holter Brudal. His private correspondence and notes are kept by the National Library of Norway.

== Selected works ==
- Geschichte der Logosidee in der christlichen Literatur (1899)
- Philosophische Abhandlunge (1906)
- Logik (1909)
- Die norwegisch-schwedische Union, ihr Bestehen und ihre Lösung (1912)
