= Holter Dam =

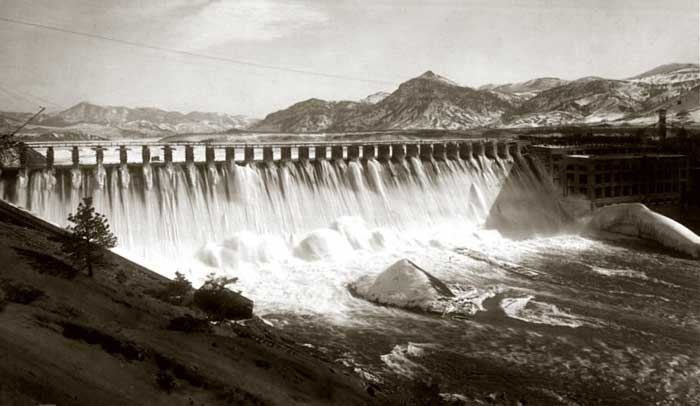
- Holter Dam in 1918
- Official name: Holter Dam
- Location: Lewis and Clark County, Montana, U.S.
- Coordinates: 46°59′30″N 112°00′21″W
- Construction began: 1908
- Opening date: 1918
- Operator(s): NorthWestern Corporation

Dam and spillways
- Impounds: Missouri River
- Height: 124 feet (38 m)
- Length: 1,364 feet (416 m)

Reservoir
- Creates: Holter Lake

Power Station
- Installed capacity: 50 MW
- Annual generation: 319,800,000 KWh (2009)

Holter Dam is a hydroelectric straight gravity dam on the Missouri River about 45 miles (72 km) northeast of Helena, Montana, in the United States. The dam, which was built between 1908 and 1918, is 1,364 feet (416 m) long and 124 feet (38 m) high. The reservoir formed by the dam, Holter Lake (also known as Holter Reservoir) is 25 miles (40 km) long and has a storage capacity of 243,000 acre-feet (300,000,000 m^{3}) of water when full. The dam is a "run-of-the-river" dam because it can generate electricity without needing to store additional water supplies behind the dam.

== Dam and lake ==
=== Holter Dam ===
Holter Dam was built by the United Missouri River Power Company and the Montana Power Company. Samuel Thomas Hauser, a former Territorial Governor of the state of Montana from 1885 to 1887, had had a lengthy career in banking, mining, railroads, ranching, and smelting, but had encountered a series of financial setbacks after the Panic of 1893 which had nearly ruined him financially. In his early 60s, Hauser began to rebuild his finances by branching out into the relatively new industry of hydroelectric power generation. In 1894, he formed the Missouri River Power Company, and won the approval of the United States Congress to build a dam 2 miles (3.2 km) below Stubbs' Ferry (which later was known as Hauser Dam). In 1905, Hauser and other directors of the Missouri River Power Company formed the Helena Power Transmission Company (also known as the "Helena Power and Transmission Company"). The two companies merged on February 16, 1906, to form the United Missouri River Power Company. The merged company completed Hauser Dam on February 12, 1907. The dam was a steel dam built on masonry footings on top of gravel, with the ends of the dam anchored in bedrock on either side of the river. On April 14, 1908, Hauser Dam failed after water pressure undermined the masonry footings (the steel dam itself being structurally sound). United Missouri River Power began reconstruction of Hauser Dam in July 1908 (completing the dam in the spring of 1911).

The United Missouri River Power Company had begun construction of Holter Dam in 1908 before the failure of Hauser Dam. Hauser had conceived of a dam at the present location in 1906 to supply the newly formed Amalgamated Copper Mining Company (a forerunner to Anaconda Copper) with electricity. The dam was named for Anton Holter, president of the Helena Transmission Power Company and by 1908 a director of the United Missouri River Power Company. Hauser formed a subsidiary, the Capital City Improvement Company, to seek investment money and build the dam for the power company. John Ripley Freeman was the dam's design engineer (he also worked on the Hetch Hetchy Aqueduct, the Charles River Dam, the Keokuk Dam, the Los Angeles Aqueduct, and the Panama Canal). Stone & Webster, a Boston-based firm, was the construction company. But cost overruns, waning investor enthusiasm, and the liability associated with the collapse of Hauser Dam nearly drove Samuel Hauser (United Missouri's largest shareholder) into bankruptcy. Amalgamated Copper, which bought 75 percent of United Missouri's power and owned $1 million of its corporate bonds, now began buying its power from Hauser's rival, John D. Ryan's Great Falls Power Company. Construction on Holter Dam was halted in late 1910 after only part of the foundation had been poured. Hauser sold his interest in United Missouri River Power to Ryan, who on October 25, 1912, merged United Missouri River Power with the Butte Electric and Power Company, Billings and Eastern Montana Power Company, and Madison River Power Company to form the Montana Power Company. Montana Power took over not only United Missouri's Canyon Ferry Dam and Hauser Dam but the partially built Holter Dam as well.

Montana Power resumed building the structure in March 1916. The reason for resuming construction was to supply power to the Butte, Anaconda and Pacific Railway and the Chicago, Milwaukee, and St. Paul Railroad. The Chas. T. Main company (whose Western Office was in Butte, Montana) was hired to revisit the design. Henry A. Herrick, an employee of the power company, was the consulting engineer for Main. The major change implemented by Main and Herrick was to install vertical rather than horizontal turbines, although some changes were made to the wastewater system and the dam's downstream face. Stone & Webster continued to be the construction company, and more than 500 men worked on the project. The S. Morgan Smith Company of York, Pennsylvania, designed the water wheels for the turbines. The 1916-1918 construction camp was the largest ever built by Montana Power. There were more than 115 buildings at the construction site, including a bunkhouse and dormitories for unmarried men, cottages for married men, a dining hall, a bathing house, storage sheds, garages, a photography studio, school, hospital, and sewer. Although most of the structures were tents or wooden buildings intended for short-term use, seven of the structures were renovated into permanent housing for the dam's operators. Two more homes were built for operators after construction ended. Montana Power spent $1.3 million in 1916 and $1.5 million in 1917 to finish the dam. Holter was completed and brought online for power generation in 1918. It was the sixth and last dam completed by the company in that decade.

In its original configuration, Holter Dam was expected to be 1,350 feet (410 m) long and 110 feet (34 m) high, but ended up being slightly larger. At the time, Holter was the tallest hydroelectric dam on the Missouri River. The penstocks are 24 to 32 feet (7.3 to 9.8 m) below the water level when the reservoir is full. The dam had four vertical single-runner 15,000-horsepower water turbines, seven main electrical generators and three exciters, and was capable of generating 40,000 kilowatts of power. Aside from the powerhouse and water intakes, the dam has three sections: a central section where water is permitted to flow over the dam, and a left and right section anchored to the bedrock where water is not able to flow over the dam. The dam incorporated flashboards into the crest of the dam to permit overflow. The dam has 31 flashboards, each of them 16 feet (4.9 m) high.

As of 1994, Holter Dam, its powerhouse, its nearby operator housing and abandoned construction camp, its railroad switchyard, and the nearby maintenance buildings are one of the most intact historic hydroelectric generating facilities in Montana.

=== Holter Lake ===
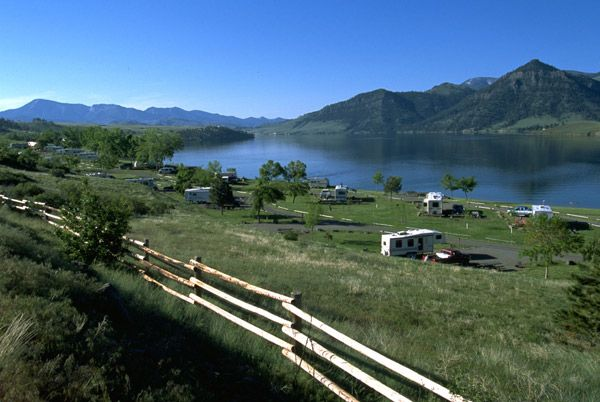
Holter Lake circa the early 2000s, with the Holter Lake Campground in the foreground.

Holter Dam raised the water level behind it by about 100 feet (30 m), creating the 24-mile (39 km) long Holter Lake (also known as Holter Reservoir). Holter Lake has a surface area of 4,800 acres (1,900 ha). The lake has a mean depth of 50 feet (15 m) and a maximum depth of 121 feet (37 m). Holter Lake stores 243,000 acre-feet (300,000,000 m^{3}) of water when full. The distance between Hauser Dam and Holter Lake is 4.6 miles (7.4 km).

The Missouri River runs free for 90 miles (140 km) between Holter Dam and the five dams at Great Falls, Montana.

== Geology beneath and around Holter Dam ==
Madison Limestone forms much of the surface rock through which the Missouri River flows at Holter Dam. The limestone is rich in fossils, mostly brachiopods like clams, mussels, and mollusks. Holter Lake sits atop the Eldorado thrust fault, which juxtaposes Proterozoic Belt Supergroup Greyson Shale over much younger Madison Limestone and is part of the Sevier orogeny.

=== Gates of the Mountains ===
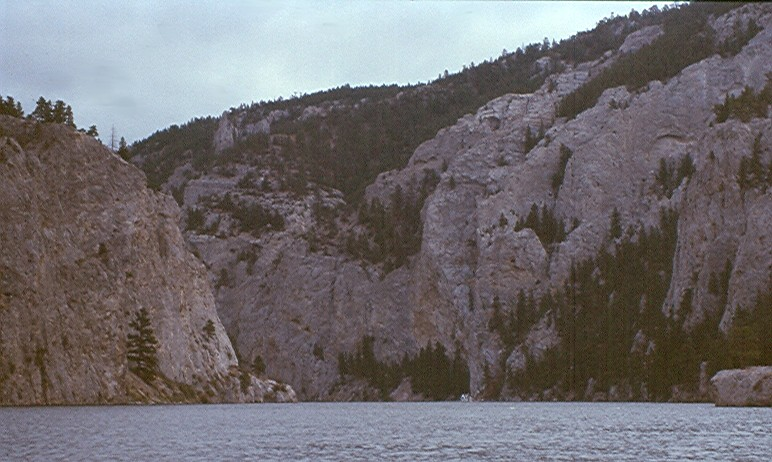
The Madison limestone walls of the Gates of the Mountains.

Holter Lake has two parts, dubbed upper Holter Lake and lower Holter Lake. The central section of the lake is a narrow, 5-mile (8.0 km) neck, marked at its downstream end by the Gates of the Mountains. The Gates of the Rocky Mountains were first recorded when the Lewis and Clark Expedition passed through the area in 1805. Captain Meriwether Lewis wrote on July 19, 1805:

this evening we entered much the most remarkable clifts that we have yet seen. these clifts rise from the waters edge on either side perpendicularly to the height of 1200 feet. ... the river appears to have forced its way through this immense body of solid rock for the distance of 5-3/4 Miles ... I called it the gates of the rocky mountains.

The Gates of the Mountains has been tourist attraction since the period 1886 to 1906, when the steamboat Rose of Helena traversed the Missouri River through this area. Although the Missouri River once ran swiftly through the Gates of the Mountains, Holter Dam drastically reduced the flow of water so that now the area has almost no current. Water levels in the Gates are now 14 feet (4.3 m) higher than they were in 1805.

=== Mann Gulch ===
Between upper and lower Holter Lake, near the Gates of the Mountains, lies Mann Gulch. The gulch was the site of the 1949 Mann Gulch fire, which claimed the lives of 13 smokejumpers. The incident is the subject of author Norman Maclean's book Young Men and Fire. Today, Mann Gulch is most commonly reached by boat.

== Operation of the dam ==
As of 2010, Holter Dam had a 50 megawatt generating capacity. The long-term median flow over and through Holter Dam as of 2005 was 7,610 cubic foot (215 m^{3}) per second. Flows into Holter Lake and over Holter Dam are generally considered to be controlled by flows from Canyon Ferry Dam. The total annual discharge from Holter Dam between 1929 and 1988 was an average of 3,700,000 acre-feet (4.6 km^{3}) per year.

The wooden flashboards of Holter Dam were replaced in 1972.

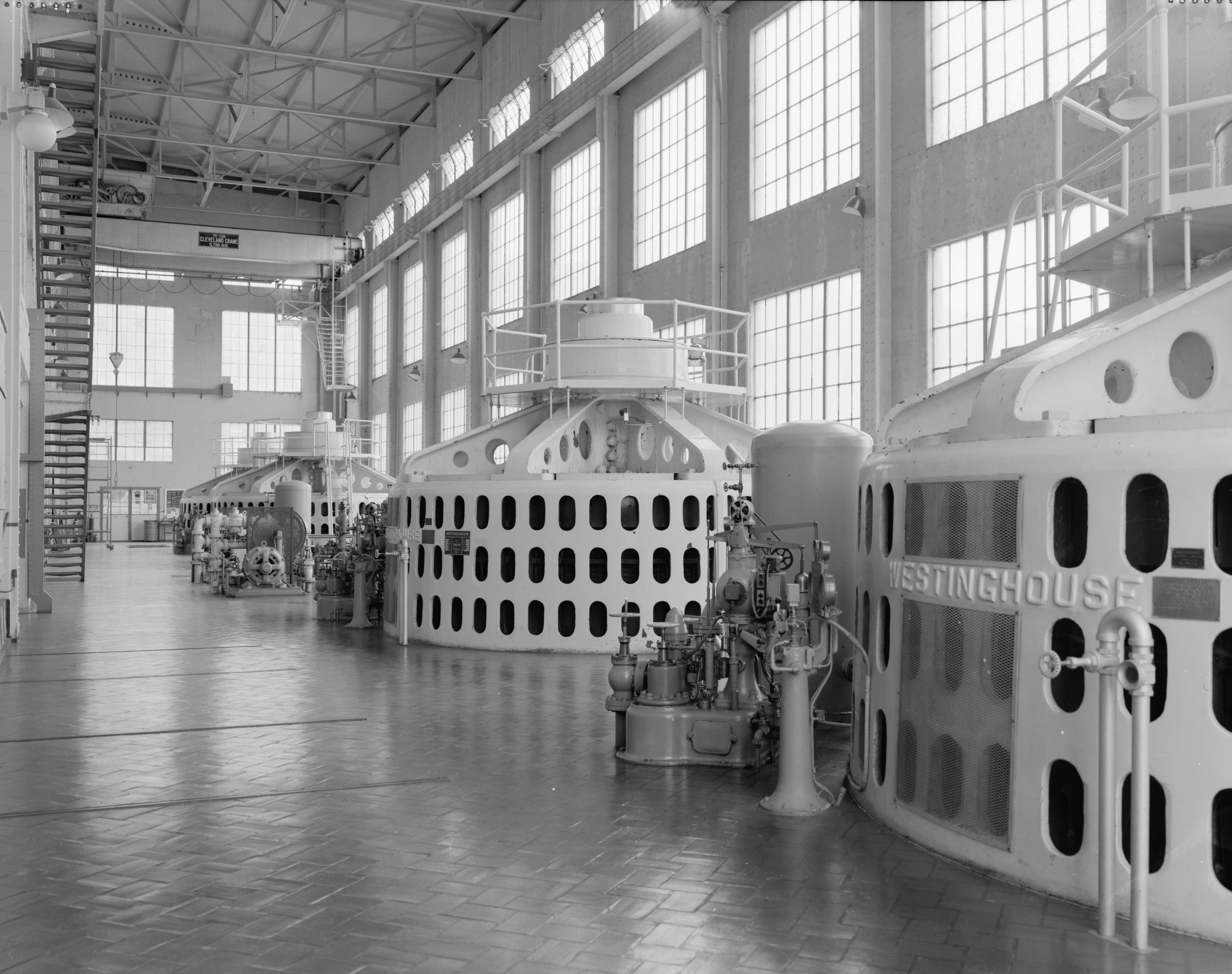
Interior of the Holter Dam powerhouse in 1994. Generating turbine No. 1 is in the foreground.

Montana Power shut down electrical generation at Holter Dam in 1984 after a forest fire destroyed a 100,000-volt electric power transmission line.

In June 1999, Montana Power proposed lowering the level of Holter Lake by 16 feet (4.9 m) for six weeks so that the flashboards could be repaired and replaced. Public criticism of the drawdown was extensive, but Montana Power insisted that it go ahead. But in August 1999, Montana Power put its repair plans on hold.

On November 2, 1999, Montana Power announced it was selling all of its dams and other electric power generating plants to PPL, Inc. for $1.6 billion. The sale was expected to generate $30 million in taxes for the state of Montana (although MPC said the total would be lower). Subsequently, in May 2000 PPL announced it would use small steel cofferdams to drain the water around the flashboards and allow their repair without lowering the level of the lake. The cost of using the cofferdams was $300,000. Twenty-one of the dam's 31 flashboards were replaced.

In November 2001, citizens of Montana upset with energy price increases announced by PPL sought passage of a ballot initiative that would require the state of Montana to buy all of PPL's hydroelectric dams, including Holter Dam. Montana voters rejected the initiative in November 2002. Also in 2001, Holter Dam participated in an emergency management training exercise which, in part, planned for the catastrophic failure of Holter Dam.

The public used to be able to walk across the top of Holter Dam (which provided easy access to both sides of the river), but the dam was closed to the public after the September 11 attacks. Holter Dam was one of the last two such PPL dams to be closed. In 2014, PPL sold Holter Dam and their other Montana dams to NorthWestern Corporation.

While effective at generating electricity, well-designed, and well-engineered, Holter Dam is considered an exceptionally unpleasant structure visually. In 1927, however, the Montana Legislature commissioned painter Ralph E. DeCamp to depict Holter Dam as one of four mural paintings to hang in the state's Law Library (located in the Montana State Capitol). Japanese photographer Toshio Shibata has also photographed the dam, and exhibited this work in 1997 in Chicago at the Museum of Contemporary Art.

== Recreational aspects and fishery management ==
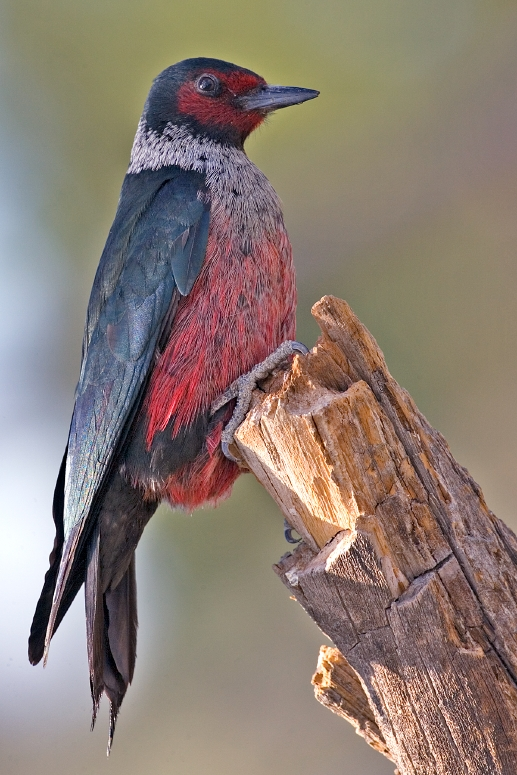
Lewis' woodpecker, a bird first identified near where Holter Dam is located today.

Today, Holter Dam and Holter Lake are a popular recreational area for boating, fishing, hiking, and camping. Just below Holter Dam is the Blue Ribbon trout fishing section of the Missouri River. Five-pound (2.27 kg) rainbow trout are commonly caught here, and trout weighing 10 pounds (4.5 kg) or more have been caught. Many fish are 18 inches (460 mm) or longer. Rainbow trout outnumber brown trout here by a 6:1 ratio. At Holter Lake, rainbow trout weighing 3 pounds (1.4 kg) are commonly caught. There are also stable, significant populations of burbot and stonecats below the dam. Until recently, kokanee salmon and yellow perch were also abundant below the dam, but increasing number of walleye and increased water flows have reduced these populations to as little as 4 percent of historic levels.

Species List
Species	Family	Class	Native to MT
Brook Trout	Trout	Coldwater	Introduced
Brown Trout	Trout	Coldwater	Introduced
Burbot	Codfish	Coldwater	Native
Common Carp	Minnow	Warmwater	Introduced
Fathead Minnow	Minnow	Warmwater	Native
Kokanee	Trout	Coldwater	Introduced
Longnose Sucker	Sucker	Warmwater	Native
Mottled Sculpin	Sculpin		Native
Mountain Whitefish	Trout	Coldwater	Native
Northern Pike	Pike	Warmwater	Introduced
Rainbow Trout	Trout	Coldwater	Introduced
Utah Chub	Minnow		Introduced
Walleye	Perch	Warmwater	Introduced
Westslope Cutthroat Trout	Trout	Coldwater	Native
White Sucker	Sucker	Warmwater	Native
Yellow Perch	Perch	Warmwater	Introduced

According to Montana wildlife officials, "Holter Reservoir has historically been one of the most diverse and productive multi-species fisheries in the state." Rainbow trout, kokanee salmon, walleye, and yellow perch are all found there in abundance. In 1992, "catch-and-release only" regulations were imposed on brown trout to protect the fragile population numbers of these fish. Eight years later, state officials imposed a 50-fish limit on the number of yellow perch which may be caught.

Management of the fishery immediately downstream of Holter Dam necessarily involves management of the dam and reservoir. In autumn 1996, whirling disease was confirmed in the Missouri River below Holter Dam. Fishing on the 15-mile (24 km) stretch of Missouri River below Holter Dam doubled between 1989 and 1999, according to the Montana Department of Fish, Wildlife and Parks. These pressures led state wildlife managers to implement in March 2002 limits on the catch of rainbow trout on this part of the Missouri River. By 2002, fishing levels just below Holter Dam had doubled from their 1993 levels. This section of the Missouri River was now the most heavily fished body of water in the state. In 2009 and 2010, a fungal disease killed large numbers of mature brown trout below Holter Dam.

Holter Dam was relicensed by the federal government in 1997. Until that year, a steering committee composed of state fish and wildlife experts, the Montana Power Company, the United States Bureau of Reclamation, the United States Forest Service, and representatives of agricultural irrigators and sportsmen managed Holter Dam to optimize recreation and to minimize negative impacts on fish and wildlife. The dam's owners were required to conduct an environmental impact statement as part of their 1997 relicensure, however. This document led to new guidelines, adopted by PPL, which requires the dam's owner to not only continue to operate Holter Dam as a run-of-the-river dam but also to maintain water levels behind the dam within a certain range. In January 2011, as part of its management efforts, PPL agreed to donate $1.2 million to fund 41 conservation projects along the Missouri and Madison rivers, which included restoring and increasing riverside vegetation along 4.5 miles (7.2 km) of the Missouri River below Holter Dam and a study of the walleye feeding habits below Holter Dam.

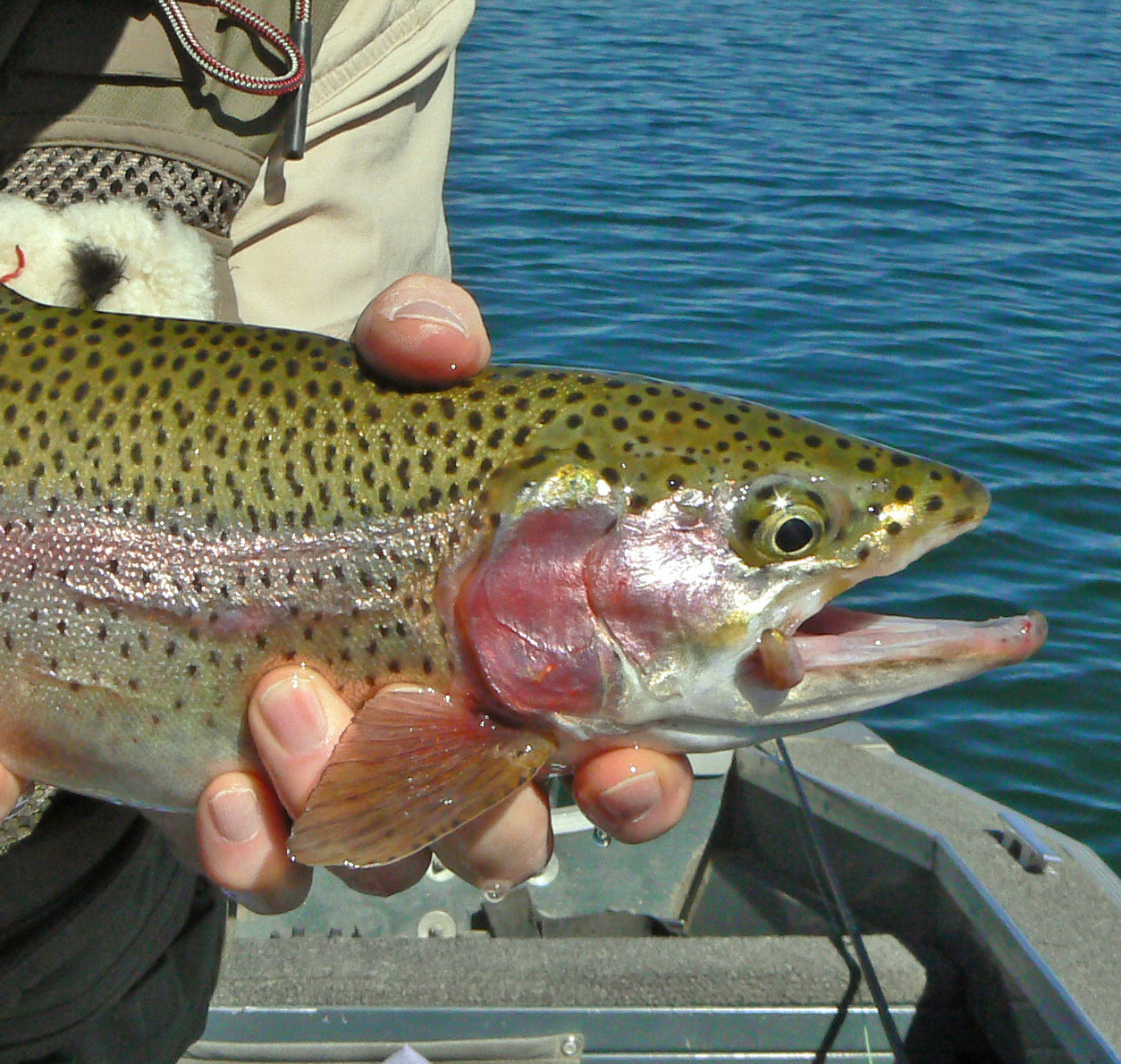
A rainbow trout, the most popular and abundant sport fish below Holter Dam and in Holter Lake.

Drought has also affected the dam's operation. No water was permitted to flow over the dam in 1986 due to drought. In 1992, water flowed over the dam's crest on only a single day. In wetter years, water flows over the dam almost continuously. A severe drought struck the state of Montana beginning in 1999. By May 2004, the dam was permitting only 3,500 cubic foot (99 m^{3}) to 3,000 cubic foot (85 m^{3}) per second downriver. These flows were well below the 4,100 cubic foot (120 m^{3}) per second needed to keep the fishery healthy. The low water flows, coupled with whirling disease, led to a 40 percent drop in big fish (those over 17 inches (430 mm) in length) as well as lower overall numbers of fish immediately below the dam. A 2005 proposal by the managers of the Helena National Forest to draw down Holter Lake by 2 feet (0.61 m) in August 2005 in order to repair Coulter Campground near the Gates of the Mountains had fishermen and recreational outfitters angry due to the likely side-effects on the downstream fishery. But a 2006 study by state wildlife biologists found that, although there had been a slight decline in the number of all fish as well as the sizes of all fish since the sport fish population peaked in 1999, those declines were slight compared to what had been predicted. A 2006-2007 survey of burbot and stonecats in the Missouri River immediately below Holter Dam found four times as many burbot as expected. Heavy snowpack and spring rains in 2008, however, forced dam operators to increase the flow to 11,000 cubic foot (310 m^{3}) per second. By June, flows increased to 16,000 cubic foot (450 m^{3}) per second, permitting a "flush" of the river. Flows stayed double their typical flow rates even in July 2008.

More recently, in 2009 wildlife experts worried that walleye were washing over Holter Dam into the blue-ribbon trout fishery below the dam. Walleyes are predatory fish that eat small trout and yellow perch, and there were calls to alter the overflow procedures at Holter Dam to prevent walleye from escaping into the lower parts of the Missouri River. In 2010, the State of Montana proposed a 10-year fishery management plan for 11 sport and 10 non-sport fish species in Holter Lake. The regulations would have permitted unlimited walleye fishing below Holter Dam as a means of protecting trout from this voracious, nonnative predator species. Final regulations approved in October 2010 permitted fishermen to catch and remove an unlimited number of walleye from Holter Dam to Cascade Bridge, but limited catches to 20 per day (and 40 in possession) from Cascade Bridge to Black Eagle Dam. These limits were reaffirmed by state fisheries regulations in April 2011. The state also increased the number of walleye caught between Hauser Dam and Holter Dam to 10 daily (although all fish 20 to 28 inches (51 to 71 cm) in length had to be released), and set the yellow perch limit on Holter Reservoir down to 25 per day.

Northern pike are also a problem in Holter Lake. The fish has long been present in small numbers in the lake, where it consumes more desirable native species like burbot, brown trout, and cuttrout trout. In March 2011, the Montana Department of Fish, Wildlife and Parks (FWP) set no limit on the number of northern pike anglers may take from Holter Lake and the waters just above it. A month later, the agency said it had completed an environmental assessment of a plan to remove northern pike from the Missouri River and its feeder streams. The agency sought public comment on the plan, which it said would take three to five years to complete at a cost of $20,000. The agency intended to use nets and "passive" fish traps to remove the pike, but might employ "active" measure like electric fishing, gill netting, or trap netting if the passive measures were not effective. In April 2011, the FWP removed all fishing limits on northern pike from the headwaters of the Missouri River to Holter Dam in order to encourage fishermen to eradicate the species. In March 2012, the state began a project to eradicate all northern pike from the headwaters of the Madison, Gallatin, and Jefferson rivers to Holter Dam on the Missouri River.

In October 2011, the state set the limit on trout caught below Holter Dam at three trout per day, only one of which could be over 18 inches (46 cm) in length, and only one of which could be a brown trout. These limits are in effect from 2012 to 2015. In December 2011, the state reported improved numbers of trout below Holter Dam due to several high-volume years of cold water in the Missouri River. The state counted an average number of 6,034 rainbow trout 10 inches (25 cm) or longer per mile (the long-term average was 3,036 per mile). It was the second-highest count on record. An estimated 20 percent of the fish were hatchery-raised trout, however. The state counted 4,429 wild trout per mile.

Holter Lake has been described by one recreational guide as "the most awe-inspiring of the three upper Missouri Lakes." The reservoir is surrounded by the Beartooth Wildlife Management Area, Gates of the Mountains Game Preserve, Gates of the Mountains Wilderness, and the Sleeping Giant Wilderness Study Area. There are abundant numbers of bald eagles, bighorn sheep, elk, falcons, golden eagles, hawks, mountain goats, osprey, and pelicans in the area. Meriwether Lewis first identified Lewis's woodpecker nearby. Birds of prey can routinely be seen plucking fish from Holter Lake and the Missouri River below the dam. An open-air tourboat offers river-based tours of the Gates of the Mountains. The Bureau of Land Management (BLM) manages much of the surrounding public lands as a Recreation Area. BLM maintains four campgrounds at Holter Lake: Beartooth Landing (accessible only by boat; no land access), Holter Lake, Log Gulch, and Departure Point. BLM also controls access to the river below Holter Dam. BLM reconstructed the Holter Dam Campground in 2007. Conservation projects are also underway at Holter. As part of its federal licensing agreement, PPL Montana donated $1.2 million in 2011 to fund 41 conservation projects along the Missouri and Madison rivers. These included a project to restore and enhance riverside vegetation along a 4.5-mile (7.2 km) stretch of the Missouri River just below Holter Dam (vegetation helps cool the water, enhancing trout populations), a study of hatchery-raised rainbow trout survival rates in Holter Lake, and a study of walleye feeding habits below Holter Dam.

== Bibliography ==
- Aarstad, Rich; Arguimbau, Ellen; Baumler, Ellen; Porsild, Charlene L.; and Shovers, Brian. Montana Place Names From Alzada to Zortman. Helena, Mont.: Montana Historical Society Press Press, 2009.
- "Agency to Consider Catch-and-Release Only for Rainbow on River Section." Associated Press. August 9, 2001.
- Anez, Bob. "One-Rainbow Limit Imposed on Section of Missouri River." Associated Press. November 8, 2001.
- Anez, Bob. "PP&L Global Buying Montana Power Plants for $1.6 Billion." Associated Press. November 2, 1998.
- Artner, Alan G. "Shibata's America." Chicago Tribune. October 31, 1997.
- Auchly, Bruce. "Burbot Anglers Count on Ugly Fish's Wander and Lust Plight." Great Falls Tribune. February 4, 2010.
- Axline, Jon. Conveniences Sorely Needed: Montana's Historic Highway Bridges, 1860-1956. Helena, Mont.: Montana Historical Society Press, 2005.
- Babcock, Michael. "Agency to Increase Flow of Mighty Mo." Great Falls Tribune. May 24, 2008.
- Babcock, Michael. "Big Holter-Area Rainbow on Rocks." Great Falls Tribune. December 19, 2004.
- Babcock, Michael. "Canyon Ferry Filling Up." Great Falls Tribune. June 12, 2005.
- Babcock, Michael. "Fill 'Em Up! We Can Use the Water." Great Falls Tribune. June 12, 2008.
- Babcock, Michael. "Holter Dam Repair Will Be Tough on Area Businesses." Great Falls Tribune. June 14, 1999.
- Babcock, Michael. "It's Fishing Season." Great Falls Tribune. May 13, 2004.
- Babcock, Michael. "Missouri River." Great Falls Tribune. May 13, 2004.
- Babcock, Michael. "Missouri Trout Population Decline Not As Steep As Feared." Great Falls Tribune. December 3, 2006.
- Babcock, Michael. "Mo Flourishes After the Flush." Great Falls Tribune. July 10, 2008.
- Babcock, Michael. "Most Heavily Fished? The Blue Ribbon Mo." Great Falls Tribune. May 13, 2004.
- Babcock, Michael. "Trout Limit Placed on Missouri." Great Falls Tribune. November 9, 2001.
- Badovinac, Trapper. Fly Fishing: Montana's Missouri River. Helena, Mont.: Farcountry Press, 2003.
- Berg, Christian. "Montanans Reject Buying PPL Dams." Allentown Morning Call. November 7, 2002.
- "BLM Recreation Sites on Holter and Hauser Lakes Open Today." Great Falls Tribune. May 7, 2010.
- "Burbot, Stonecat Fisheries Study Wrapped Up." Great Falls Tribune. May 17, 2007.
- "The Capital City Power Plant of the United Missouri River Power Company." Engingeering News. June 1910.
- Clary, Jean. Lewis & Clark on the Upper Missouri. Stevensville, Mont.: Stoneydale Press Publishing Co., 1999.
- Dennison, Mike. "A New Plan for Holter Dam Repairs." Great Falls Tribune. May 25, 2000.
- "Fishing Access to All PPL Dams in Montana Now Prohibited." Associated Press. May 9, 2003.
- "Fishing Pressure on Missouri, Yellowstone Rising Rapidly." Associated Press. August 22, 1999.
- Gallagher, Susan. "Drive to Buy Montana Hydroelectric Dams Announced." Associated Press. November 20, 2001.
- Goodspeed, Weston Arthur. The Province and the States, A History of the Province of Louisiana Under France and Spain, and of the Territories and States of the United States Formed Therefrom. Madison, Wisc.: Weston Historical Association, 1904.
- Grant, Tina. International Directory of Company Histories. Chicago: St. James Press, 2007.
- Hall, J.H. Montana. Helena, Mont.: Independent Publishing Co., 1912.
- Herbert, Tony and McKelvey, Conn. "Plan Could Harm World-Class Wild Trout Fishery." Great Falls Tribune. October 21, 2009.
- "Holter Dam Campground to Soon Close for the Season." Great Falls Tribune. July 13, 2007.
- "Holter Drawdown Causes Grumbling Among Lake Users." Associated Press. June 14, 1999.
- "Holter Hydroelectric Facility." HAER No. MT-94-A/HAER MONT 25-WOCRE-1A. Rocky Mountain Regional Office. Historic American Engineering Record. National Park Service. November 1994. Accessed 2010-06-15.
- Jackson, Donald C. Building the Ultimate Dam: John S. Eastwood and the Control of Water in the West. Norman, Okla.: University of Oklahoma Press, 2005.
- Jackson, Donald C. Dams. Brookfield, Vt.: Ashgate, 1997.
- Johnson, Charles S. "MPC to Sell Power Plants." The Missoulian. December 10, 1997.
- Johnsgard, Paul A. Lewis and Clark on the Great Plains: A Natural History. Lincoln, Neb.: University of Nebraska Press, 2003.
- King, Ernest W. "Annual Address." Journal of the Association of Engineering Societies. March 1906.
- Lambert, Kirby; Burnham, Patricia Mullan; and Near, Susan R. Montana's State Capitol: The People's House. Helena, Mont.: Montana Historical Society Press, 2002.
- Lee, Sonja. "Preparing for the Big One." Great Falls Tribune. April 5, 2001.
- Lomax, Becky. "Gates Open to Paddlers." Great Falls Tribune. August 9, 2007.
- Malone, Michael P. The Battle for Butte: Mining and Politics on the Northern Frontier, 1864-1906. Seattle: University of Washington Press, 2006.
- McRae, W.C. and Jewell, Judy. Moon Montana. Berkeley, Calif.: Avalon Travel Publishing, 2009.
- Miller, David L. The Complete Paddler: A Guidebook to the Missouri River From the Headwaters to St. Louis. Helena, Mont.: Farcountry Press, 2005.
- "Montana in Short." Associated Press. August 24, 2005.
- "Montana Power Earnings Show Great Business Growth." Electrical World. April 28, 1917.
- Mount, Ellis. Sci-Tech Archives and Manuscript Collections. New York: Routledge, 1989.
- "MPC Casts Doubt on $30 Million Tax Payment on Dam Sales." Associated Press. March 3, 1999.
- "MPC Properties Sold." Associated Press. November 2, 1998.
- Murphy, Jerre C. The Comical History of Montana: A Serious Story for Free People. San Diego: E.L. Scofield, 1912.
- Newhouse, Eric. "Anglers Praise Holter Dam Repairs." Great Falls Tribune. September 18, 2000.
- Perez, Jennifer. "Catch-and-Release Policy Discussed in Meeting." Great Falls Tribune. October 3, 2001.
- "PPL Montana Says Repairs to Holter Dam Will Cause Minimal Disruption." Associated Press. May 25, 2000.
- Puckett, Karl. "The Pelican Puzzler." Great Falls Tribune. September 9, 1999.
- "Report of Committee on Memorials." Proceedings of the Second War Convention, National Electric Light Association. National Electric Light Association, June 13-14, 1918.
- Robbins, Chuck. Flyfisher's Guide to Montana. Belgrade, Mont.: Wilderness Adventures Press, 2005.
- Robbins, William G. Colony and Empire: The Capitalist Transformation of the American West. Lawrence, Kan.: University Press of Kansas, 1994.
- Sample, Michael. Fishing Montana: An Angler's Guide to the Big Sky's Best Streams and Lakes. 3rd ed. Guilford, Conn.: Globe Pequot Press, 1998.
- Sears, James W. and Hendrix, Marc S. "Lewis and Clark Line and the Rotational Origin of the Alberta and Helena Salients, North American Cordillera." In Orogenic Curvature: Integrating Paleomagnetic and Structural Analyses. Aviva J. Sussman and Arlo B. Weil, eds. Washington, D.C.: Geological Society of America, 2004.
- Shearer, Benjamin F. Louisiana to Ohio. Westport, Conn.: Greenwood Press, 2004.
- Shors, Benjamin. "Holter Lake Draining to Go Ahead." Great Falls Tribune. June 15, 1999.
- United States Shipping Board Emergency Fleet Corporation. Hearings before the Committee on Commerce, United States Senate, Sixty-fifth Congress, Second Session, on S. 170. United States Congress. Senate Committee on Commerce. Washington, D.C.: Government Printing Office, 1918.
- Upper Missouri River Reservoir Fisheries Management Plan, 2010-2019. Montana Fish, Wildlife and Parks Commission. Montana Department of Fish, Wildlife and Parks. May 13, 2010. Accessed 2010-06-13.
- Van Swearingen, Hugh. "Fires Strike the West." Associated Press. August 29, 1984.
- Wegmann, Edward. The Design and Construction of Dams. New York: John Wiley & Sons, 1918.
- Wright, John B. Montana Places: Exploring Big Sky Country. Mesilla, N.M.: New Mexico Geographical Society, 2000.
