= Sleeping Giant Wilderness Study Area =

Protected area in Montana, United States

- Location within the United States
- Location: Montana, U.S.
- Nearest city: Helena, Montana
- Coordinates: 46°55′56″N 112°02′50″W
- Area: 6,666 acres (2,698 ha)
- Established: 1981 (first designation; de-designated in 1982); 1985 (re-designation)
- Governing body: Bureau of Land Management

Sleeping Giant Wilderness Study Area is a non-motorized recreation area located on the west side of the Missouri River and Holter Lake located about 30 miles (48 km) north of Helena, Montana. Designated as a wilderness study area in 1981, the Sleeping Giant Wilderness Study Area contains approximately 6,666 acres (2,698 ha) of nearly roadless land, about half of which is forested. A portion of the Lewis and Clark National Historic Trail is contained inside the study area.

== Definition of a wilderness study area ==
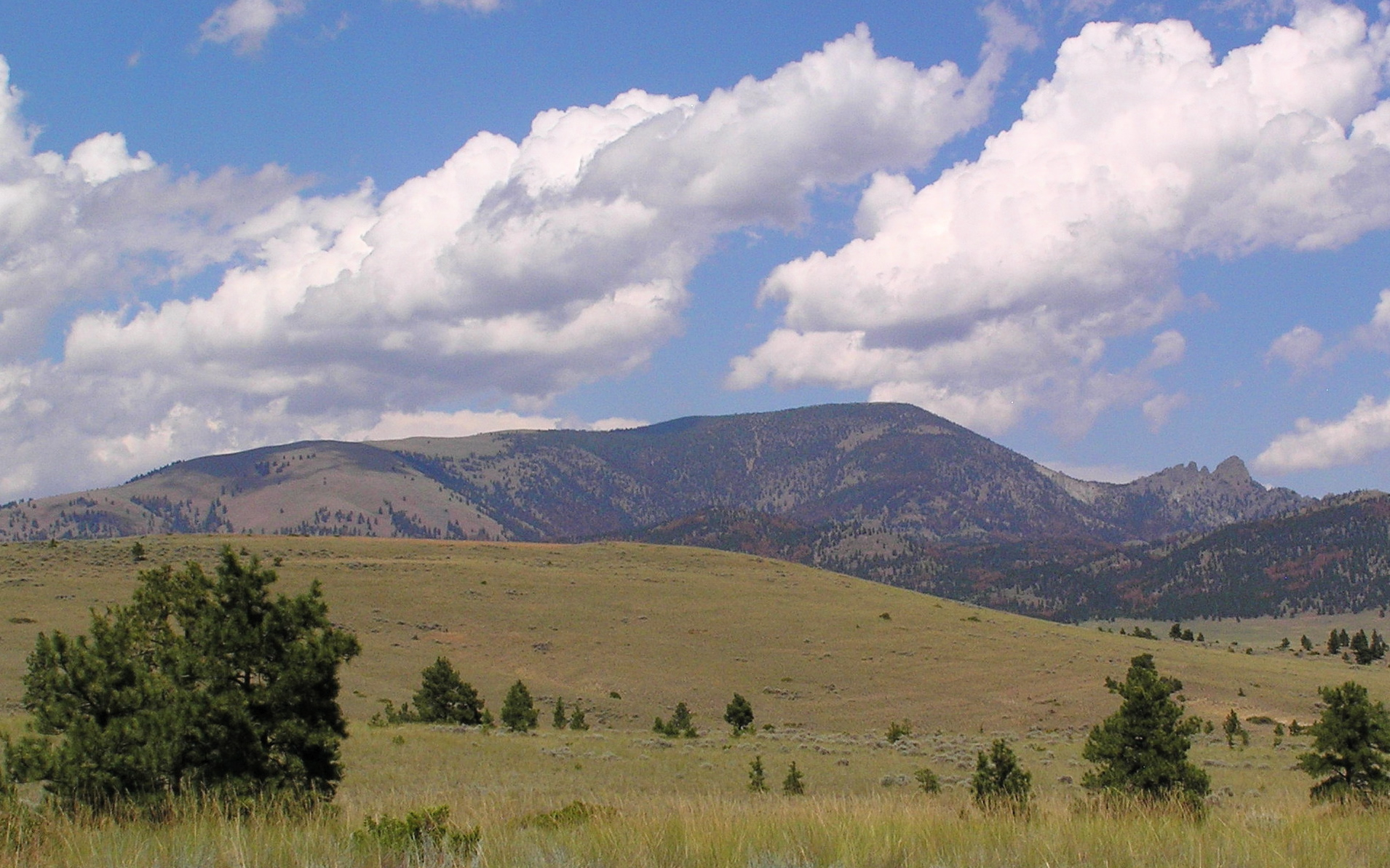
The Sleeping Giant formation, image taken from the south, looking north

Wilderness study areas (WSAs) are authorized by the Federal Land Policy and Management Act of 1976. The Act directed the Bureau of Land Management (BLM) of the United States Department of the Interior to inventory and study all federally owned roadless areas for possible designation as a Wilderness Area. To qualify as a wilderness study area, the land must be a roadless area of at least 5,000 acres (2,000 ha) (or be of "manageable size"), generally unaffected by human development, provide opportunities for primitive or unconfined recreation, and have special ecological, geological, educational, historical, scientific and/or scenic value. Until the United States Congress makes a final determination on the status of a wilderness study area, the BLM must manage the area as a wilderness.

== The Sleeping Giant Wilderness Study Area ==
=== Description of the Sleeping Giant area ===
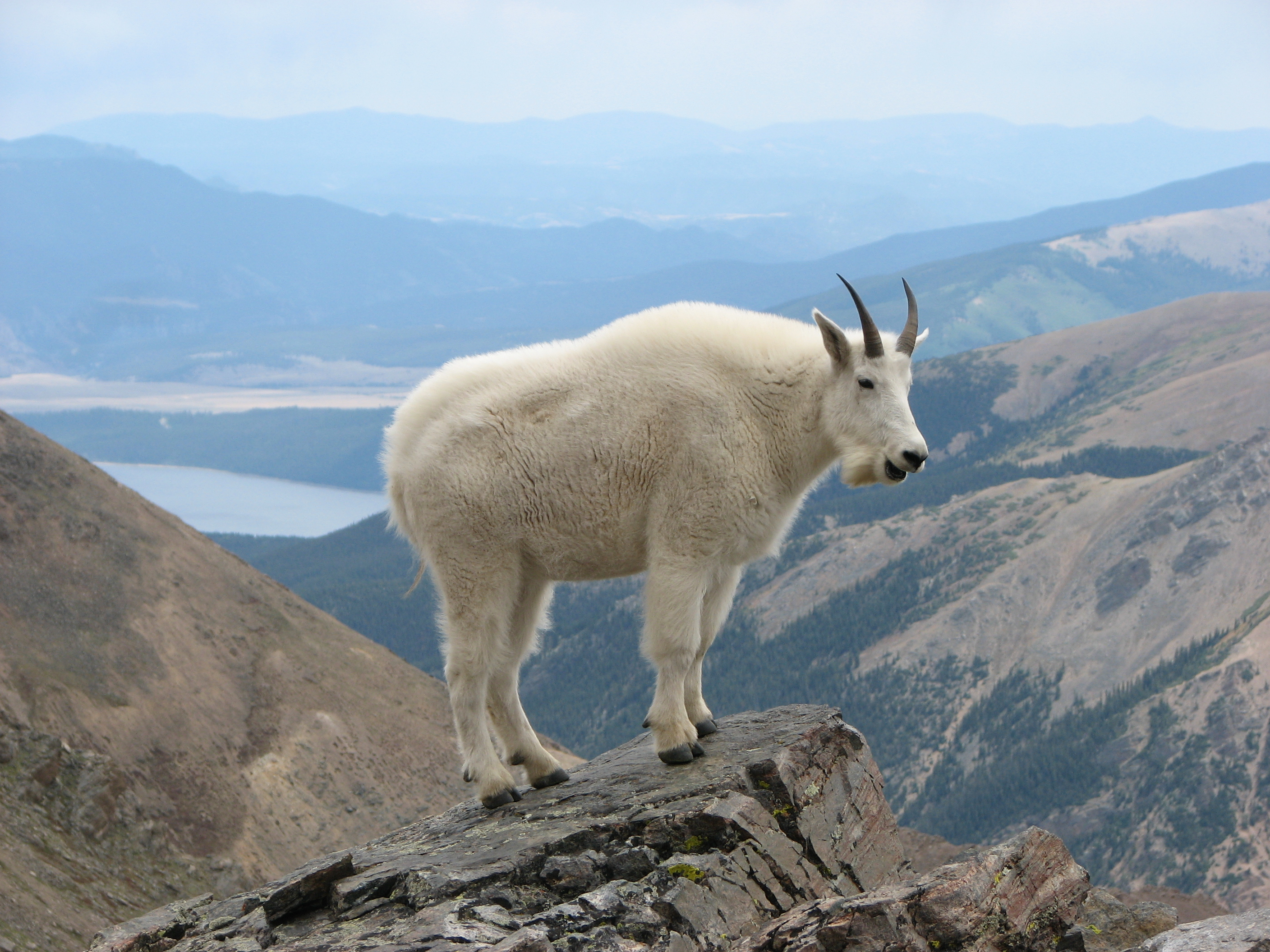
The Sleeping Giant wilderness study area is an important habitat for mountain goats.

The Sleeping Giant region is a roughly rectangular area bounded by Interstate 15 on the west and Holter Lake on the east, the south boundary runs from the Hilger Valley to the Ming Bar, and the north boundary runs from the northern edge of the Oxbow Bend of Holter Lake to Interstate 15. The Gates of the Mountains Wilderness is nearby, beginning on the opposite side of Holter Lake. There is an airplane landing strip on the Ming Bar east of the study area.

The wilderness study area (WSA) contains important wildlife habitat. It is named after the "Sleeping Giant" formation (part of which is formally designated Beartooth Mountain, elevation 6,792 feet (2,070 m)), a historic and noted natural landmark contained within the proposed wilderness area. The "Sleeping Giant" outline is a widely used marketing tool by area businesses. The mountains in the WSA range from 3,600 feet (1,100 m) to approximately 6,800 feet (2,100 m) in elevation. About half the WSA is forested, and roughly 20 creeks and streams drain the area. The Sleeping Giant study area is a critical mountain goat habitat in the state of Montana, and also contains significant populations of bald eagles, bighorn sheep, black bear, brook trout, cutthroat trout, elk, golden eagles, mule deer, osprey, and peregrine falcons.

Human development within the study area is minimal. The BLM maintains several seasonally accessible dirt roads (Bear Gulch Road, Bear Ridge Road, Powerline Road, Powerline Spar, and Woodsiding Road) in the WSA, and a single year-round accessible road (Medicine Gulch Road) in the western portion of the study area. Interstate 15 and Lyons Creek Road (a county access road) border the western part of the wilderness study area. The Sleeping Giant area also includes 7 miles (11 km) of horse riding and hiking trails, and 40 primitive camping sites at Holter Lake. Several abandoned structures built by early white settlers near the lake still exist but are not maintained for use.

The 3,801-acre (1,538 ha) Sheep Creek Wilderness Study Area is located immediately west of and adjacent to the Sleeping Giant WSA. Both WSAs are surrounded by a BLM-designated 11,609 acres (4,698 ha) "Area of Critical Environmental Concern" (ACEC), and another 6,691 acres (2,708 ha) of BLM land where wheeled vehicle use is managed to protect the environment. This area's travel management plan was updated in 2003.

=== History of the Sleeping Giant area ===
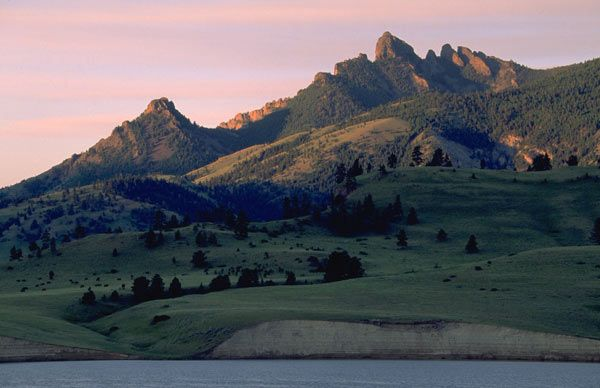
The "head" of the Sleeping Giant, image taken from the north, looking to the south

The Sleeping Giant landform was well-known to Native Americans in the United States. Members of Native American tribes as far away as present-day Minnesota knew of the landmark, and told the leaders of the Lewis and Clark Expedition about it. The Lewis and Clark Expedition camped below the Sleeping Giant and explored the area around it during their initial passage through the region in 1805.

The Sleeping Giant region was designated a wilderness study area in 1981. In late 1982, United States Secretary of the Interior James G. Watt removed the Sleeping Giant area from protection as a WSA, concluding that the area would never meet the definition of a wilderness area because it was too small and some mineral rights in the area were owned by private citizens or companies. The Sleeping Giant region was granted WSA status again in 1985, and the WSA enlarged in 1988. In 1991, the BLM recommended to Congress that the Sleeping Giant area be formally designated as wilderness.

In 1991, BLM estimated that about 40 percent of the Sleeping Giant WSA contained privately owned oil and natural gas mineral rights. In 1997, Lewis and Clark National Forest Supervisor Gloria Flora exercised statutory authority to ban new oil and gas development leases in the forest east of the Sleeping Giant WSA for 15 years. Petroleum industry interests sued to overturn the decision, but U.S. district and appellate courts refused to do. Oil and gas drilling companies asked for permission to drill exploratory wells and conduct seismic petroleum exploration in the Sleeping Giant WSA in the late 1990s, but BLM denied the request. BLM did grant a drilling request for non-WSA land north of the Sleeping Giant WSA.

In 2007, BLM proposed continuing to manage the Sleeping Giant region as a wilderness area, even though Congress had not yet acted on its 1991 recommendation to formally designate it as such. The same year, the Montana Wilderness Association (MWA) began meeting with local residents in a long-term effort to build public support for formally designating the Sleeping Giant WSA a wilderness. At present, the MWA is concerned that oil and gas drilling proposals in the nearby Area of Critical Concern could have a negative impact on the wilderness character of the area.

== Bibliography ==
- "BLM Wants to Close 'User-Created' Trails in Southwestern Montana." Associated Press. June 21, 2007.
- Bradley, Carol. "Oil, Gas Companies Say They're Fed Up With Waiting Game." Great Falls Tribune. May 30, 2001.
- Bradley, Carol. "Rocky Mountain Front." Great Falls Tribune. May 30, 2001.
- Butte Office. Bureau of Land Management. DRAFT Butte Resource Management Plan and Environmental Impact Statement. Volume I. BLM/MT/PL-07/010+1610. Butte, Mont.: Bureau of Land Management, U.S. Dept. of the Interior, June 2007. Accessed 2010-07-02.
- Byron, Eve. "Group Seeks Wilderness Status for Sleeping Giant, Adjacent Lands." Helena Independent Record. March 17, 2007.
- Kilmer, Tom. "Sleeping Giant Comments Due June 22." Queen City News. June 19, 2003.
- "National Landscape Conservation System – Wilderness Study Areas." Bureau of Land Management. United States Department of the Interior. December 2009. Accessed 2010-06-30.
- "Sleeping Giant Wilderness Study Area." Butte Field Office. Bureau of Land Management. United States Department of the Interior. June 17, 2009. Accessed 2010-06-30.
- "Wilderness Society Attacks Watt Over Protected Land." Associated Press. August 10, 1983.
- Wilderness Study Areas. National Landscape Conservation System. Bureau of Land Management. United States Department of the Interior. March 11, 2010. Accessed 2010-06-30.
