= Holter =

Holter may refer to:

- Holter monitor, ambulatory health monitor
- Holter (surname)
