= Lisbeth F.K. Holter Brudal =

Norwegian psychologist (1935–2025)

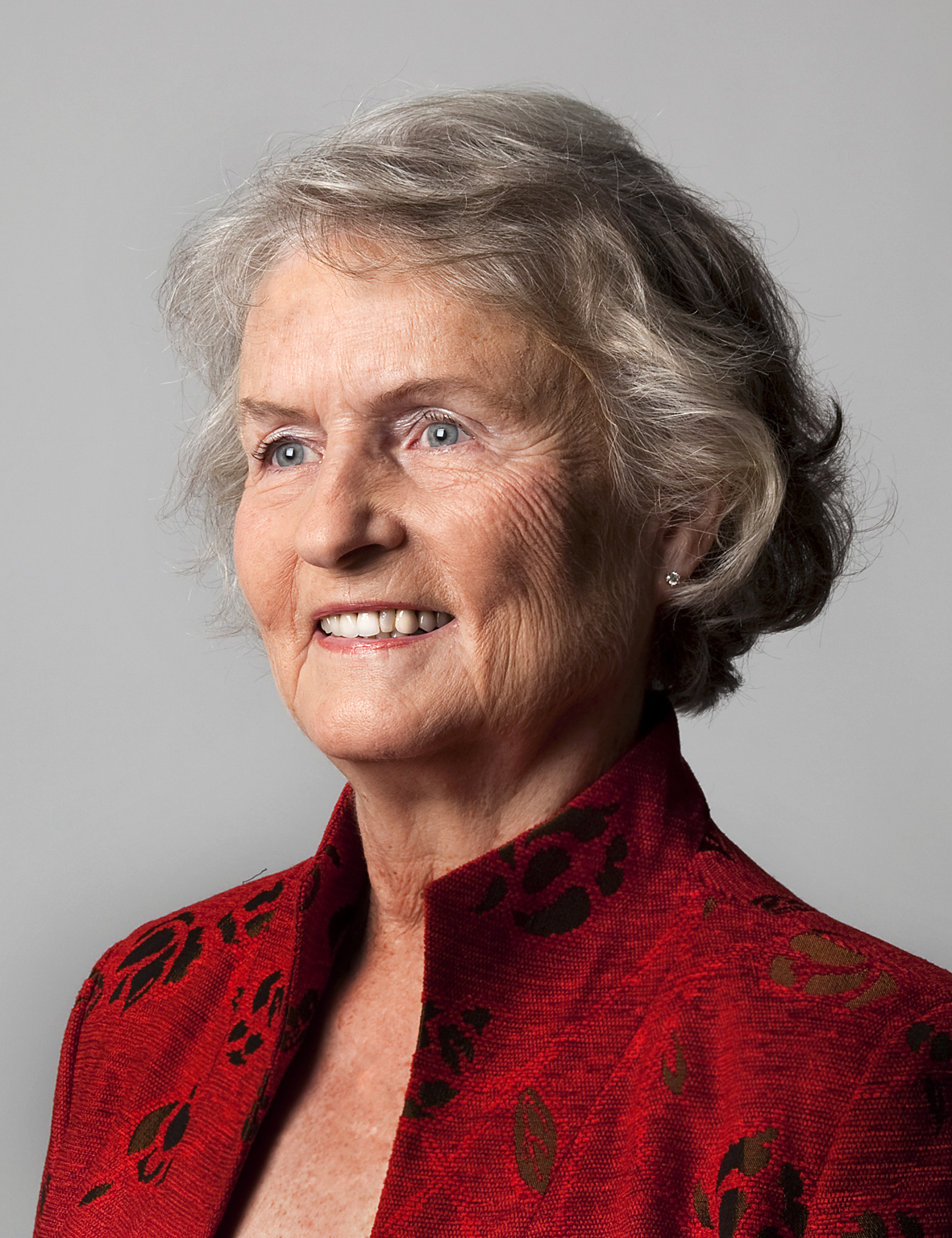
- Brudal
- Born: 19 September 1935; Oslo, Norway
- Died: 20 December 2025 (aged 90)
- Occupations: Psychotherapist, researcher, supervisor, author

Lisbeth F.K. Holter Brudal (19 September 1935 – 20 December 2025) was a Norwegian psychologist, particularly known for her pioneer work in the areas of birth psychology and communication.

== Biography ==
Brudal is the granddaughter of Anathon Aall, an internationally known philosopher and psychologist. He was one of the founders of Institute of Psychology in Oslo in 1909. Aall was professor and leader of Institute of Psychology for nearly 30 years.

Brudal graduated as a psychologist in 1964. She had a Doctor of Philosophy degree from the Faculty of Medicine at the University of Oslo (PhD.), specialising in clinical psychology. She was married to psychologist Paul Jan Brudal, a specialist in clinical psychology and an author. They had two children and five grandchildren.

Brudal died on 20 December 2025, at the age of 90.

== Work ==
For several years, Brudal was a lecturer and assistant professor at the Institute of Psychology at the University of Oslo. In 1985 she founded the Institute of Tocology (the study of birth) and Family Psychology which is a private institute, and she remained head of the institute until 2011. The institute has at times had four affiliated psychologists, focusing especially on the treatment of people in crisis. For many years the institute collaborated with the university's Institute of Psychology in the areas of guidance and teaching of students.

In 2016, Brudal, together with colleagues, co-founded the Institute of Empathic Communication (IEC). She was known for having developed a separate area within psychology: Birth Psychology. In the context of this pioneering work she did research on men's psychological reactions associated with pregnancy, childbirth and postnatal care. She taught for many years, held courses and supervised health workers in birth psychology and crisis intervention in Sweden.

Brudal was a pioneer in the field of communication, having developed a tool for communication - Empathic Communication (EC). She published a series of films about this tool and its usage.

Brudal was known for her versatile professional profile and has published 18 books and several articles on subjects such as birth psychology, psychological crises, psychopathy, dreams, consciousness, positive psychology and empathy. The books have been translated into several languages, including Russian. She has also written a novel.

In 2015, Brudal launched her book: Empathic Communication: The Missing Link. In January 2015, the book was no. 1 on the best seller list on Amazon in three categories: Emotions & Feelings, Parenting, Professional Development. In 2017, she published her article: Dialogic Moments and Empathic Communication. In 2018, she launched her book: Hva er Empatisk Kommunikasjon?, a handbook supplement to Empathic Communication: The Missing Link.

== Awards ==
2015:- Amazon Bestseller - Lisbeth Holter Brudal - «Empathic Communication: The Missing Link»

Brudal was awarded the King's Medal of Merit in Gold in 2011. She won the media prize from The Norwegian Psychological Association in 2007 and won the prize from "Birth in Focus" in 1995.

== Bibliography ==
=== Doctoral Thesis ===
- Psykiske reaksjoner hos kvinner og menn i tilknytning til fødsel, del I, II og lll. Det medisinske fakultet. Universitet i Oslo (1981); ISBN 9788276745573

=== Textbooks ===
- Fødselens psykologi. Lærebok i forebyggende arbeid. Aschehoug 1983. ISBN 82-03-12553-0
- Psykiske reaksjoner i et nytt perspektiv. Tano 1989. ISBN 9788251826464
- Helsepsykologi. Aktivering av psykiske ressurser ved sykdom. Tano 1993. ISBN 9788251831239
- Drømmepsykologi. Om drøm, bevissthet og kreativitet. Co-Author: Jan Brudal. Universitetsforlaget 1996. ISBN 9788200226468
- Psykiske reaksjoner ved svangerskap, fødsel og barseltid. 3. opplag. Fagbokforlaget 2008. ISBN 9788276745573
- Drømmens psykologi. Ny forståelse og praktisk bruk av drøm. Co-Author: Paul Jan Brudal. Fagbokforlaget 2008. ISBN 9788245007428
- Positiv psykologi. 3. opplag. Fagbokforlaget 2010. ISBN 9788245003949
- Empatisk Kommunikasjon. Et verktøy for menneskemøter. 2. opplag. Gyldendal Akademisk 2016. ISBN 9788205474529

=== Popular Science ===
- Å få barn. Fødselspsykologi for foreldre. 4. opplag. Aschehoug 1979. ISBN 9788203098338
- En reise i rommet. Vårt ytre og indre univers. Aschehoug 1987. ISBN 9788203153433
- Dødsbevissthet. Om å velge livet eller døden. Universitetsforlaget 1989. ISBN 9788200127871
- Ventetiden. Universitetsforlaget 1996. ISBN 9788200225966
- Kunsten å være foreldre. 2. opplag. Fagbokforlaget 2004. ISBN 9788276747829
- Psykopat? Historier fra virkeligheten. 2. opplag. Fagbokforlaget 2008. ISBN 9788245005875
- Mot. Psykologi i hverdagen. Fagbokforlaget 2010. ISBN 9788245008807
- Om bevissthet. Psykologi. Mindfulness. Science fiction. Nær-døden-erfaringer. Kosmisk bevissthet. Fagbokforlaget 2011. ISBN 9788245011050

=== Novels ===
- Mannen fra Ur. Abrahams reise fra Ur til Det hellige land. Solum forlag 2001. ISBN 9788256013227

=== E-Books ===
- Hva er empatisk Kommunikasjon? 8 essay med eksempler på implementering og bruk av Empatisk Kommunikasjon på tvers av områder, som ledelse, pasient arbeid, rådgivning, veiledning og i vår hverdag. Håndboken er et supplement til læreboken Empatisk Kommunikasjon. Et verktøy for menneskemøter. 2016.
