= Anton Holter =

Anton Martinius Holter (1831-1921) was a Montana pioneer, businessman and politician. He made his fortune in lumber, farming, real estate and hardware.

He emigrated from his native Norway, arriving in the United States in 1854. He first worked as a carpenter in Iowa and Minnesota, before building his first sawmill near Virginia City, Montana. Holter established lumber yards in several other Montana towns, including Helena, Great Falls, and Nevada City, among others. In Helena, he founded several general merchandise and hardware companies, including A.M. Holter Hardware Company, which remained in business until 1958. Holter also served on Montana's first territorial council and first legislature, as well as Helena's first school board.

The Holter family remained active in Montana public affairs for many years and the family name is featured prominently in Montana, and especially within Helena, on places, institutions and landmarks, including the Holter Museum of Art, Holter Lake, Holter Dam and Holter Street. The World War II Liberty ship SS Anton Holter was named in his honor.
