= Sampson Sladen =

Royal Navy officer and firefighter (1868–1940)

Lieutenant-Commander Sir Sampson Sladen KBE
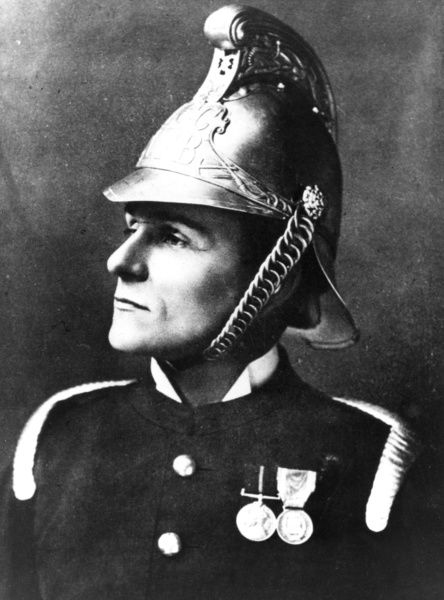

Chief Officer of the London Fire Brigade
- In office 1909–1918
- Preceded by: James de Courcy Hamilton
- Succeeded by: Arthur Reginald Dyer

Lieutenant-Commander Sir Sampson Sladen, KBE (14 December 1868 – 6 July 1940) was a Royal Navy officer and firefighter. He was Chief Officer of the London Fire Brigade from 1909 to 1918.

The youngest son of Colonel Joseph Sladen, Sampson Sladen entered the Royal Navy in 1882 and was promoted to lieutenant in 1892. He resigned his commission in 1899 on being selected for appointment to the London Fire Brigade. He was appointed third officer of the brigade on January 31, 1899. By 1903, the whole county north of the River Thames, except for the central district, was placed under his direct charge. His naval commission was restored in 1904 when he volunteered to serve in case of war or emergency. He was promoted to lieutenant-commander in 1914.

On his retirement from the London Fire Brigade, he became technical adviser to the Ministry of Munitions from 1919 to 1920 and Transport Commissioner (London) at the Ministry of Transport from 1920 to 1921. He was a member of the Royal Commission on Fire Prevention from 1921 to 1923. He was appointed KBE in 1920. He died at Douglas, Isle of Man, in 1940.

Sladen married Fanny Harriet Boys (died 1919), daughter of Lieutenant G. S. Boys, RN, in 1896.
