= Wallington =

Wallington may refer to:

== Places ==
=== Australia ===
- Wallington, Victoria

=== United Kingdom ===
- Wallington, Hampshire
- Wallington, Hertfordshire
- Wallington, London, a town in the London Borough of Sutton
- Wallington, Northumberland, a National Trust restored country manor in North East England.
- Wallingtons, a manor house in Kintbury, Berkshire, now the St Cassian's Centre
- River Wallington, Hampshire

=== United States ===
- Wallington, New Jersey
- Wallington, New York

== People ==
- Wallington (surname)

== See also ==
- Wallington Hall, a country house in Northumberland, England
- Wallington High School
- Wallington High School for Girls
- Wallington Demesne, Northumberland
