= London Fire Brigade =

Fire and rescue service for London

Coordinates: 51°30′12″N 0°05′55″W

Operational area
- Country: England
- City: London
- Address: Union Street, SE1

Agency overview
- Established: 1833; 193 years ago
- Employees: 5,992
- Annual budget: £389.2 million (2014–2015)
- Commissioner: Jonathan Smith

Facilities and equipment
- Divisions: 5
- Stations: 102 plus 1 river station
- Engines: 155
- USAR: 14
- Fireboats: 2

Website
- london-fire.gov.uk

The London Fire Brigade (LFB) is the fire and rescue service for London, the capital of the United Kingdom. It was formed by the Metropolitan Fire Brigade Act 1865 (28 & 29 Vict. c. 90), under the leadership of superintendent Eyre Massey Shaw. It has 5,992 staff, including 5,096 operational firefighters and officers based at 102 fire stations (plus one river station).

The LFB is led by the Commissioner for Fire and Emergency Planning, a position currently held by Jonathan Smith. The brigade and Commissioner are overseen by the Greater London Authority, which in 2018 took over these responsibilities from the London Fire and Emergency Planning Authority (LFEPA).

In the 2015–16 financial year, the LFB received 171,488 emergency calls. These consisted of 20,773 fires, 48,696 false alarms of fire and 30,066 other calls for service. As well as firefighting, the LFB also responds to road traffic collisions, floods, shut-in-lift releases, and other incidents such as those involving hazardous materials or major transport accidents. It also conducts emergency planning and performs fire safety inspections and education. It does not provide an emergency medical service as this function is performed by the London Ambulance Service, an independent organisation, although all LFB firefighters are trained in first aid and all of its fire engines carry first aid equipment. Since 2016, the LFB has provided first aid for some life-threatening medical emergencies (e.g., cardiac arrest and respiratory arrest).

== History ==
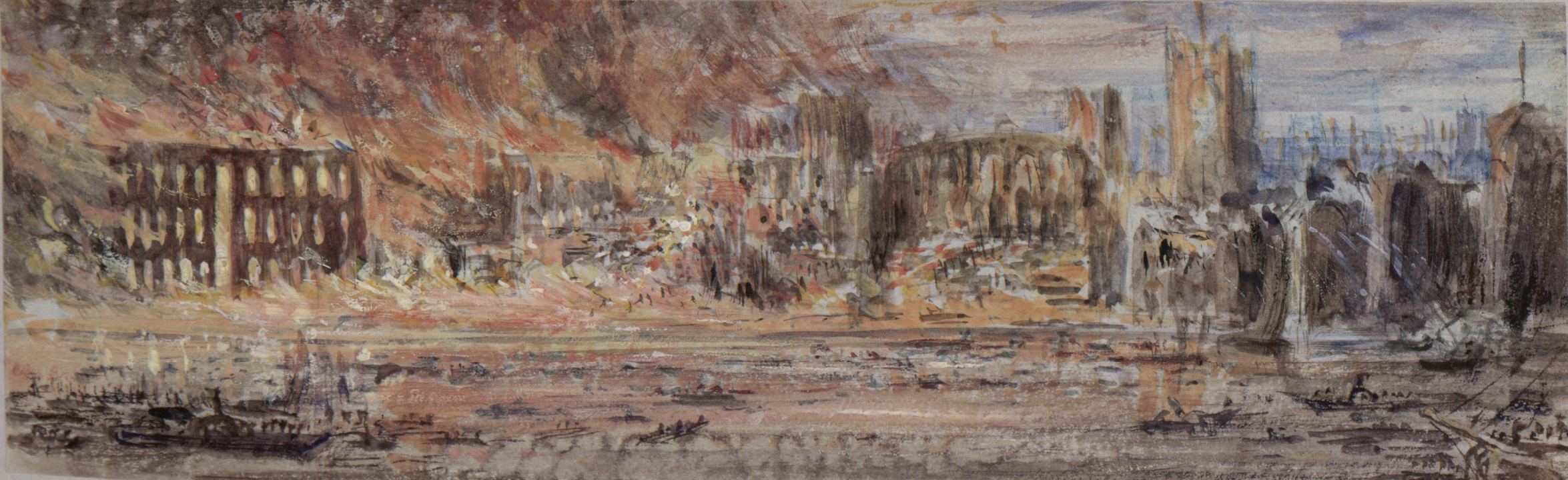
The 1861 Tooley Street fire from Billingsgate

Following a multitude of ad-hoc firefighting arrangements and the Great Fire of London, various insurance companies established firefighting units to tackle fires that occurred in buildings that their respective companies insured. As demands grew on the primitive firefighting units they began to coordinate and co-operate with each other until, on 1 January 1833, the London Fire Engine Establishment was formed under the leadership of James Braidwood, who had founded the first professional, municipal fire brigade in Edinburgh. He introduced a uniform that, for the first time, included personal protection from the hazards of firefighting. With 80 firefighters and 13 fire stations, the unit was still a private enterprise, funded by the insurance companies and as such was responsible mainly for saving material goods from fire.

Metropolitan Fire Brigade Act 1865 (Note: Section 1.)
- Act of Parliament
- Parliament of the United Kingdom
- Long title: An Act for the Establishment of a Fire Brigade within the Metropolis.
- Citation: 28 & 29 Vict. c. 90
- Territorial extent: United Kingdom

Dates
- Royal assent: 5 July 1865
- Commencement: 1 January 1866 (Note: Section 4.)
Other legislation
Amends	Fires Prevention (Metropolis) Act 1774; Lighting and Watching Act 1833
Amended by	Statute Law Revision Act 1875; Interpretation Act 1889; Fire Services Act 1947; London Government Act 1963; Criminal Justice Act 1982

Status: Amended

Text of statute as originally enacted

Text of the Metropolitan Fire Brigade Act 1865 as in force today (including any amendments) within the United Kingdom, from legislation.gov.uk.

Several large fires, most notably at the Palace of Westminster in 1834 and the 1861 Tooley Street fire (in which Braidwood died in action, aged 61), spurred the insurance companies to lobby the British government to provide the brigade at public expense and management. After due consideration, the Metropolitan Fire Brigade Act 1865 (28 & 29 Vict. c. 90) was passed, creating the Metropolitan Fire Brigade under the leadership of Eyre Massey Shaw, a former head of police and fire services in Belfast. It was overseen by the Metropolitan Board of Works, a precursor to county government in London. In 1904 the MFB was renamed as the London Fire Brigade. Photographs of some of the early firefighters are held in the collections of the LFB Museum, rediscovered in 2026. The LFB moved into a new headquarters built by Higgs and Hill on the Albert Embankment in Lambeth in 1937, where it remained until 2007.

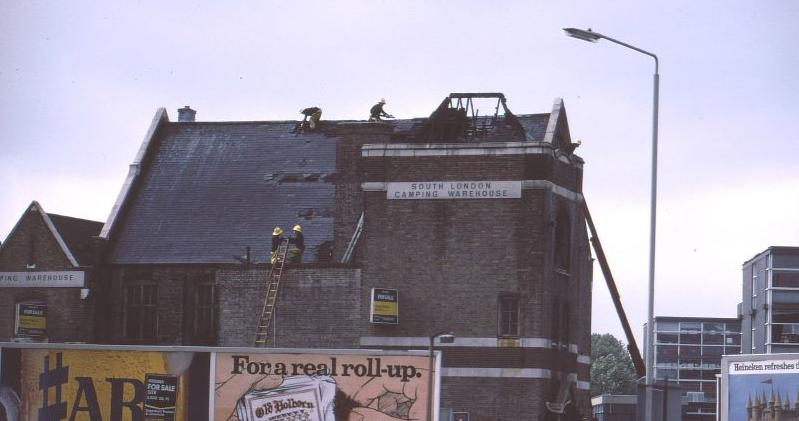
LFB firefighters at a warehouse in south London after a major fire in 1980

During the Second World War the country's brigades were amalgamated into a single National Fire Service. The separate London Fire Brigade for the County of London was re-established in 1948. With the formation of Greater London in 1965, this absorbed most of the Middlesex Fire Brigade, the borough brigades for West Ham, East Ham and Croydon and parts of the Essex, Hertfordshire, Surrey and Kent brigades.

In 1986 the Greater London Council (GLC) was disbanded and a new statutory authority, the London Fire and Civil Defence Authority (LFCDA), was formed to take responsibility for the LFB. The LFCDA was replaced in 2000 by the London Fire and Emergency Planning Authority. At the same time, the Greater London Authority (GLA) was established to administer the LFEPA and coordinate emergency planning for London. Consisting of the Mayor of London and other elected members, the GLA also takes responsibility for the Metropolitan Police Service, Transport for London and other functions.

In 2007, the LFB vacated its Lambeth headquarters and moved to a site in Union Street, Southwark. In the same year, the Department for Communities and Local Government announced that LFB Commissioner Ken Knight had been appointed as the first Chief Fire and Rescue Adviser to the government. Knight was succeeded as Commissioner at that time by Ron Dobson, who served for almost ten years. Dany Cotton took over in 2017, becoming the brigade's first female commissioner.

In December 2022, the brigade was put into special measures with an enhanced level of monitoring after an independent review highlighted incidents of misogyny and racism.

Badges of the London Fire Brigade

1936-1938

1948-1965

1965-1986

1986-present

=== Commissioners and chief officers ===
As of 1 June 2025, Jonathan Smith is the commissioner of the LFB. He succeeds Andy Roe, who succeeded Dany Cotton, who in 2017 had become the first woman to hold the top role; Cotton resigned in the wake of the Grenfell Tower fire after 32 years' service in the brigade. Prior to Cotton, Ron Dobson was the commissioner and he had served in the LFB since 1979; he was appointed CBE for his distinguished contribution to the fire service.

- 1833–1861: James Braidwood (director of the London Fire Engine Establishment, died in action)
- 1861–1891: Capt Eyre Massey Shaw (superintendent, later chief officer)
- 1891–1896: James Sexton Simmonds
- 1896–1903: Capt Lionel de Lautour Wells
- 1903–1909: RAdm James de Courcy Hamilton
- 1909–1918: Lt Cdr Sir Sampson Sladen
- 1918–1933: Arthur Reginald Dyer
- 1933–1938: Maj Cyril Morris
- 1938–1941: Cdr Sir Aylmer Firebrace
- 1939–1941: Maj Frank Jackson
- 1941–1948: all fire brigades nationalised
- 1948–1962: Sir Frederick Delve
- 1962–1970: Leslie Leete
- 1970–1976: Joseph Milner
- 1976–1980: Peter Darby
- 1980–1987: Ronald Bullers
- 1987–1991: Gerald Clarkson
- 1991–2003: Brian Robinson (first commissioner)
- 2003–2007: Sir Ken Knight
- 2007–2016: Ron Dobson
- 2017–2019: Dany Cotton
- 2020–2025: Andy Roe
- 2025–current: Jonathan Smith

== Organisation ==
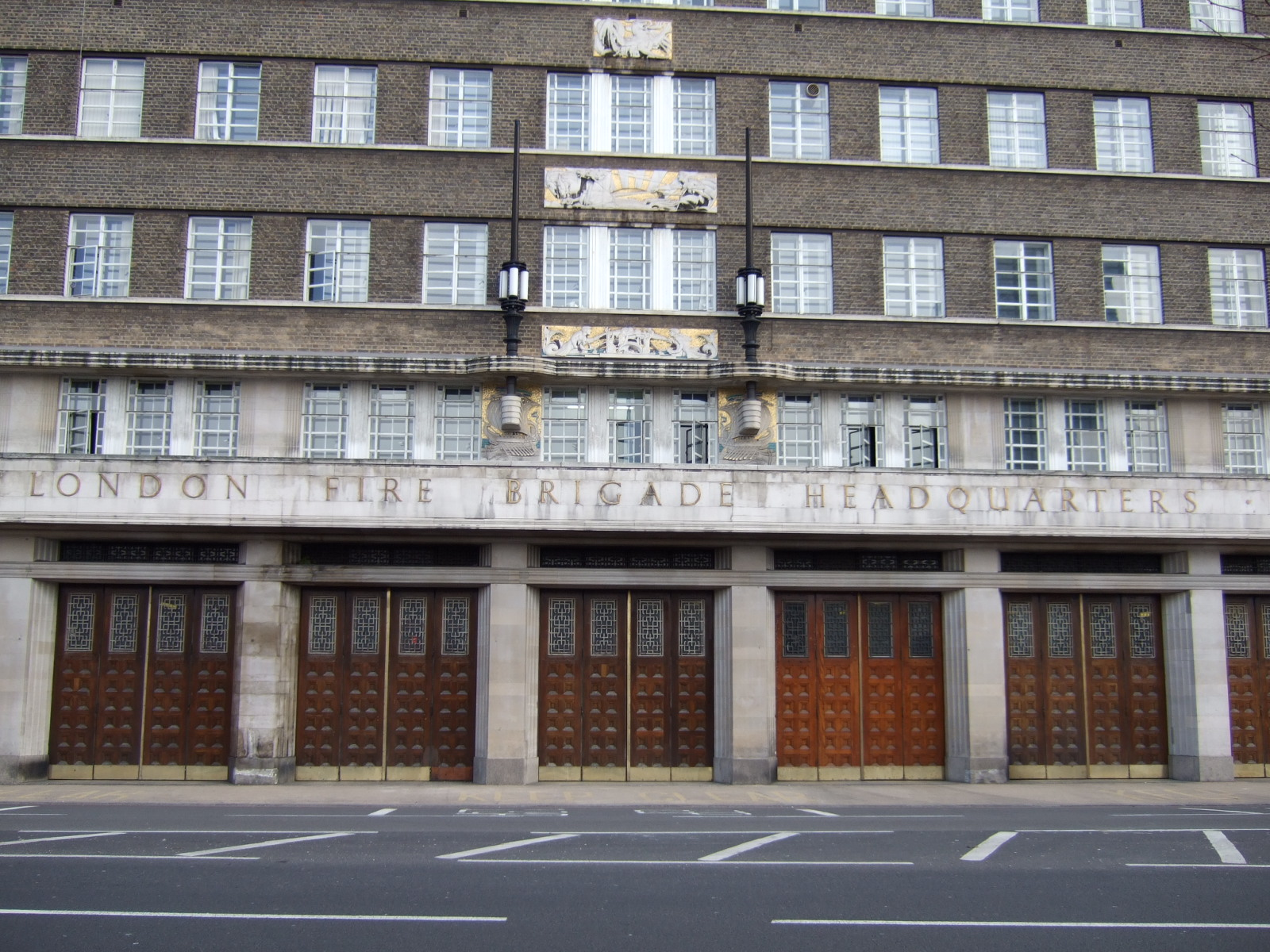
Lambeth Fire Station, London Fire Brigade headquarters from 1937 to 2007

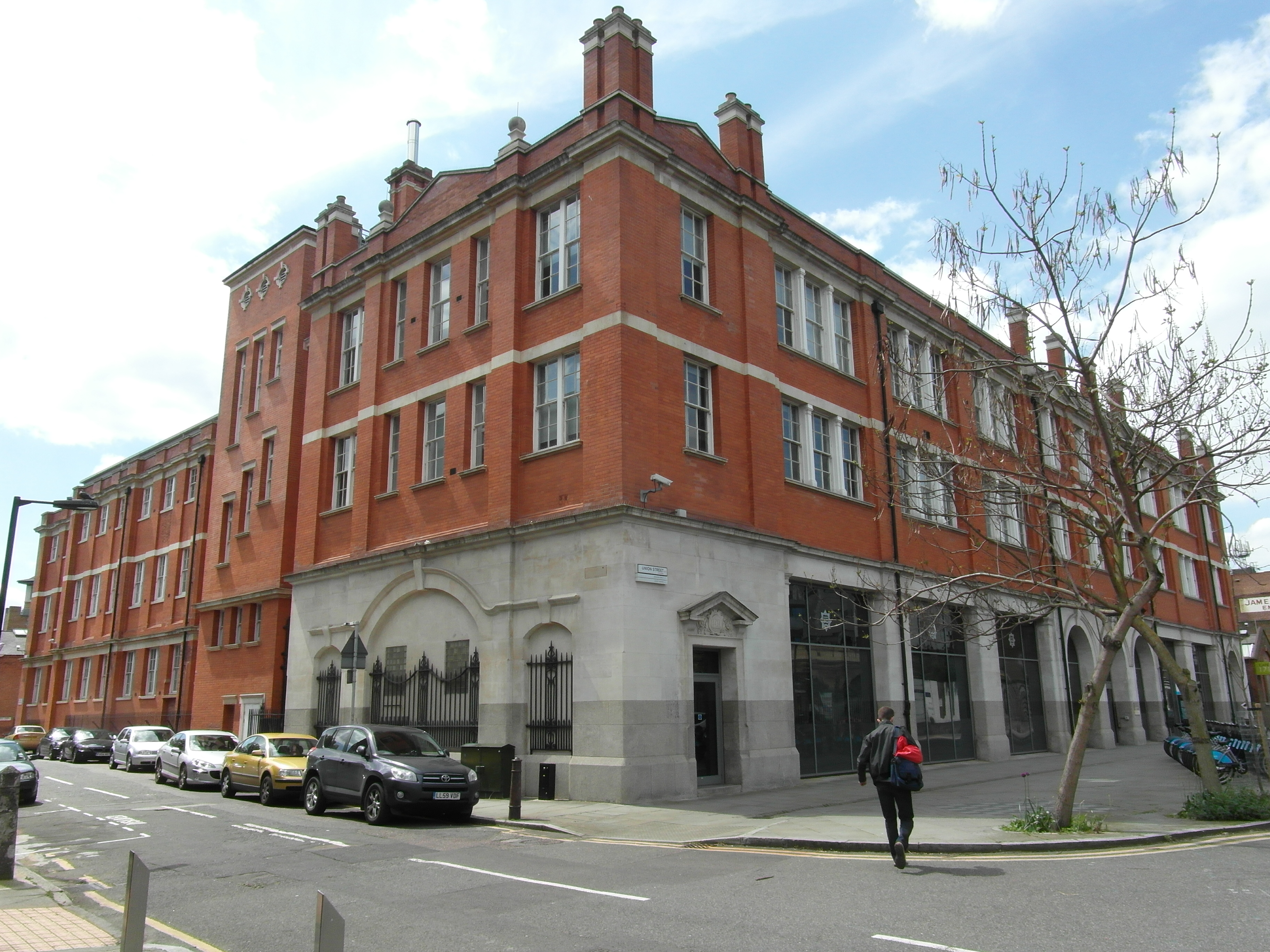
The LFB's current headquarters since 2007, in Southwark

Historically, the London Fire Brigade was organised into two divisions, Northern and Southern, divided in most places by the River Thames and each commanded by a divisional officer. Both divisions were divided into three districts, each under a superintendent with his headquarters at a "superintendent station". The superintendent stations themselves were commanded by district officers, with the other stations under station officers.

On the creation of the Greater London Council in 1965, the brigade was enlarged and took over almost all of the Middlesex Fire Brigade, part of west Kent, North Surrey, south Hertfordshire, and South West Essex, together with the small County Borough brigades of Croydon, East Ham and West Ham.

The internal LFB organisation consists of three directorates that all report to the commissioner. They are:

- Operations;
- Safety and Assurance; and
- Finance and Contractual Services.

The LFB's headquarters since 2007 is located in Union Street in Southwark, adjacent to the brigade's former training centre, which was both the original headquarters of the Massey Shaw fire brigade and his home, Winchester House, as well as the London Fire Brigade Museum. The brigade was previously headquartered in Lambeth between 1937 and 2007.

== Performance ==
Every fire and rescue service in England and Wales is periodically subjected to a statutory inspection by His Majesty's Inspectorate of Constabulary and Fire & Rescue Services (HMICFRS, colloquially known as “Himickfurrs”). The inspections investigate how well the service performs in each of three areas. On a scale of outstanding, good, requires improvement and inadequate, London Fire Brigade was rated as follows:

HMICFRS Inspection London
Area	Rating 2018–2019	Rating 2021–2022	Description
Effectiveness	Requires improvement	Requires improvement	How effective is the fire and rescue service at keeping people safe and secure from fire and other risks?
Efficiency	Requires improvement	Requires improvement	How efficient is the fire and rescue service at keeping people safe and secure from fire and other risks?
People	Requires improvement	Requires improvement	How well does the fire and rescue service look after its people?

== Legislative powers ==
Fire and rescue authorities in England come under the government department formerly known as the Office of the Deputy Prime Minister (ODPM). This department was responsible for legislation covering fire authorities; however, in 2006, a structural change to central government led to the creation of the Department for Communities and Local Government (DCLG), and subsequently the Ministry of Housing, Communities and Local Government (MHCLG). It is now responsible for fire and resilience in England, including London.

The Fire and Rescue Services Act 2004 changed many working practices; it was brought in to replace the Fire Services Act 1947 and repealed several existing acts, many going back fifty years. The full list of acts repealed can be found here:

The 2004 Act was drafted in response to the Independent Review of the Fire Service, often referred to as the Bain Report, after its author Professor Sir George Bain. It recommended radical changes to many working procedures and led to a national firefighter strike in 2002–2003.

Further changes to the legislative, organisational and structural fabric of the brigade, which could include varying the attendance time, the location of frontline appliances and number of personnel, plus mandatory performance targets, priorities and objectives are set by the MHCLG in the form of a document called the Fire and Rescue Service National Framework. The framework is set annually by the government and applies to all brigades in England. Responsibility for the rest of the UK fire service is devolved to the various parliaments and assemblies. On country-wide issues, the Chief Fire Officers Association provides the collective voice on fire, rescue and resilience issues. Membership is made up from senior officers above the rank of Assistant Chief Officer, to Chief Fire Officer (or the new title of Brigade Manager).

== Staffing ==
=== Rank structure ===
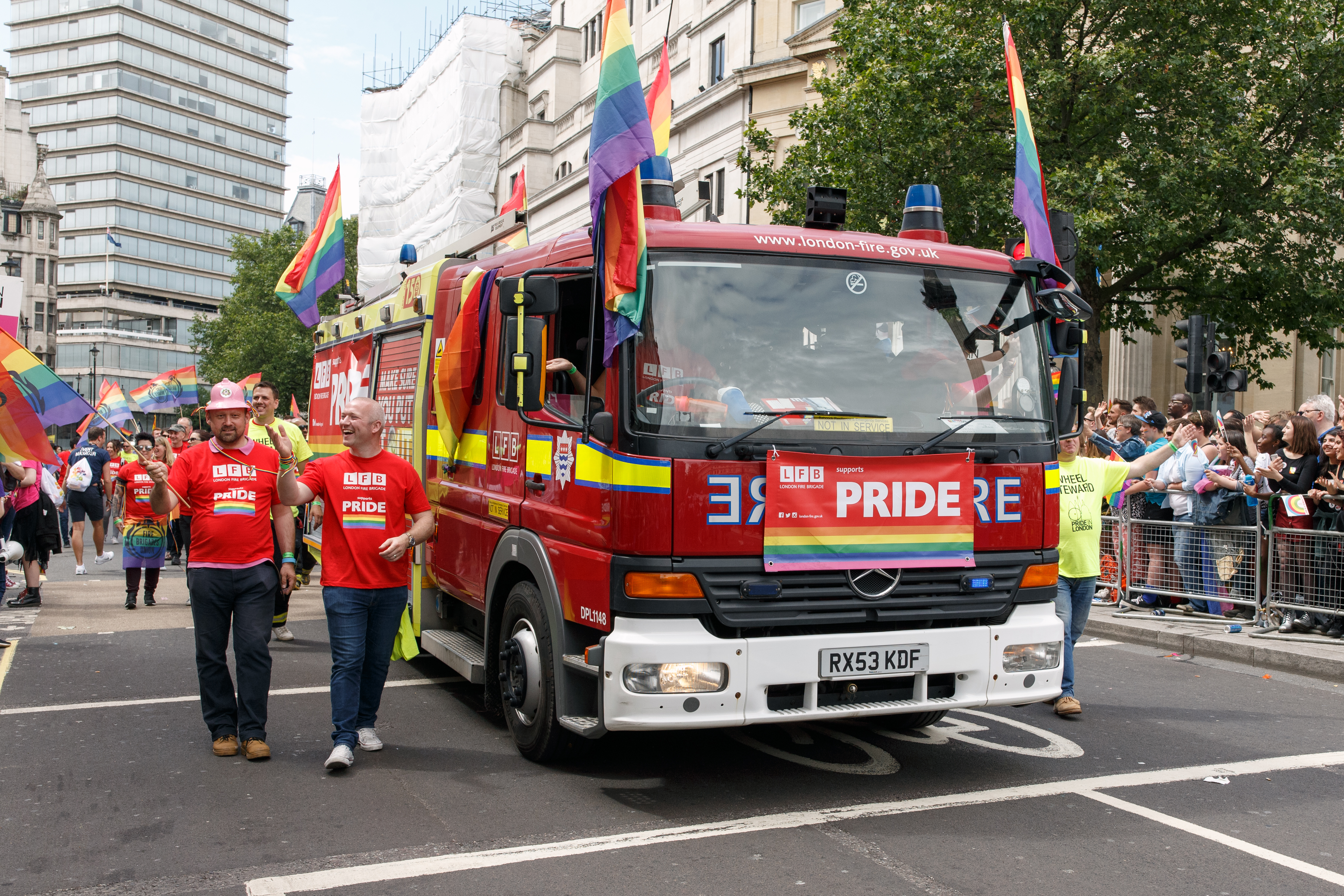
Staff of the London Fire Brigade as part of the Pride in London 2016 parade

London Fire Brigade, along with many UK fire and rescue services, adopted a change in rank structure in 2006. The traditional ranks were replaced with new titles descriptive of the job function.

On 17 October 2019, London Fire Brigade announced a return to the traditional rank titles, in a policy named "Role to Rank". The rank structure of the Brigade is now as follows:

Title	Commissioner	Deputy Commissioner	Assistant Commissioner	Deputy Assistant Commissioner	Group Commander (Borough Commander)	Station Commander	Station Officer	Sub-Officer	Leading Firefighter	Firefighter
Insignia										

=== Recruitment and training ===
In the last 24 months, the LFB have run three firefighter recruitment campaigns; however, in previous years they have seen fewer or even none. There are many factors why they would run a recruitment drive, as there is actually no set recruitment drive for firefighters. Professional firefighter training usually takes place at various London venues. On successful completion, the newly qualified firefighter is posted to a fire station to work on a shift pattern – currently two day shifts (ten and half hours), followed by two night shifts (thirteen and half hours), followed by four days off. Working patterns were the subject of scrutiny in Professor Bain's Independent Review of the Fire Service.

After training school, firefighters serve a one-year period of probation; qualification and full pay are not reached until the candidate completes a development folder which usually takes around 12–18 months. Ongoing training – both theoretical and practical – continues throughout the firefighter's career.

=== Shift pattern ===
In December 2010 the LFB and Fire Brigades Union (FBU) agreed on a new shift pattern for front-line firefighters: two 10½-hour day shifts then two 13½-hour night shifts followed by four days off.

The agreement followed two 8-hour daytime strikes by the FBU in protest at the LFB's intention to change the shift pattern from two 9-hour day shifts then two 15-hour night shifts followed by three days off, to two 12-hour day shifts then two 12-hour night shifts followed by four days off.

A London Fire Brigade report published in March 2012 stated that the shift changes have improved safety in the city. Compared with the 12 months prior to the shift changes, the 12 months following them saw firefighters able to spend more time on training, community safety work, and home safety visits (including the free fitting of smoke alarms).

=== Promotion ===
Firefighters must go through an assessment centre and reach the required standard set out by the Brigade in order to gain promotion. This process will be followed for each subsequent role the individual applies for, up to and including Assistant Commissioner. Appointments above the role of Assistant Commissioner are overseen by elected members of The London Fire and Emergency Planning Authority.

Some promotion exams can be substituted by qualifications from the Institution of Fire Engineers. Firefighters and civilians such as building inspectors, scientists, surveyors and other practising professionals, take these qualifications either by written test or research.

Future promotion exams will be set using the Integrated Personal Development System (IPDS).

== Firefighting, special services and fire prevention ==
In 2010–2011, the LFB handled a total of 212,657 emergency calls, including 5,241 hoax calls (although it only mobilised to 2,248 of those malicious false alarms). During the same period, it dealt with 13,367 major fires. There were 6,731 dwelling fires, including 748 that had been started deliberately; 73 people died in 58 fatal fires.

In addition to conflagrations, LFB firefighters respond to "special services".

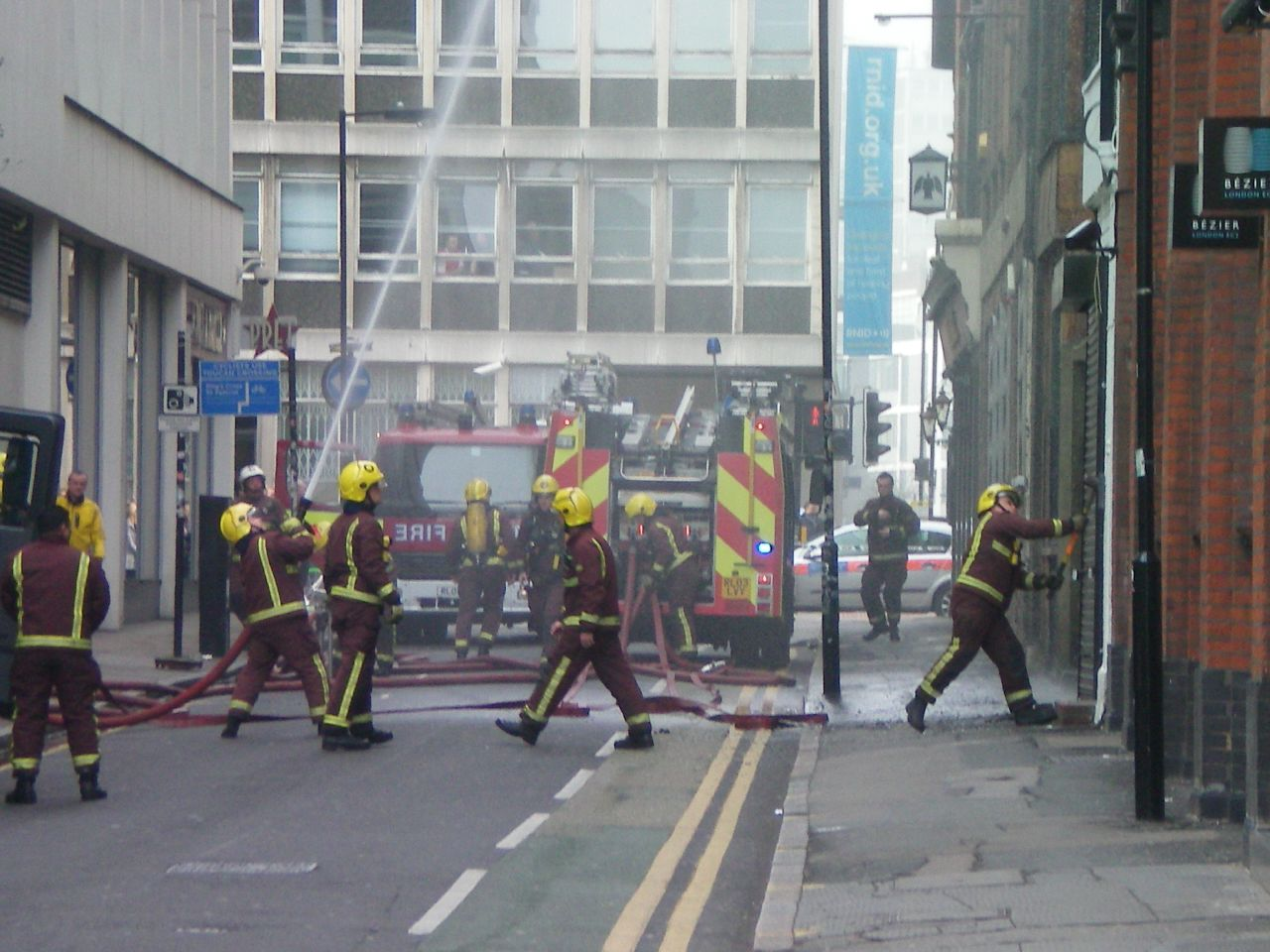
LFB firefighters at a building fire; one uses an axe (right) to gain entry.

A special service is defined as every other non-fire related emergency, such as:

Category	Number of incidents in 2010–11
Lift releases	9,395
Effecting entry/exit	7,276
Flooding	6,956
Traffic collisions	3,604
Spills and leaks	1,479
Assisting other agencies	855
"Making safe" operations	782
Animal rescues	583
Hazardous materials incidents	353
General evacuations	322
Suicides or attempts	229
Waterborne rescues	38

The full scope of the brigade's duties and powers is enshrined in the Fire and Rescue Act 2005.

Firefighters and, in some cases, specialist teams from the brigade's fire investigation unit, based at Dowgate in the City of London, also investigate arson incidents, often working alongside the police and providing evidence in court. In 2008–2009, deliberate fires accounted for 28% of all those attended by the LFB, a 28% reduction on the previous year.

The other core duty of the brigade is to "prevent damage", and day-to-day fire prevention duties.

=== Firefighting cover ===
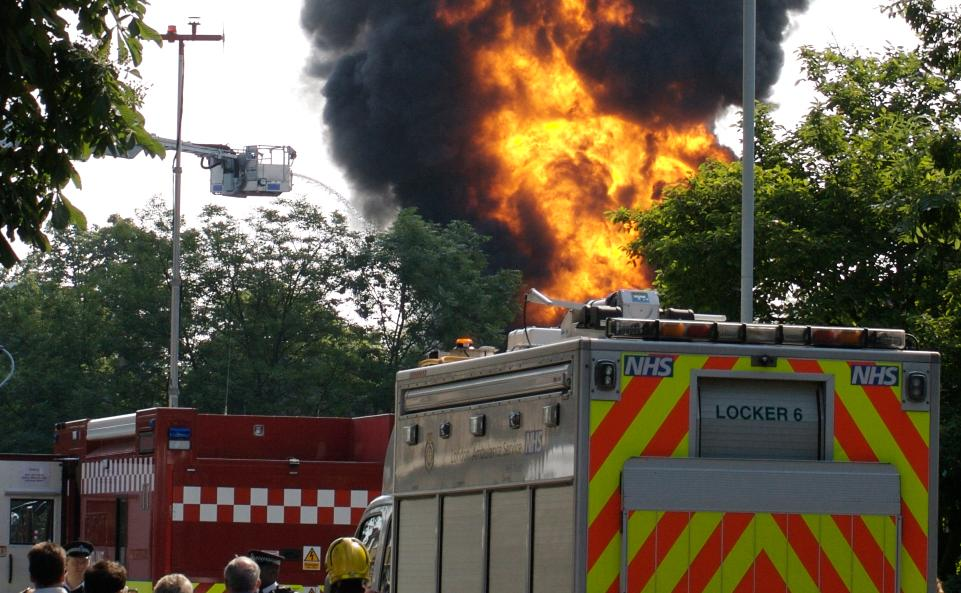
The LFB tackles a fire at an electrical substation in Sydenham.

The LFB provides fire cover according to a system of four risk categories which have historically been used across the UK, where every building is rated for its risk on a scale from "A" down to "D". The risk category determines the minimum number of appliances to be sent in a pre-determined mobilisation.

Category	Areas covered	Minimum response
A	Areas with a high density of large buildings and/or population, such as offices or factories.	Three fire engines are to arrive within eight minutes, the first two within five minutes.
B	Areas with a medium density of large buildings and/or population, such as multi-storey residential blocks	Two fire engines will be deployed, with one to arrive within five minutes and the second within eight minutes.
C	Lower density, suburban areas and detached properties	One fire engine should arrive within 10 minutes.
D	More rural areas	One fire engine should arrive within 20 minutes.

=== Response times ===
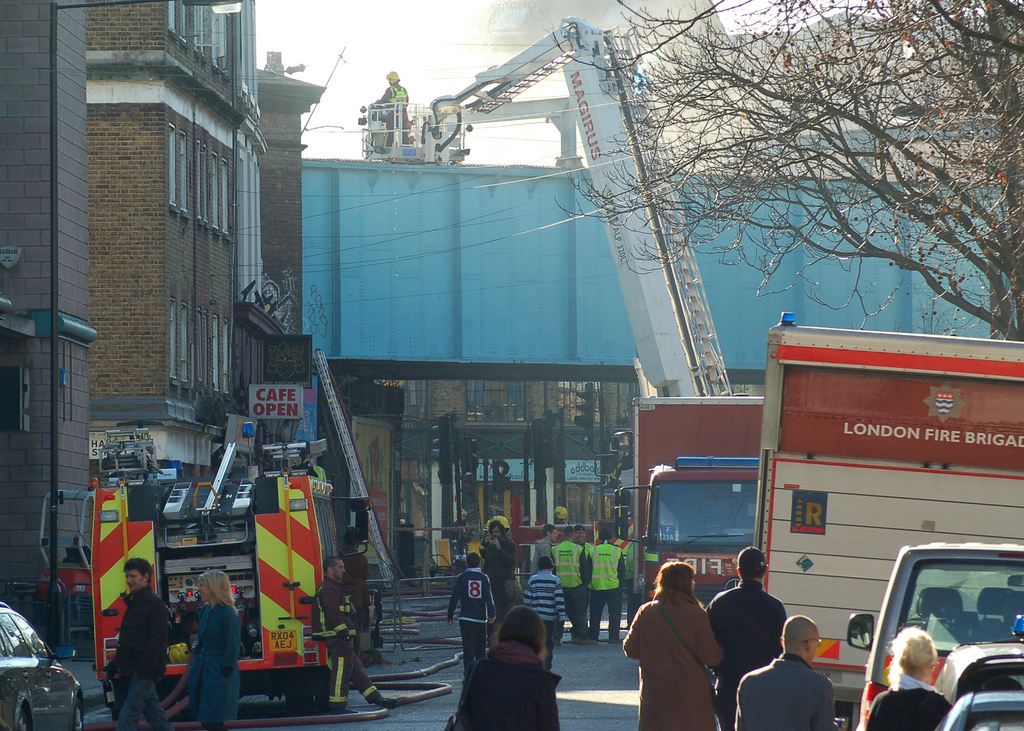
Damping down using an aerial ladder platform after a fire in Camden

In 2007–2008, the first fire engine mobilised to a 999 call arrived within five minutes 58.8% of the time, and within eight minutes 90% of the time. The second fire engine deployed arrived within eight minutes 81.9% of the time, and within ten minutes 92.4% of the time.

In 2010–2011, the average response time of the first appliance to the scene was 5 minutes 34 seconds (6 minute target), and the second appliance was 6 minutes 53 seconds (8 minute target).

In 2015–2016, the average response time for the first appliance to the scene was 5 minutes 33 seconds (6 minute target), and the second appliance to the scene was 6 minutes 55 seconds (8 minute target).

==== Mutual assistance ====
The Fire and Rescue Services Act 2004 gives the UK fire services the ability to call upon other services or fire authorities in what is known as mutual assistance. For example, the LFB played a comprehensive role in assisting Hertfordshire Fire and Rescue Service at the Buncefield fire in 2005. Much earlier, the Hampton Court fire of 1986, which was on the border with Surrey, was attended by both the LFB and Surrey Fire and Rescue Service.

In 2015–2016, the LFB assisted at 567 "over the border" incidents.

The other fire services that adjoin the LFB area are (in clockwise order around London):

- Essex County Fire and Rescue Service
- Kent Fire and Rescue Service
- Surrey Fire and Rescue Service
- Royal Berkshire Fire and Rescue Service
- Buckinghamshire Fire and Rescue Service
- Hertfordshire Fire and Rescue Service

The LFB also mobilises to support airport firefighters at London Heathrow Airport, London City Airport and The London Heliport.

=== Determining the size of an incident ===
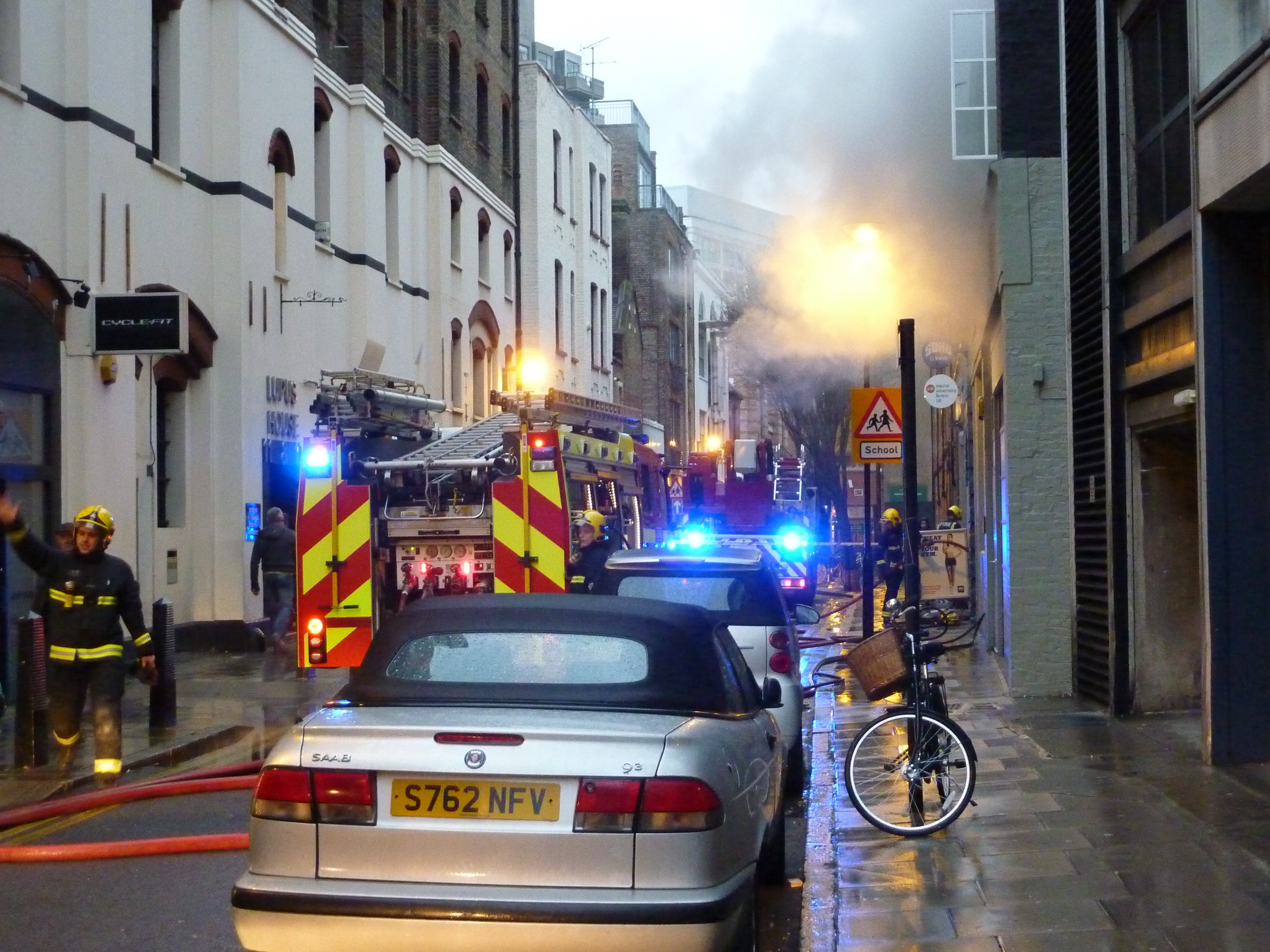
London Fire Brigade attending an incident in St. Giles in December 2011

The LFB, along with all other UK fire and rescue services, determines the size of a fire or special service by the final number of appliances mobilised to deal with it. For example, two appliances are despatched to a "B" risk area in response to a fire call in a residential house. The officer-in-charge can request additional appliances by transmitting a radio message such as, "make pumps four", or if persons are believed to be involved or trapped, "make pumps four, persons reported". The control room will then deploy a further two appliances making a total of four. Informally, firefighters refer to such fires as "a make up" or "a four-pumper"; when the fire is out, if no other pumping appliances were despatched, this would be recorded as a 'four-pump fire'.

If an incident is more serious, it can be escalated straight to a six-, eight- or ten-pump fire and beyond – in London this is usually completed in even numbers, though it is not uncommon for a ten-pump fire to be "made up" to 15 if necessary. A call to, say, a large warehouse ablaze could be escalated straight to a ten-pump fire. The 2007 Cutty Sark fire required eight pumps; as a serious incident escalates, the brigade deploys senior officers, Command Units and any specialist appliances required.

Examples of 25-pump fires include the blaze at Alexandra Palace in 1980, and at the Royal Marsden Hospital, Chelsea in 2008, the latter also involving four aerial appliances. The King's Cross fire in 1987 was a 30-pump fire, as was the blaze in numerous shops on Oxford Street in April 2007. The Grenfell Tower fire in June 2017 was a 40-pump fire, the first since 1972.

Pumping appliances can only operate with a minimum crew of four, and a maximum of six (although this is rare) so it is possible to estimate the number of firefighters attending an incident by multiplying the number of pumps by five. For example, the Cutty Sark fire was described as "an eight-pump fire attended by 40 firefighters".

=== Special services ===
Core services are paid for by London's council tax payers and through central government funding known as a grant settlement; each council tax payer's bill will include a precept – a specific part of their bill that contributes to the funding of the fire brigade. Those in need of the LFB's services in an emergency do not pay, but the brigade can provide additional special services for which it may charge where there is no immediate threat to life or imminent risk of injury.

Examples of these special services which may be charged for include the clearing of flooded commercial premises, the use of brigade equipment for supplying or removing water, and making structures safe in cases where there is no risk of personal injury to the public.

=== Safety and fire prevention ===
LFB firefighters and watch officers often visit residential and commercial premises to advise on hazard risk assessment and fire prevention. They also provide safety education to schools and youth groups. Each of the London boroughs has a central fire safety office that collates and coordinates fire prevention work in accordance with legislation, and they are supported by a dedicated team of specialist officers.

In 2010–2011, the LFB made 70,016 home fire safety visits. More than 100,000 children are seen each year by the brigade's schools team. Around half of all serious fires occur in the home, and many house fires attended by the LFB no smoke alarm was fitted, despite the LFB fitting tens of thousands in homes every year.

== Stations and equipment ==
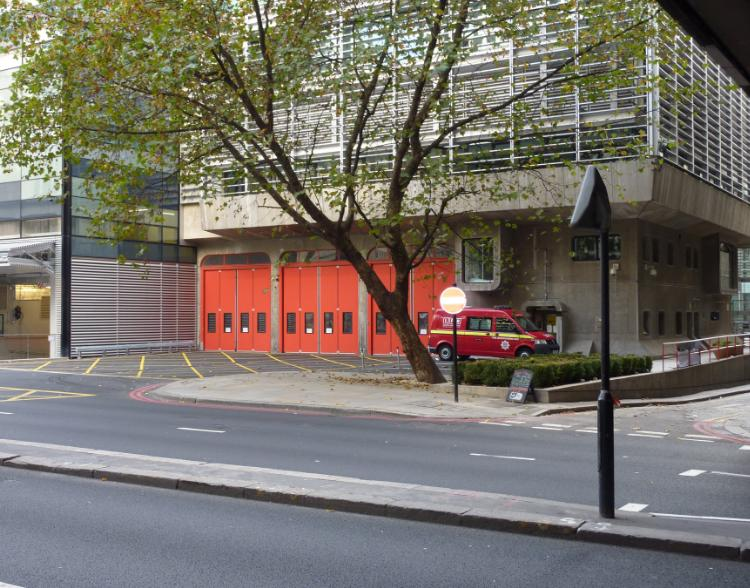
Dowgate fire station in the City of London is home to the fire investigation team.

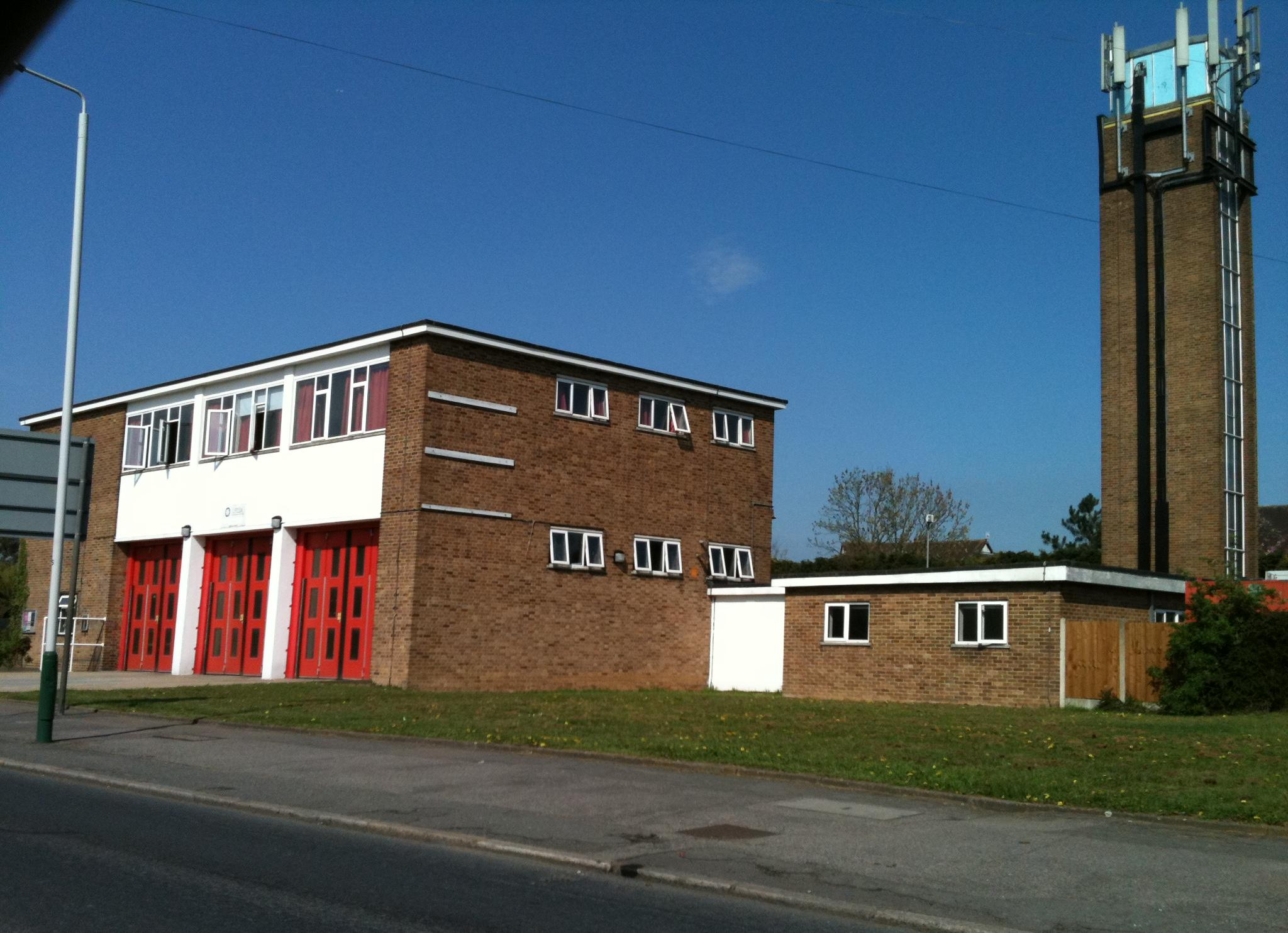
Romford fire station

As of 2014, the LFB has 103 fire stations, including one river station, across the 32 London boroughs and the City of London. They are staffed 24 hours a day by full-time employees of the brigade, and are linked to a control centre in Merton. This centre was opened in 2012; calls to it are fed from 999 operators at BT, Cable & Wireless and Global Crossing.

Central London stations can attend up to 8,000 calls per year, inner-city stations about 3,000 to 4,000 calls per year (these tend to be the stations that are busy serving the densely populated areas), and outlying or suburban fire stations may attend around 1,500 calls which include road traffic accidents, grass fires and house fires.

LFB does not use retained firefighters, who live and work near their local station and are on-call.

Each station has four shifts, or 'watches': red, white, blue and green, with a Sub Officer (single appliance stations) or Station Officer (multi appliance stations) in charge of each. The overall management of the station falls to the Station Commander, who will also attend serious incidents, as well as spending time on call.

A group of one (City of London) to five (Tower Hamlets) stations within a borough are managed by a Borough Commander (Group Commander) who interacts strategically on a local level with the Borough Commander for the police and ambulance services and the chief executive of the local authority.

=== Stations and districts ===
Upon the founding of the Greater London Council in 1965, the new authority was organised into 11 divisions, of roughly 10 to 12 stations each, designated "A" Division through to "L" Division, dispatched by three 999 mobilising control rooms. "A" (West End), "D" (West London), "G" (North West London) and "J" (North London) mobilised from Wembley (the former Middlesex headquarters); "B" (Central London south of the river), "E" (South East London and Kent), "H" (South London and Surrey) and "K" (South West London south of the river and Surrey) mobilised from Croydon (the former Croydon County Borough brigade headquarters); finally, "C" (City and Inner East London), "F" (East London including Docklands) and "L" (North East London and South West Essex), mobilised from Stratford (the former West Ham County Borough headquarters). Each of these divisions were, to a degree, autonomous of each other and had their own divisional management hierarchy. This arrangement lasted until 1989 when the brigade was re-organised into the current arrangement.

The LFB's 102 fire stations are divided into five districts, each designated by a letter of the alphabet: the Northern District Command is designated as "A"; the Southeastern District Command is designated as "E"; the Eastern District Command is designated as "F"; the Western District Command is designated as "G"; the Southwestern District Command is designated as "H".

District	Code	No. of fire stations	London Boroughs covered
Northern	"A" or "Alpha"	17	Barnet, Camden, Enfield, Haringey, Islington, the City of Westminster and the City of London.
Southeastern	"E" or "Echo"	19	Bexley, Bromley, Greenwich, Lewisham, and Southwark.
Eastern	"F" or "Foxtrot"	23	Barking and Dagenham, Hackney, Havering, Newham, Redbridge, Tower Hamlets, and Waltham Forest.
Western	"G" or "Golf"	21	Brent, Ealing, Hammersmith and Fulham, Harrow, Hillingdon, Hounslow, and Kensington and Chelsea.
Southwestern	"H" or "Hotel"	22 (Note 1)	Croydon, Kingston upon Thames, Lambeth, Merton, Richmond upon Thames, Sutton, and Wandsworth.

Note 1: Including the independent River Station, the quarters of the Fireboat.

=== Appliances ===
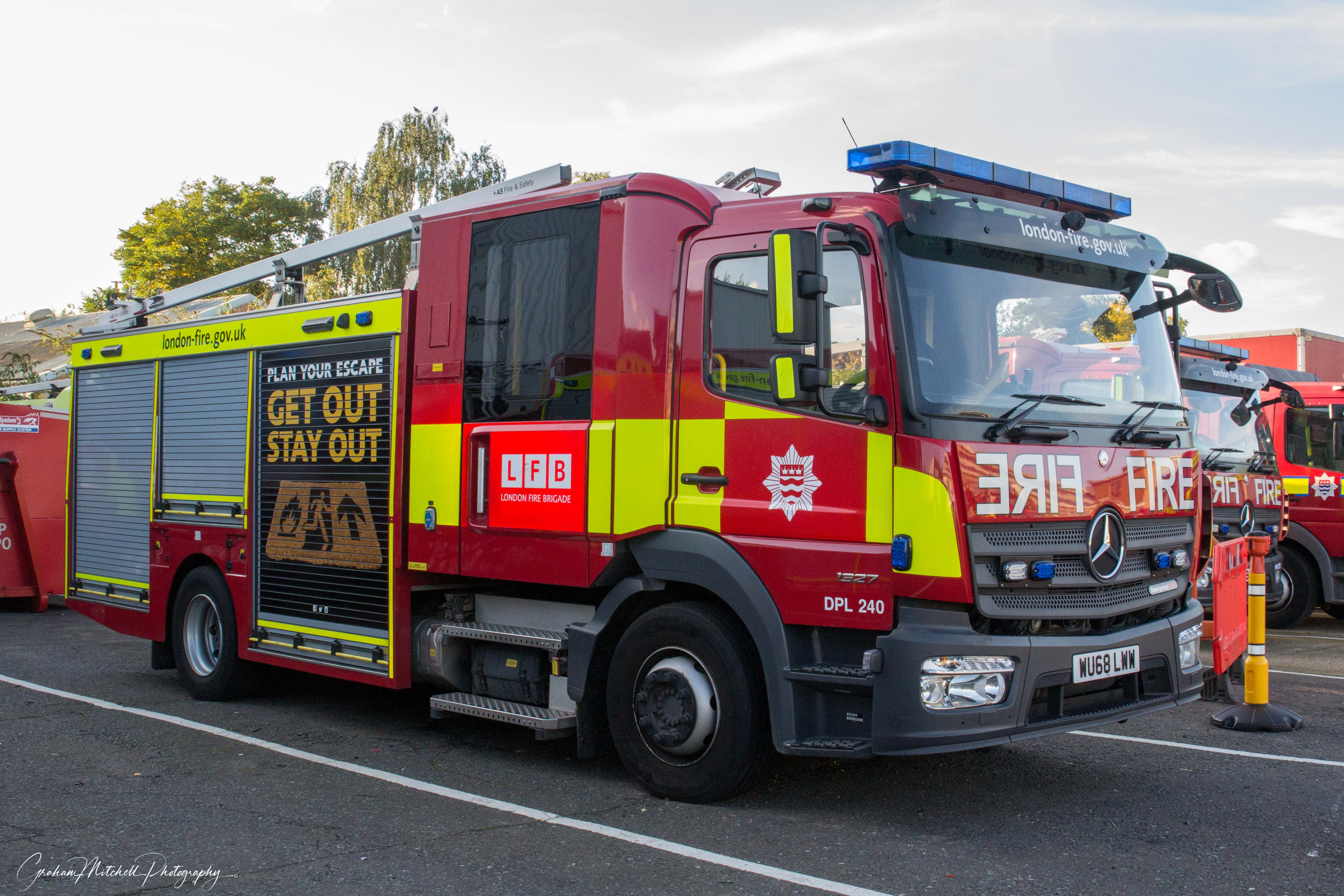
LFB Dual Pump Ladder appliance

All 102 LFB stations (not counting the river station) have a conventional fire appliance known as a 'Pump Ladder'. 40 stations are also assigned one additional appliance, known as a 'Pump'. Numerous other stations are home to a range of other specialist vehicles.

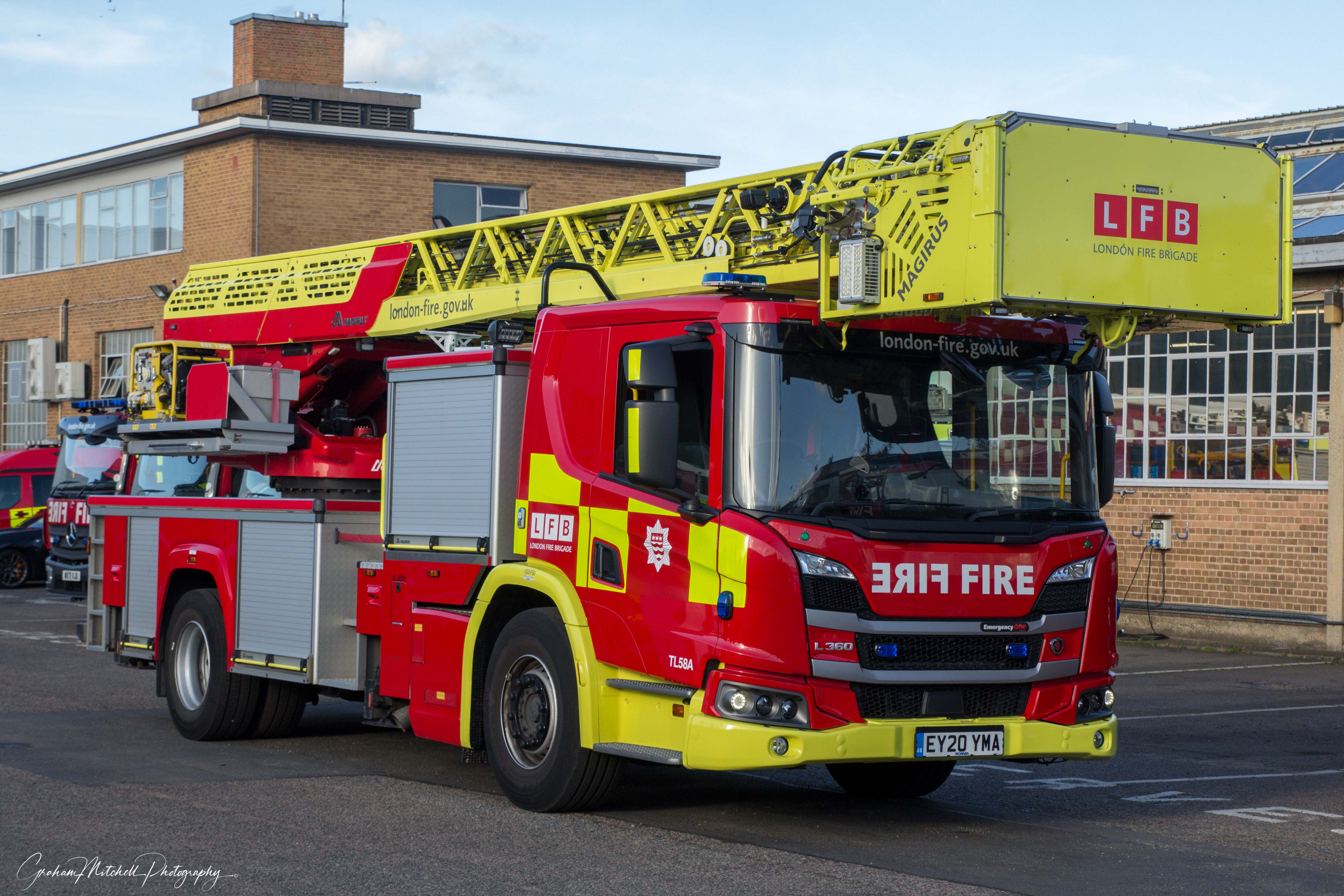
LFB Turntable Ladder appliance

The stations that are assigned both a dual pump ladder and a pump are generally the very busiest stations, stations with a large ground or specific risk. However, the East End of London is known for having lots of very busy stations with just a single appliance, owing to budget cuts. The remaining stations equipped with a single pump ladder generally attend fewer than 2,000 calls per year.

In 2012, the LFB purchased five Mini Countrymans for conversion into instant response vehicles. The two-seat cars are fitted with six extinguishers (two each of water, foam and powder), plus a first-aid kit and defibrillator, and may be deployed to investigate automatic alarms actuating and smaller fires such as those in rubbish bins which do not require a full-sized engine and crew. The brigade has indicated a wish to add more smaller vehicles to its fleet, including crossover utility vehicles which could be fitted with water pumps, breathing apparatus and pull-out equipment drawers, and with enough space for four firefighters.

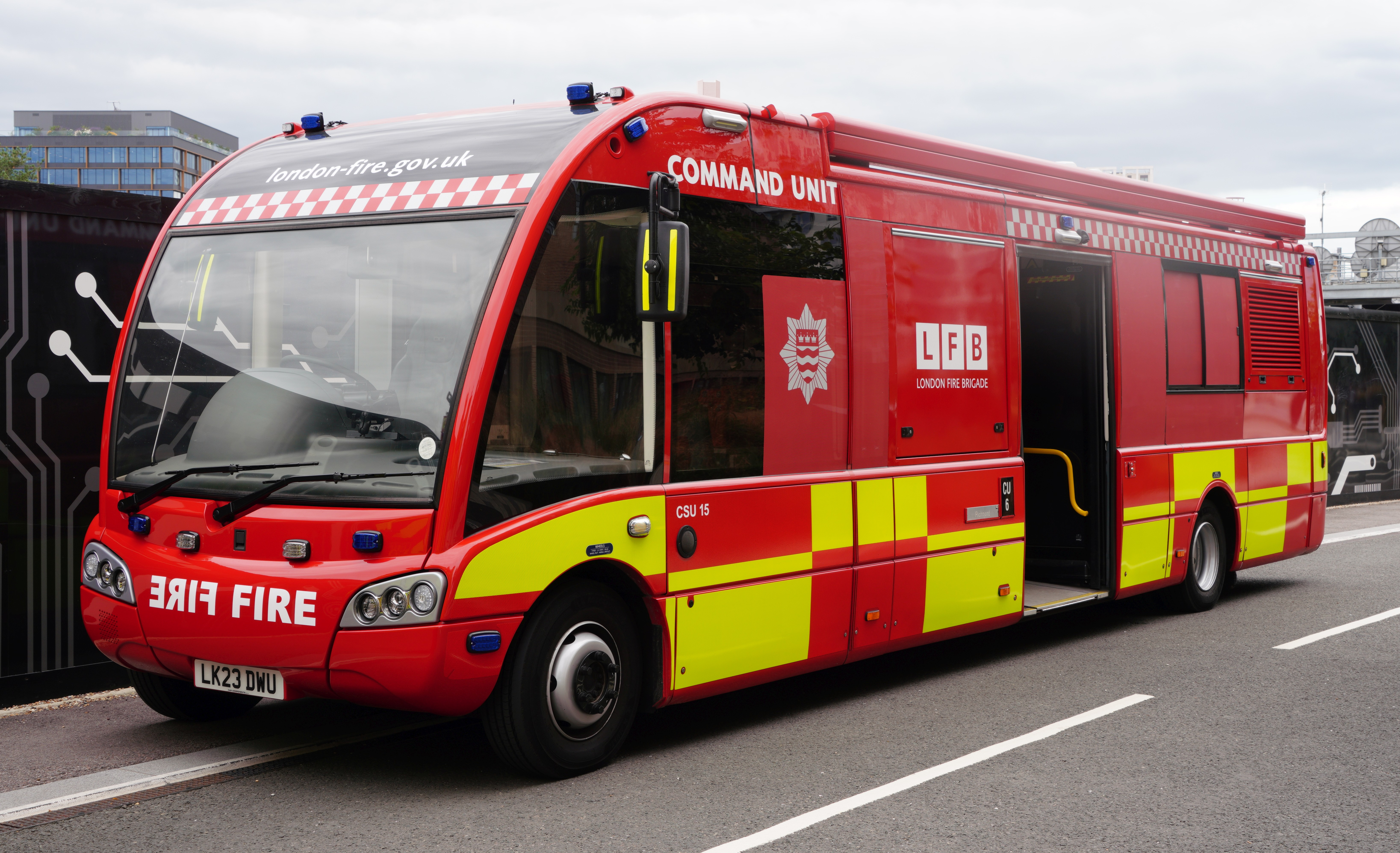
LFB Command Unit

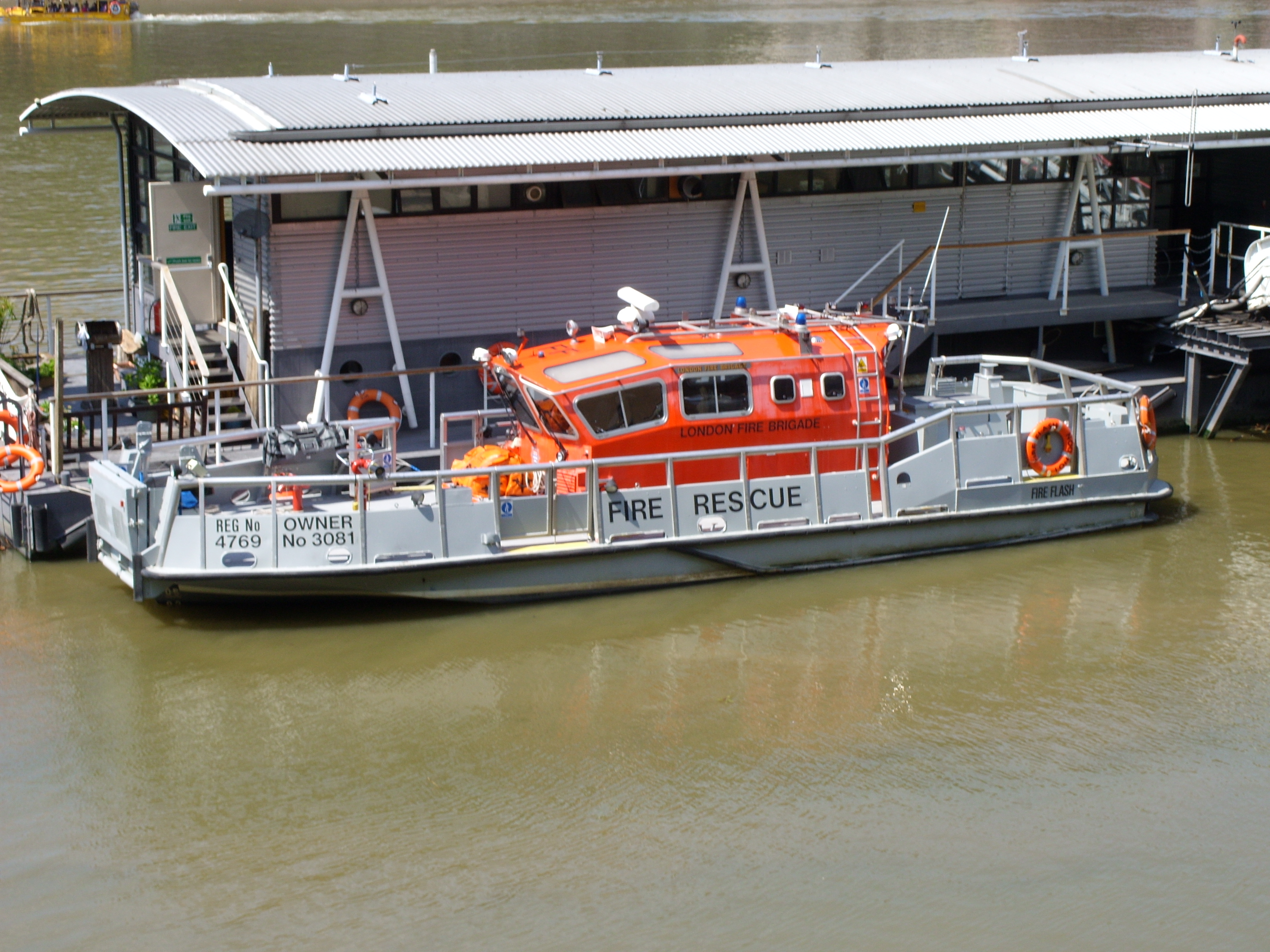
Fireflash, registered in 1999, is one of London's two fireboats

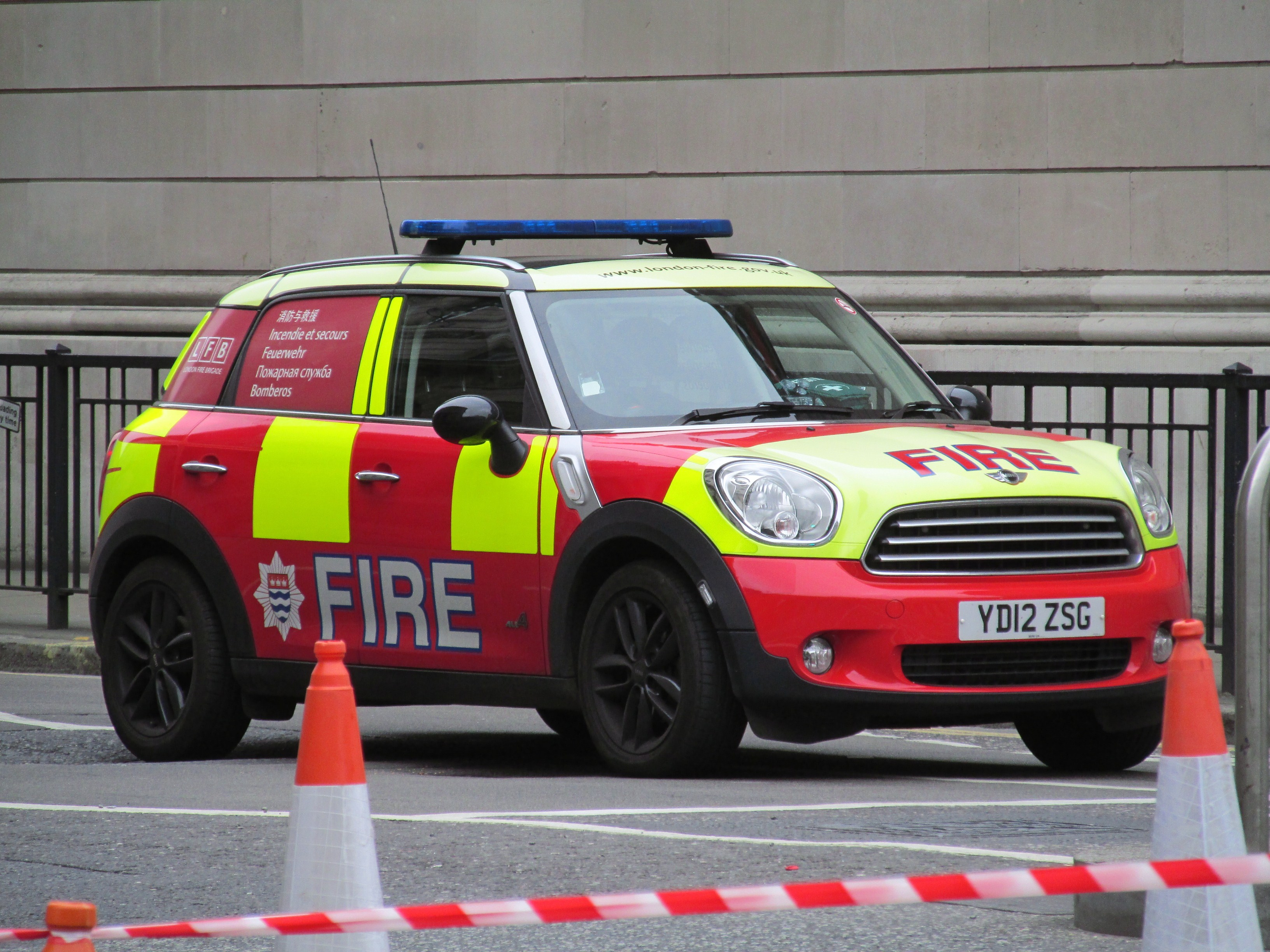
LFB Instant Response Vehicle (IRV)

=== Improvements ===
In response to the September 11 attacks, the Office of the Deputy Prime Minister set up the "New Dimensions" programme to issue all British fire and rescue services with specialised equipment to enhance their response to terrorist acts, natural disasters and other critical incidents. As part of the New Dimensions scheme, London Fire Brigade received the following government-owned appliances:

- Ten Incident Response Units (IRU) to provide mass decontamination at chemical, nuclear or biological incidents,
- Three Mass Decontamination de-robe and re-robe demountable pod units (MDD & MDR) with accompanying Prime Mover "roll-on roll-off" carrying vehicles (PM) used to dispose of contaminated clothing and to provide clean clothing to contamination victims on-scene,
- Two Detection Investigation Monitoring Units (DIM) which are basically mobile diagnostic laboratories,
- Seven demountable High Volume Pumping Units (HVPU) and accompanying Prime Movers (PM) and hose boxes, each capable of pumping the volume of water equivalent to eight standard fire engines,
- Four urban search and rescue (USAR) Units, each with three Prime Mover carrying vehicles and five demountable USAR pods. The pods carry a wide range of equipment to assist in major incidents:
- Module One is issued with a Prime Mover, and carries equipment to assist in the initial hours of a major structural collapse incident, providing emergency lighting, electricity generators, equipment for scene assessment and technical search & rescue, working at height line access capability, and heavy-duty cutting and drilling.
- Module Two is also issued with a Prime Mover, and carries heavy lifting and cutting equipment, confined space and line access equipment and is more tailored towards transport related incidents, particularly those involving the railways and aircraft.
- Module Three is not issued with a Prime Mover, and is specifically equipped to back-up Module One at major structural collapse incidents. It carries heavy breaking, breeching, moving and lifting gear, timber support, access platforms and extra lighting.
- Module Four is a dropside unit, and is issued with a Prime Mover. Primarily it carries logistics and servicing equipment, and a Bobcat four-wheeled-drive general purpose vehicle, which can be used to carry equipment, unload other modules, and to clear away rubble and debris.
- Module Five is a flatbed unit, and is not issued with a Prime Mover. It carries 10 tonnes of pre-cut timber which can be used to shore-up unstable buildings and structures.

The brigade also acquired nine London Resilience Lorries (LRL) to use in frontline roles, some relating to a major response to any potential terrorist incidents; and two Scientific Support Units (SSU) for identifying a range of chemicals and gases; and several USAR personnel carriers.

=== Fire stations ===
Architecturally, fire stations vary in age and design from Edwardian era red-brick fire houses to modern spacious blocks complete with additional specialist facilities. Early fire stations were originally built with horse-drawn appliances in mind and with traditional features such as the fireman's pole, used by firefighters to gain rapid access from their upstairs quarters to the fire engine garages below when summoned.

Many stations were built throughout the 1950s and 1960s to a standard design, such as Hayes, Stanmore, Enfield and Southgate fire stations, which all use a standardised design created by the defunct Middlesex Fire Brigade. Other stations such as Lewisham and Shoreditch used a standard LFB design. Many of these stations have not aged well, falling into disrepair, leading to them being rebuilt, such as the case of Old Kent Road.

More modern fire stations, though constructed without such features, often have more spacious accommodation and facilities for staff of both sexes, public visitor areas such as community safety offices and other amenities. An example of these is the new fire station in Hammersmith which opened in 2003, just a few hundred yards along Shepherd's Bush Road from the previous local fire station which had been constructed in 1913.

=== Modernisation ===
In 2008, existing LFB facilities were deemed unsuitable to meet the demands of modern firefighting and training. The LFB had been training firefighters at its current Grade II listed building in Southwark since 1878.

In response, the LFB signed a partnership contract with Babcock International Group PLC to provide firefighter training over the course of 25 years beginning in 2012. Babcock is also the number one training provider to the Royal Navy, which includes firefighter training. The improvement program for firefighting training will introduce two new dedicated training centres and upgrades to 10 regional training centres. There will also be further improvements through additional computers and training facilities across many of the capital's 103 fire stations. The new firefighting training systems, supplied by Process Combustion Ltd, will have low environmental impact and will allow firefighter training to take place at night under simulated extreme conditions that firefighters will face on incident ground. In addition to improving training facilities, Babcock's proposals will increase the amount of time available for firefighter training and save the LFB an estimated £66m over the next 25 years.

=== Fire station closures ===
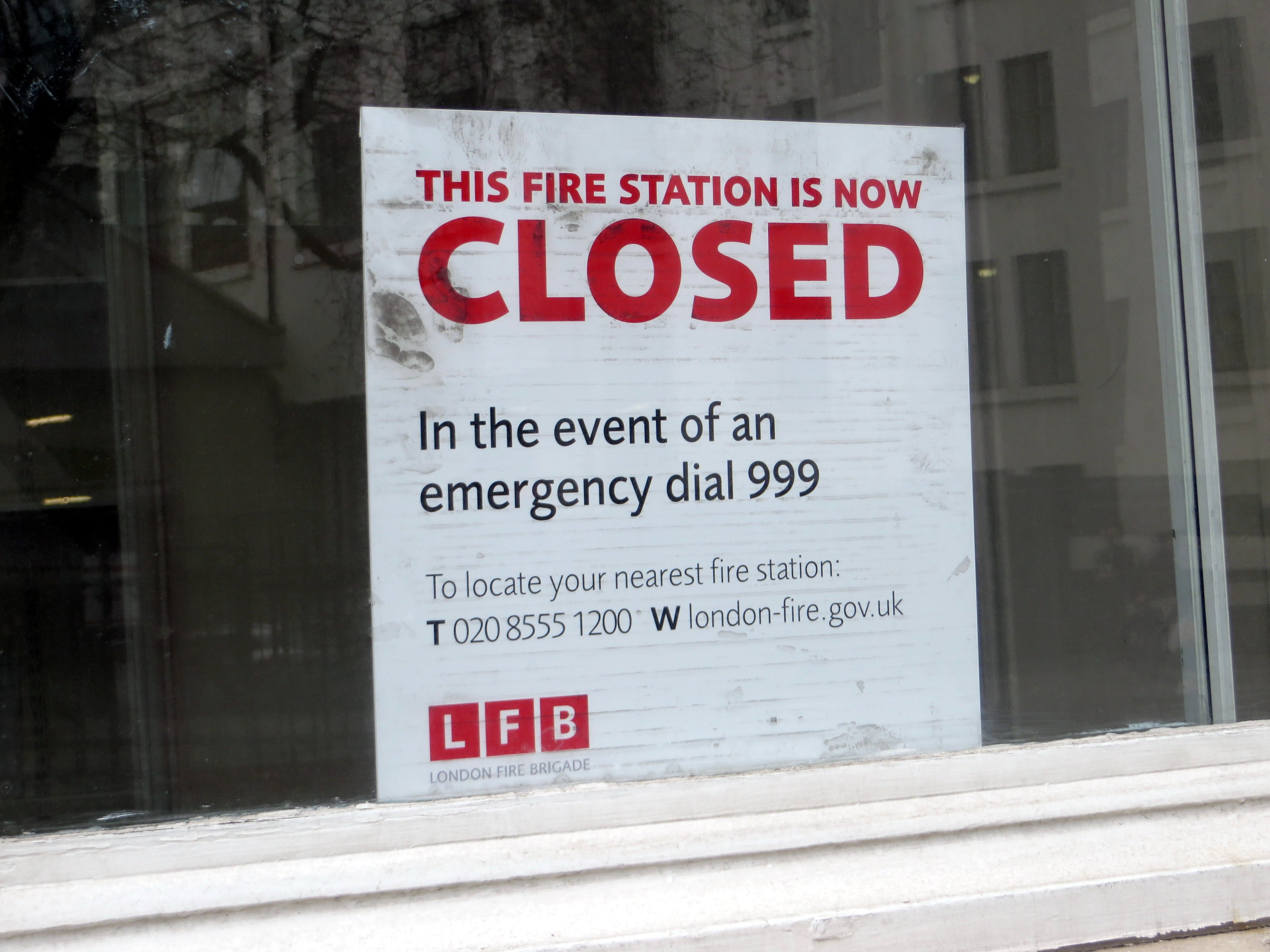
Sign in the window of Clerkenwell fire station reads "This fire station is now closed".

The creation of the Greater London Council in 1965 saw the number of LFB stations increase. The LFB absorbed some stations from the county brigades. At the time there were a handful of smaller brigades: Middlesex, Croydon, West Ham and East Ham – they were all incorporated into the LFB. By 1965 the LFB had 115 stations, plus two river stations.

The LFB has an ongoing policy of upgrading existing fire stations, and building new stations to replace those that are no longer suitable for the requirements of a modern-day fire service. In February 2010, the Mayor of London, Boris Johnson, officially opened the LFB's first new station in four years, at Harold Hill. The mayor hailed the station's exceptional environmental sustainability, calling it the "greenest station in the capital". In the past two decades, the total number of stations has reduced slightly, with the following permanent closures, including 10 in January 2014 as part of budget cuts:

- 2014: Belsize, Bow, Clerkenwell, Downham, Kingsland, Knightsbridge, Silvertown, Southwark, Westminster, and Woolwich;
- 2005: Manchester Square;
- 1999: Barbican;
- 1998: Heathrow Airport (new station subsequently opened when the central terminal area was re-classified as "A" risk);
- 1998: Shooter's Hill; and
- 1993: Sanderstead (originally a Surrey Fire Brigade station).

== Regional control centre ==
In October 2007, the Department for Communities and Local Government (DCLG) announced that the location for the new regional control centre, dedicated to the capital and part of the FiReControl project, would be at the Merton industrial estate in the London Borough of Merton. FiReControl was, however, scrapped in 2010.

== Major or notable incidents ==
The geographical area covered by the LFB along with the major transport infrastructure and the political, business and administrative bases typical of a capital city has seen the brigade involved in many significant incidents.

=== Major incident procedure ===
A "major incident" is defined as any emergency that requires the implementation of special arrangements by one or more of London's emergency services and will generally include the involvement, either directly or indirectly, of large numbers of people.

Any member of any of the emergency services can initiate a major incident. Responsibility for the rescue of persons involved lies with the LFB. The care and transportation of casualties to hospital is the responsibility of the London Ambulance Service. Police will ease these operations by co-ordinating the emergency services, local authorities and other agencies.

When a major incident is declared the services, along with civilian agencies, use a structural system known as gold-silver-bronze command that allows them to follow a set procedure for incident management. Put simply, gold relates to strategic control of an incident, silver to tactical command, and bronze to operational control. The term gold command can also relate to an emergency service building, mobile control unit or other base that becomes the focal point (often remotely) for the incident's management.

Additionally, a major incident can lead to the government activating its coordination facility, known as COBR.

=== Notable incidents ===
Notable incidents, some declared "major incidents" and some in which firefighters lost their lives, where the LFB has played a significant role include:

- North Hyde electrical substation, 2025 (10 pumps) – Shortly before midnight on 20 March 2025 ten fire engines and seventy firefighters responded to a blaze at an electrical substation at North Hyde near Hayes, west London, which took about seven hours to bring under control. There were no injuries but the fire caused Heathrow Airport nearby to lose almost all its electrical supply on 21 March, and the airport had to close completely that day, affecting more than 1,300 flights.
- Forest Gate police station, 2024 (30 pumps) – Thirty fire engines, four turntable ladders and a number of specialist vehicles responded to a blaze at a police station in Forest Gate, east London, on 6 March 2024. Officers and prisoners were evacuated without injury. The third floor and roof was reportedly completely alight, and it took almost seven hours to bring the fire under control.
- Wennington wildfire, 2022 (15 pumps) – On 19 July 2022, London Fire Brigade responded to a fire originating in a compost heap in Wennington, east London. The fire spread rapidly to neighbouring properties, grassland and multiple vehicles located throughout the village. Nineteen houses were completely destroyed, with others being damaged; more than 30 vehicles were damaged or destroyed. The village church narrowly escaped the destruction, with the graveyard and surrounding areas of the church destroyed. Residents and firefighters described the aftermath as "apocalyptic". Wennington fire station avoided damage despite being located next to the fireground.

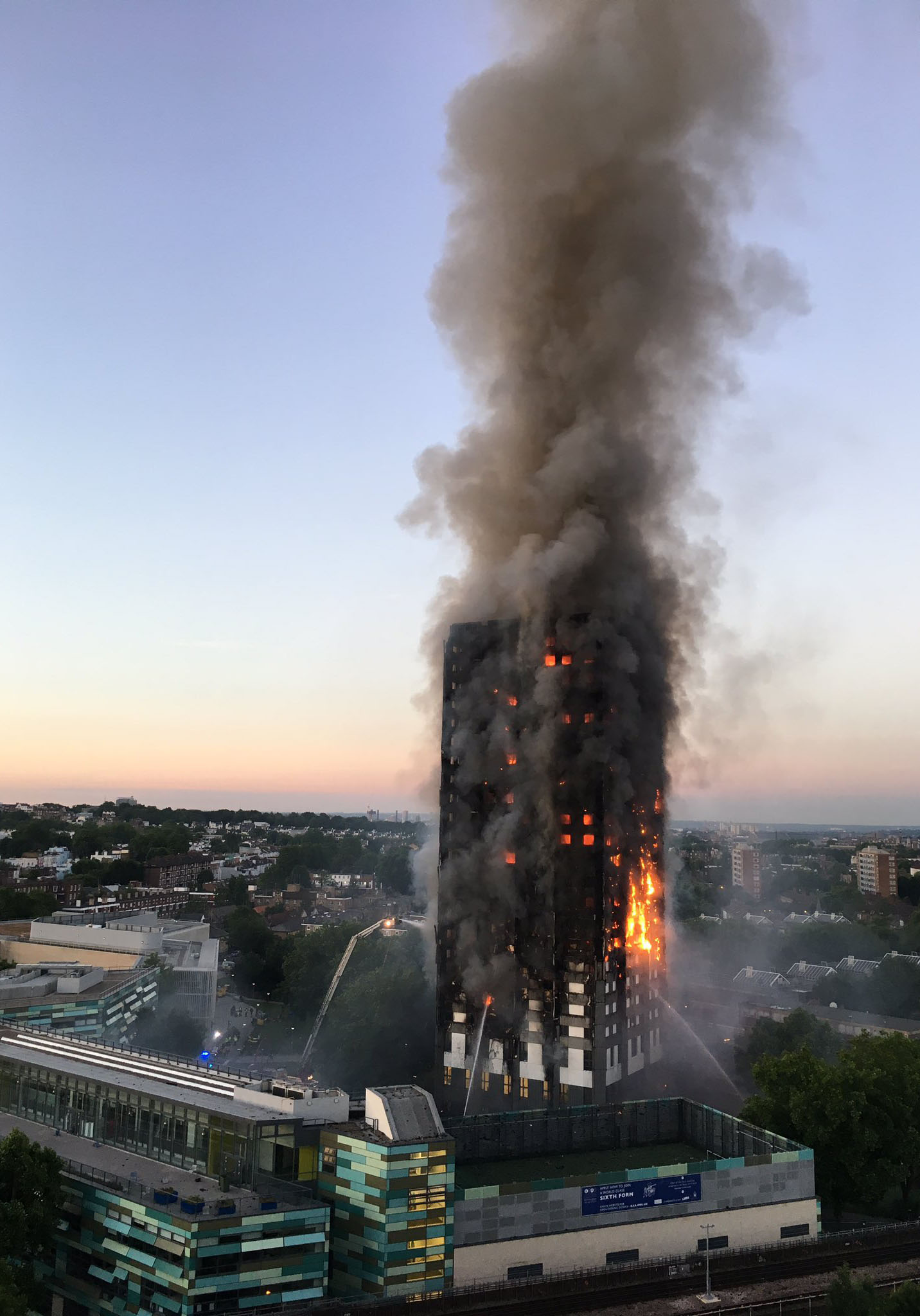
The Grenfell Tower fire in 2017

- Grenfell Tower fire, 2017 (40 pumps) – In June 2017, the LFB sent more than 200 firefighters and officers in 40 fire engines, all 14 of its fire rescue units, four aerial ladder platforms and multiple command and operational support units to the Grenfell Tower fire in north Kensington. Crews were mobilised to the large tower block, which was ultimately almost completely alight, on the Lancaster West estate in the early hours of 14 June 2017 and some remained there for several days bringing the blaze under control. One of Surrey Fire and Rescue Service's aerial ladder platforms was also requested owing to its additional height. There were 72 fatalities making the incident Britain's deadliest residential fire since the Blitz during World War II.
- Wembley industrial estate, 2017 (20 pumps) – More than 120 firefighters, 20 pumps and four aerial ladder platforms were mobilised to a large fire in industrial units in Wembley in January 2017. The blaze affected a number of two-storey units and took around 17 hours to bring under control, and days to dampen down and declare the site safe. Crews from Wembley, Northolt, Willesden, Park Royal, Stanmore and Hillingdon fire stations attended the incident.
- Camden market fire, 2014 (10 pumps) – Ten fire engines and more than 70 firefighters and officers were called to a fire at Stables Market on Chalk Farm Road, Camden, in May 2014. A number of shops under railway arches were damaged by the blaze. Around 600 people were evacuated from the area. Crews were first mobilised at around 8 p.m. and the fire was under control by 10:50 p.m. Crews from Kentish Town, Euston, West Hampstead, Lambeth, Holloway, Islington and Soho stations attended the incident. Early indications suggested that the cause of the fire was an accidental electrical issue.
- Vauxhall helicopter crash, 2013 – Nearly 150 firefighters were involved in operations following a helicopter crash in Vauxhall in misty conditions during the morning rush-hour on 16 January 2013. Several specialist vehicles, including heavy rescue and urban search and rescue, were mobilised to the scene where the wreckage fell onto a street, damaging five cars, two motorbikes and two adjacent buildings, after the aircraft's rotor blades struck a construction crane attached to St George Wharf Tower. The pilot and one person on the ground were killed in the incident. Fire crews also attended the tower block where the crane was left in a precarious position, and evacuated hundreds of workers and dozens of homes. A fireboat also carried out a precautionary search of the nearby River Thames.
- Dagenham recycling centre fire, 2012 (40 pumps) – More than 200 firefighters attended what was described by the commissioner as the largest fire in London "for several years". The LFB took slightly more than four hours to bring under control the one-storey Dagenham recycling plant the size of a football pitch which was completely alight, sending a plume of smoke over east London. In addition to 40 fire engines, an aerial ladder platform, command unit, hose layer and three operational support vehicles attended.
- Camden Market fire, 2008 (20 pumps) – Fire ravaged the stalls at the historic Camden Market in February 2008, forcing the evacuation of 450 people from the area, including 100 from their homes. Twenty fire engines and more than 100 firefighters fought to bring the blaze under control within six hours and prevent any loss of life.
- Cutty Sark fire, 2007 (six pumps) – Although no lives were endangered and a major incident was not initiated, the fire at the historic tea clipper Cutty Sark in May 2007 became a notable incident for the widespread interest of national media and the unusual circumstances – having been caused by an industrial vacuum cleaner inadvertently left switched on by renovation workers for 48 hours. Two fire appliances and an aerial appliance arrived at the scene within six minutes of the initial call to emergency services, and the commanding officer immediately requested an additional four appliances; firefighters brought the blaze under control within an hour.
- Oxford Street, 2007 (30 pumps) – From 27 to 28 April 2007 London's busiest shopping area was closed whilst more than 100 firefighters tackled a large fire in a flat above a department store on Oxford Street. The clothing retailer New Look was later fined a record £400,000 for fire safety breaches.

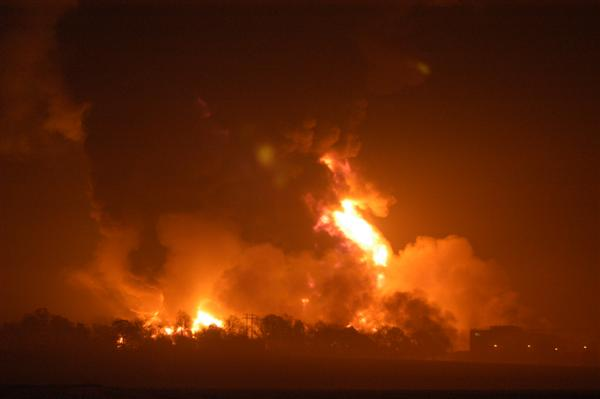
Buncefield fire

- Buncefield oil terminal, 2005 – The UK's largest peacetime fire broke out on 11 December 2005 at the Hertfordshire Oil Storage Terminal at Buncefield. Although the major incident was attended by the LFB, its role was assisting and providing additional foam supplies to the neighbouring Hertfordshire Fire and Rescue Service, to the north of London, whose "ground" the incident took place in.
- 7 July 2005 bombings (12/12/10 pumps) – Multiple major incidents were declared across London in response to the 7/7 terrorist attacks. A total of 34 pumps and nine fire-rescue units were mobilised to the four bomb sites.
- Bethnal Green Road, 2004 (eight pumps) – A fire in shops and flats in Bethnal Green Road, Bethnal Green in July 2004 gained coverage in the national media owing to the deaths of two LFB firefighters. The first LFB fatalities since 1993 were two of the 50 mobilised to the scene.
- Buckingham Palace fire, 2002 (20 pumps) – Fire broke out on 2 June 2002 in the west terrace of Buckingham Palace. At its peak, 20 fire engines and 100 firefighters were on the scene, and in the course of firefighting operations four people were rescued from the roof. The Royal Family were away at the time.
- Paddington train crash, 1999 (12 pumps) – Also known as the Ladbroke Grove rail crash, two trains collided a short distance outside of Paddington station in October 1999, killing 31 people.
- Cannon Street train crash, 1991 – Two people were killed and more than 500 injured in the Cannon Street station rail crash in January 1991.
- Marchioness disaster, 1989 – The Marchioness disaster of August 1989 involved a collision on the River Thames between a pleasure boat, the Marchioness, and a gravel dredger, the Bowbelle, resulting in the sinking of the Marchioness and the deaths of 51 people. Initial confusion over which bridge the ship had sunk near meant fireboats and fire engines were sent in the wrong direction. It was not until 30 minutes later that a station officer from Southwark radioed: "Marchioness sunk, believed downstream of Blackfriars Bridge with unknown number of people in river and Met Police searching river between Blackfriars and Waterloo Bridges."
- Clapham Junction train crash, 1988 – The Clapham Junction rail crash occurred on 12 December 1988 when a busy commuter train passed a defective signal and ran into the back of a second train, derailing it into the path of an oncoming third train. Thirty-five people died and 69 others suffered serious injury.
- King's Cross fire, 1987 – The King's Cross fire broke out on 18 November 1987 under a wooden escalator leading from one of the King's Cross St Pancras tube station platforms to the surface. The blaze and smoke claimed 31 lives, including that of Soho station officer Colin Townsley while he rescued a woman from a ticket office. Investigation and research of the fire resulted in the discovery of the trench effect.
- Hampton Court fire, 1986 (20 pumps, jointly with Surrey) – On 31 March 1986, a fire broke out at Hampton Court Palace, which killed one person. 20 fire engines and around 125 firefighters from both the LFB and the neighbouring Surrey Fire and Rescue Service were sent to the scene, which is on the border between the two areas. Firefighters played a major role in the rescue of some of the more valuable artworks from the palace.
- New Cross house fire, 1981 – The infamous New Cross house fire of 18 January 1981 claimed the lives of 13 people, all aged between 14 and 22, attending a birthday party. The exact and true cause has never been established.
- Denmark Place fire, 1980 – In the early hours of 15 August 1980, a man who was earlier ejected from an illegal drinking and gambling club in Soho returned with petrol and started a fire that killed 37 people and injured 23 others. The incident became known as the Denmark Place fire.
- The Granary warehouse, 1978 (35 pumps, six turntable ladders) – 1 October 1978 saw one of London's largest post–World War II fires, at The Granary warehouse on St. Pancras Way. At the first call at 2:58 a.m., three fire engines and a turntable ladder were sent to the scene. The scale of the blaze is evidenced by the rapid development of the LFB's mobilisation: make pumps four at 3:05 a.m.; make pumps six at 3:07 a.m.; make pumps 10 at 3:12 a.m.; make pumps 15 and turntable ladders 2 at 3:19 a.m.; make turntable ladders 4 at 3:39 a.m.; make pumps 20 and turntable ladders 6 at 3:51 a.m.; make pumps 25 at 4:19 a.m.; make hose layers 2 at 4:30 a.m.; and make pumps 35 at 5:13 a.m. At 4:50 a.m., the structure suffered a major collapse, killing firefighter Stephen Neill from Barbican station, seriously injuring three others, and destroying two fire engines.
- Moorgate train crash, 1975 – The Moorgate tube crash was a disaster on the London Underground in February 1975 when a train failed to stop and crashed into the buffers at the end of a tunnel. The driver and 42 passengers were killed.
- Worsley Hotel fire, 1974 (30 pumps) – The Worsley Hotel fire of December 1974 was an arson attack that killed seven people, including probationary firefighter Hamish Petit of Paddington station. Four fire engines, a turntable ladder and emergency tender were initially mobilised to the scene, gradually increased to 30 pumps with three turntable ladders, three emergency tenders, and hose layers. A 41-year-old kitchen porter was convicted of the attack and seven counts of manslaughter and was jailed for life.
- 1970s–1990s IRA bombing campaign – During the 1970s–1990s IRA bombing campaign throughout the last quarter of the 20th century, several major bombings were carried out in London by the Provisional IRA, including at the Palace of Westminster, Tower of London, and Harrods. A list of these and other bombings in London to which the LFB responded can be found here.
- Dudgeons Wharf, 1969 – Dudgeons Wharf on the Isle of Dogs contained a site of more than 100 tanks of various capacities up to 20,000 gallons used for storing oils and spirits. A fire started when workmen were cutting up old oil tanks. The LFB was called – six pumps, a foam tender and the fireboat Massey Shaw – and while firefighters tackled the fire an oil tank exploded. Five firefighters from Millwall and Poplar stations were killed, the largest single loss of life in the LFB since the Second World War.
- Bishopsgate goods yard, 1964 (40 pumps, 12 turntable ladders) – London's main railway goods terminal at Bishopsgate was gutted by a spectacular fire in December 1964. Within 37 minutes of the first crews arriving on scene, the scale of the blaze was so intense and widespread that 40 fire engines had been mobilised. In addition, 12 turntable ladders, two hose layers, two emergency tenders, and 235 firefighters battled the fire which killed two customs officials and destroyed hundreds of railway wagons, dozens of motor vehicles and millions of pounds worth of goods. The site remained derelict for the next 30 years until being rebuilt as Shoreditch High Street railway station.
- Smithfield market, 1958 (50 pumps) – Over the course of firefighting operations at London's central meat market in January 1958, a total of 389 fire engines with more than 1,700 firefighters from 58 fire stations worked in shifts to tackle a fire of exceptional proportions.

After the initial call, the LFB mobilised three pumps, a turntable ladder and emergency tender at 2:18 a.m. Upon arrival, a station officer and firefighter from Clerkenwell station headed down into the basement where it was apparent a major fire had broken out. Both became trapped in the basement cellars and suffocated to death. Excessive heat, dense smoke and worsening conditions meant crews had to be rotated as frequently as every 15 minutes, as firefighters suffered from severe heat exhaustion.
Twenty-four hours later, with 800 oxygen cylinders used, the fire in the basement suddenly broke up into the first floor of the market, with flames seeping 100 feet (30 m) in the air, engulfing the entire market. The fire, although brought under control and reduced, was not fully extinguished for two weeks. Valuable lessons were learnt after the Smithfield blaze, including introducing a tally system of firefighters' locations and quantity of breathing apparatus.
On the 50th anniversary of the Smithfield blaze, in 2008, the then Deputy Commissioner of the LFB said: "This was a landmark fire in the history of London and its fire brigade. It is important that we remember this tragic fire and honour the memory of the two London firefighters who lost their lives."

- Covent Garden warehouse fire, 1954 – While fighting a fire in a five-storey warehouse adjacent to Covent Garden, a station officer and firefighter, both of Clerkenwell station, were killed. Six more were hospitalised, with three requiring plastic surgery treatment.
- London Blitz – on 7 September 1940, a sub-officer at West Ham fire station witnessed the start of the Blitz by Nazi Germany on London. He reported that three miles of waterfront buildings had become a continuous blaze, and ordered 500 fire engines to be mobilised. The commander thought this an exaggeration and sent someone to investigate the situation, who reported back that 1,000 were required. More than 300 firefighters perished in the widespread and sustained bombing campaign, including two in a direct hit on Soho fire station and six in a direct hit on Wandsworth fire station.
- Crystal Palace fire, 1936 (88 pumps) – A major fire which led to the complete destruction of the Crystal Palace on 30 November 1936 was attended by 88 fire engines and 438 firefighters from the London Fire Brigade and three other brigades, plus 749 police officers.
- Colonial Wharf, 1935 (60 pumps) – An eight-storey rubber warehouse in Wapping High Street burned for four days from 27 September 1935, with 60 fire engines in attendance. It was the first major incident for one of the LFB's most famous fireboats, the Massey Shaw, which greatly assisted land crews, who were hampered by inaccessibility, by supplying a vast water jet to allow the land crews to regroup and prevent the fire from spreading to adjoining warehouses.
- Vauxhall, 1918 – A fire on 30 January 1918 claimed the lives of seven London firefighters. Staff at Vauxhall fire station were alerted to the incident by a passer-by, and upon arrival found a three-storey private house well alight, with the roof and upper floor partially collapsed. The fire was extinguished within two hours but firefighters remained in the building dampening down. It was then, while the men were on the ground floor, that the building suffered a total structural collapse. Six firefighters died on scene, one later from severe injury, and two suffered lesser injuries.

=== Notable exercises ===
- Exercise Unified Response, 2016 – London Fire Brigade led the planning and staging of a large, multi-agency exercise at multiple sites in London, simulating the collapse of Waterloo station onto an underground train.

== In popular culture ==
- London's Firefighters: Edited by David C Pike and published by Austin Macauley Publishers (ISBN 978-1-78455-541-2) in 2015. An illustrated anthology of articles, fiction and verse about the London Fire Brigade, much of it drawn from the award-winning in-house magazine London Fireman (1966–1982) and London Firefighter (1982–2005). The book celebrates the 150th anniversary in 2016 of London's fire brigades (1866–2016) by delivering both a comprehensive history of the London Fire Brigade and a portrait of individual firemen and firewomen at work and (occasionally) at play. The illustrations, many from the London Fire Brigade and the Mary Evans Picture Library offer a commentary on the text.
- Beyond the Flames: Written by David C Pike and published by Austin Macauley Publishers (ISBN 978-1-84963-396-3) in 2013. It is a personal, insider's account of the life and history of the London Fire Brigade from 1965 to the late 1990s. This book was runner-up in the 2014 The People's Book Prize (UK) (the UK's prestigious first-time author literary award) and was nominated for the Beryl Bainbridge Award 2014. In 2015 Beyond the Flames was a finalist in the (Wishing Shelf Independent Books Awards). David Pike was awarded the Queen's Commendation for Brave Conduct, and went on to rise to senior rank and organised many of the Brigade's most high-profile events in the early 1990s.
- Fire Wars: In July 2003, the BBC followed the arson investigators of the LFB's fire investigation unit. The two-part series looked at how the LFB investigated "4,000 fires where the cause was unknown". The second programme, Fire Wars: Murder Most Foul, centred on one investigation.
- London's Burning: The ITV television series London's Burning was based on the fictional Blackwall fire station and centred on characters of the station's blue watch. It was originally a 1986 television film, written by Jack Rosenthal. The fire station used as the principal location in the drama was Dockhead, near London Bridge, before moving to Leyton fire station in east London late in the series. The series that followed the film ran from 1988 to 2002.
- Fire!: The LFB's Kingsland Road fire station in Hackney, east London, was the focus of a documentary series by Thames Television for ITV, broadcast in the spring of 1991.
- Fireman! A Personal Account: Former London firefighter Neil Wallington wrote this account of his experience in the LFB, published in 1979. He chronicled his transition from a firefighter in the Croydon Fire Brigade through to his reaching the rank of station officer in the LFB. He went on to become the Chief Fire Officer of the Devon fire brigade (now known as Devon and Somerset Fire and Rescue Service) and has written several books about fire services over the world. Wallington's work outlined the change in working conditions in the LFB in the 1970s, a time that saw the working hours of firefighters reduced and conditions improved.
- Red Watch: The former ITN newsreader Gordon Honeycombe became friendly with Neil Wallington while he was a station officer at Paddington fire station. In 1976, Honeycombe published an account of the Worsley Hotel fire, a major fire at a hostel in Maida Vale in 1974 that claimed the lives of seven people including one firefighter. The book provided a graphic account of a single incident, and outlined some of the changes to working practices that resulted from it.

== See also ==
- Cyril Demarne
- Fire Service College
- FireLink
- List of fire departments
- List of British firefighters killed in the line of duty
- London Air Ambulance
- London Salvage Corps
- National Fire Savers Credit Union
- Royal National Lifeboat Institution
