= Wallington (surname) =

Wallington is a toponymic surname derived from a common English place name. The name "Wallington" derives from the Anglo Saxon "Waletone" meaning "Farm of the serfs or Britons".

== People with the surname ==
- Aury Wallington, American novelist and television writer
- Edward Wallington (courtier) (1854–1933), English colonial administrator and cricketer
- Ernie Wallington (1895–1959), English footballer
- Francis Wallington (1891–1971), British Army officer
- George Wallington (1924–1993), American jazz pianist and composer
- Jim Wallington (1944–1988), American featherweight boxer
- Jimmy Wallington (1907–1972), American radio and TV personality
- John Wallington (1790–1872), English army officer and cricketer
- Mark Wallington (footballer) (born 1952), English goalkeeper
- Mark Wallington (writer) (born 1953), English author of "Boogie"
- Nehemiah Wallington (1598–1658), English Puritan artisan
- Neil Wallington, British firefighter and author
- Sid Wallington (1908–1989), English footballer
- Tony Wallington (born 1948), British bobsledder
- Vivienne Wallington (born 1937), Australian author of romance novels
- Wally Wallington, American construction worker
- Kate Wallington, Australian Swimmer
