= Lionel Wells (Royal Navy officer, born 1859) =

British naval officer, fire brigade officer and political agent

Portrait while Chief Officer of the Metropolitan Fire Brigade

Captain Sir Lionel de Lautour Wells, CB, CMG, CBE (31 January 1859 – 15 March 1929) was a British naval officer, fire brigade officer, and political agent. After a career in the Royal Navy which began in 1871, he was Chief Officer of the Metropolitan Fire Brigade from 1896 to 1903, when he became Chief Agent of the Conservative Party, serving until his resignation 1905.

During the First World War, he returned to active service, for which he was appointed CB, CMG, and CBE, as well as receiving the American Distinguished Service Medal. He was knighted in 1921.

== Early life ==
Wells was born in Kolkata, India, on 31 January 1859 and educated at Cheltenham. He entered the Royal Navy in 1871, aged twelve. His naval career included service as a lieutenant aboard HMS Iris during the Anglo-Egyptian War of 1882 and promotion to commander in June 1892.

== Metropolitan Fire Brigade ==
At the age of 37, the London County Council appointed Wells Chief Officer of the Metropolitan Fire Brigade in 1896. Despite limited firefighting experience, he pursued reforms across the service. He reorganised river crews, designed a new fireboat and improved ladder transport. Canvas hoses replaced leather ones, while recruitment ceased to depend on previous naval service.

Wells also improved firefighters' working conditions and introduced canteen vans to provide refreshments at ongoing major incidents. His modernisation programme included electric station bells, motorised equipment and proposals for additional fire stations.

A fire in Queen Victoria Street in 1902, which killed nine people, brought sustained newspaper criticism, although the inquest jury praised the brigade. Wells subsequently changed arrangements for horses to speed departures and introduced hook ladders for rescues. He resigned in 1903, being succeeded by James de Courcy Hamilton; the organisation was renamed to the London Fire Brigade the following year.

Wells returned to naval service during the First World War, became a commodore in 1917 and was knighted in 1921. He died on 15 March 1929.
