= Croydon Fire Brigade =

Defunct fire brigade in Croydon, England

Operational area
- Country: United Kingdom
- County: Surrey
- County borough: Croydon

Agency overview
- Established: 1867
- Dissolved: 1965
- Annual calls: 2,634 (1964)
- Staffing: 167 full-time firefighters 14 control staff 110 AFS firefighters (1964)
- Chief Fire Officer: R.R Lloyd (1964)

Facilities and equipment
- Stations: 5 (1964)

The Croydon Fire Brigade was the fire and rescue service for the County Borough of Croydon from 1867 to 1965. The brigade was established via the merger of several local ad-hoc brigades variously established by the local board of health and local trade associations, and from 1889 onwards was administered by the Croydon Corporation. The brigade had various notable moments during its existence, including battling the Crystal Palace fire and being the first fire brigade in the United Kingdom to fit two-way radios to all of its fire engines. In 1965, Croydon would become a London Borough under the new county of Greater London, and the brigade would be absorbed into the London Fire Brigade.

== History ==
The first recorded fire station in Croydon was on Surrey Street; it was established in 1745 in the grounds of the Market House (a now long-demolished early town hall) and housed three wheeled portable fire pumps designed to be used by local residents in the event of a fire. As the town grew, more formalised firefighting arrangements were established, and by 1866, the Croydon Local Board of Health had established three separate fire brigades; one paid career brigade established in 1850, the Croydon Volunteer Fire Brigade established in November 1864 with 20 men occupying the Surrey Street station, and the South Norwood Volunteer Fire Brigade consisting of 4 men in South Norwood. By this time, the paid brigade had a total of 18 firefighters, one fire pump engine, one hose reel cart, and one wheeled fire escape ladder, with an annual expenditure of £80 (roughly £8,300 in 2026). Similarly, the two volunteer brigades had 35 firefighters and two engines between them with a total annual expenditure of £100 (roughly £10,400 in 2026). Together, the board of health brigades were funded from the local rates, with additional contributions from donors towards the volunteer brigades. Additionally, in September 1864 a private brigade was established by a local trade association, consisting of 25 firefighters (24 volunteers and 1 professional) manning two fire pumps at an annual running cost of £140 (roughly £14,600 in 2026) which was paid by voluntary subscriptions. Overall, the town averaged 40 fires a year during this period.

In 1867, the competing brigades were merged together in order to form a single Croydon Fire Brigade, and by 1880 the brigade operated on the retained duty system and had come to provide the local ambulance service. Then, in 1889, control of the brigade passed from the board of health to the newly created Croydon Corporation, the local authority for the newly created County Borough of Croydon. The following years were home to many controversies: in January 1898, several members of Croydon's Fire Brigade Committee called for the dismissal of the Superintendent, Thompson, for allowing lax procedure and discipline. It was cited that brigade members visited licensed houses in contravention of formal rules, with the Superintendent's full knowledge and consent. In the event, the committee recommended the Superintendent be severely censured and that two members of the brigade be discharged. Then, after attending a large timber conflagration on 8 May 1905, the brigade was criticised by the head of the London Salvage Corps, Colonel Fox, who considered it "20 years behind the times for a prompt turn-out on a call of fire in a town of over 100,000 inhabitants."

In 1911 a short, silent, black and white cine film was made demonstrating the duties carried out by the Croydon Fire Brigade. Footage includes extinguishing fires, the fireman's lift and catching a person jumping from a tower on to a safety sheet held by firemen. Three years later during a drill, a member of the brigade was killed when a rope snapped while he was descending from a tower. Examination of the rope found it to be in excellent condition, other than the part that broke which had been weakened by acid. The coroner's jury announced a verdict of accidental death and apportioned no blame.

The Great War saw reservist firefighters called up to serve, and replacement volunteers were provided from the workforce of local department stores such as Grants, Kennards and Allders. On 13 October 1915, a Zeppelin airship dropped 18 bombs over Croydon. No fires broke out but the fire brigade was involved in rescue efforts and the recovery of bodies from the many damaged buildings. Following the end of the war, the brigade became the first in Britain to fit radio communications to headquarters in all appliances following the appointment of Frederick Delve as Chief Fire Officer.

The brigade formed an Auxiliary Fire Service in 1938 in preparation for the outbreak of World War II, and the main brigade was amalgamated into the National Fire Service in 1941 under the wartime reorganisation of the fire services. Throughout World War II, the brigade fought 2,542 major fires caused by bombing. Following the war, the brigade was re-established with the passing of the Fire Services Act 1947, and the Croydon AFS was re-established in 1949 as part of the Civil Defence Corps, now intended to respond to a nuclear attack; two stations – Woodside and Old Town – were home to AFS units, and these remained in operation until the brigade's dissolution.

The brigade ceased to exist on 1 April 1965 upon the formation of the London Borough of Croydon. All of the brigade's stations, staff, and appliances were transferred to the London Fire Brigade, alongside those of the Sanderstead and Purley stations of the Surrey Fire Brigade located in the Coulsdon and Purley Urban District, which was merged with the county borough to form the new London Borough of Croydon. The Old Town fire station became the headquarters of the LFB's southern command, and the Croydon Fire Brigade's last Chief Fire Officer, R.R Lloyd, became the commander of the southern command of the LFB, holding the rank of Assistant Chief Fire Officer.

=== Chief Officers ===
- 1905 – 1933: J.W Dane, M.I.Fire E.
- 1934 – 1941: Frederick W Delve, M.I.Fire E. (became Chief Officer of the London Fire Brigade in 1948)
- 1941 – 1948: None, brigade amalgamated into National Fire Service
- 1948 – 1952: A. Netherwood, OBE, M.I.Fire E.
- 1952 – 1958: E.R Ashill, M.I.Fire E.
- 1958 – 1965: R.R Lloyd, M.I.Fire E.

== Stations and apparatus ==
The brigade and its precursors operated relatively few fire stations over the course of their history, serving only the relatively geographically small county borough compared to the large area covered by county brigades. As a result, the brigade commonly engaged in cross-border cooperation with the local town brigades of Penge, Bromley, and Beckenham, and the larger county brigades of London and Surrey. While the older buildings built in the 18th and 19th centuries no longer stand, some of the more modern stations built in the 20th century continue to be used today by the brigade's successor, the London Fire Brigade. The 8 stations operated by the brigade throughout its history and their dates of operation were:

- Surrey Street Fire Station (1745-1869) – The first fire station in Croydon, this station closed in 1869 when the brigade moved to its new Katharine Street headquarters.
- South Norwood Fire Station (1864-Unknown) – The station moved from St John's Road to 26a High Street in 1865. It was the headquarters of the South Norwood Volunteer Fire Brigade up until 1887, when it was passed to the Croydon Fire Brigade and moved to South Norwood Hill.
- Katharine Street Fire Station (1869-1906) – This was the headquarters of the Croydon Fire Brigade from 1869 to 1906, when the Park Lane headquarters was built.
- Thornton Heath Fire Station (1885-c.1970) – This station moved from Beulah Road to Brigstock Road in 1914. The London Fire Brigade continued to run this station from amalgamation to around 1970, following the opening of Norbury fire station.
- Park Lane Fire Station (1906-1961) – This was the headquarters of the Croydon Fire Brigade from 1906 to 1961, when the Old Town headquarters was built.
- Woodside Fire Station (1932-Present) – Located at 2 Lodge Lane, the London Fire Brigade took over this station in 1965 and continues to operate it.
- New Addington Fire Station (1960-Present) – Located at 197 Lodge Lane, the London Fire Brigade took over this station in 1965 and continues to operate it.
- Old Town Fire Station (1961-Present) – From 1961, this was the headquarters of the Croydon Fire Brigade. A building in the right of the station courtyard (now a training centre) was home to the Auxiliary Fire Service. This station was transferred to the London Fire Brigade in 1965, who continue to use the station as the headquarters for the Croydon group.

The precursor brigades had between them four hand-operated fire pump engines and other ancillary equipment; before amalgamation, the paid board of health brigade had a 16-inch pump bore engine rated to be operated by 24 men, alongside 500 ft of leather fire hose in a separate hose reel cart, and a wheeled fire escape ladder. Similarly, the trade association volunteer brigade had one engine with two 6-inch pump bores rated for operation by 24 men alongside 500 ft of canvas hose, and the two board of health volunteer brigades had a 7-inch pump bore engine rated for 30 men and a 6.5-inch pump bore engine rated for 24 men, alongside 800 ft of leather and 300 ft of canvas fire hose.

Following amalgamation, the Croydon Fire Brigade purchased its first steam-powered pump engine in 1897 from the Shand Mason company; motorisation continued slowly, with a motorised pump escape and chemical tender being purchased in 1904 and the first petrol engines in 1912, until the fleet was fully motorised in 1914 with the introduction of motor ambulances. By 1922, the fleet consisted of 7 vehicles primarily of the Dennis N-Type, consisting of 3 pump escapes, 1 pump, 1 hose wagon (which could be modified to bear a stretcher), and 2 ambulances (one being of Crossley manufacture).

== Notable incidents ==
The brigade responded to many notable incidents during its time, including the following:

- South Croydon air crash, 1924 – An Imperial Airways DH-34 departing from Croydon Airport crashed on 24 December, killing all 7 occupants. This led to the UK's first public inquiry into an air disaster.
- Motor body works fire, 1924 – A motor body works factory in East Croydon caught fire on 18 April. The ensuing fire lasted from 10pm on the Friday until 8am the following morning.
- Crystal Palace fire, 1936 – On 30 November, the Crystal Palace in Penge Common was burnt to the ground by a major fire. The Croydon Fire Brigade sent many pumps to the scene, alongside the Penge, Beckenham, and London brigades.
- Waddon air raid, 1940 – An attempted air raid by the Luftwaffe on Croydon Airport (then RAF Croydon) led to several bombs landing on homes and factories in the Waddon area, killing 74 people.
- South Croydon rail crash, 1947 – Due to a mistake by a signalman, a train from Tattenham Corner crashed into the rear of a train from Haywards Heath just south of South Croydon railway station, killing 32 and injuring 60.
- Savoy Cinema fire, 1953 – On 30 March, a major fire at the Savoy Cinema in West Croydon was fought by firefighters from the Croydon, London, Surrey, and Kent brigades.
- Mundetts Cork factory fire, 1955 – On 29 October, a major fire at the Mundetts Cork Products Ltd factory on Vicarage Road destroyed 75% of the building and threatened a nearby railway line.
- Goodyear Tyre factory fire, 1960 – On 8 June, the Goodyear Tyre Co. Ltd factory on Vulcan Way in New Addington caught fire, attended by 10 pumps from Croydon, London, Surrey, and Kent.
