= Process Combustion Ltd. =

Process Combustion Ltd (PCL) is a now defunct international supplier of products and applicable support services based on combustion and heat transfer technology located in Harrogate, England. PCL specializes in combustion engineering, heat transfer and controls.

PCL designed, supplied and installed fire training units for the British Royal Navy, the London Fire Brigade, Greece’s Hellenic Navy and the United States Air Force at Mildenhall and Lakenheath (RAF Mildenhall and RAF Lakenheath).
