= Neil Wallington =

Neil Wallington is a former firefighter who served in the London Fire Brigade and wrote about his experiences in the 1979 book Fireman! A personal account. The book includes one chapter about the Worsley Hotel fire which claimed the lives of seven people including one firefighter. He subsequently went on to rise through the ranks of the fire service to become the Chief Officer of Devon Fire and Rescue Service, and has written several books about firefighting and the fire service.
