= Frederick Delve =

English firefighter

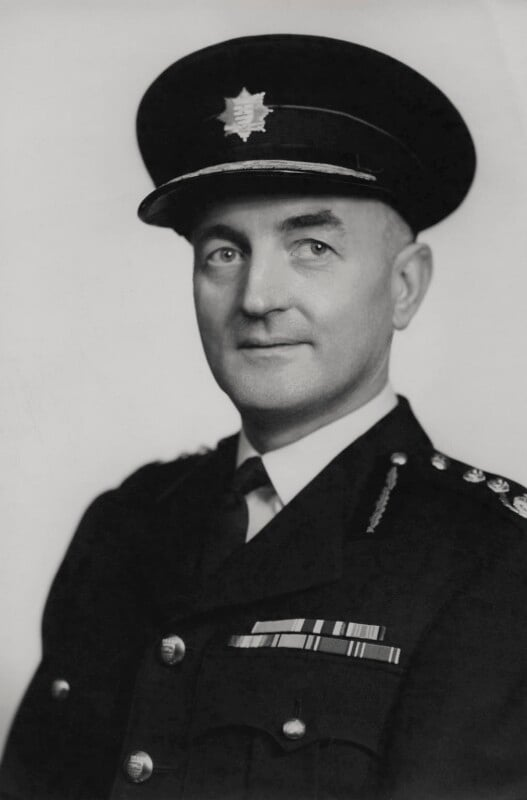
Delve in 1953

Sir Frederick William Delve, CBE (28 October 1902 - 2 October 1995), was an English firefighter who became chief fire officer of the London Fire Brigade from 1948 to 1962, and was instrumental in the fire service's adoption of modern telecommunications technologies.

== Early life ==
Delve was born in Brighton, the son of a tailor, and joined the Royal Navy on his 16th birthday in 1918, working as a wireless telegraphist in the Black Sea, an experience which spawned his enthusiasm for modern telecommunications. In 1922 Delve he left the Navy and joined the Brighton Fire Brigade.

== Fire service ==
By 1929, aged 27, he had been promoted to the rank of Second Officer, the youngest in Britain. In 1934, he moved to the Croydon Fire Brigade as Chief Officer, leading its installation of radio telecommunications between all fire appliances and headquarters, and supervising the brigade's deployment at the fire which destroyed the Crystal Palace in Sydenham in November 1936.

In 1937, with World War II looming, Delve served on a Home Office committee advising on changes to Britain's fire service. Its recommendations were implemented following the Fire Brigades Act 1938 (1 & 2 Geo. 6. c. 72), which established the Auxiliary Fire Service and admitted women to fire brigades.

During the war he was appointed Deputy Inspector-in-Chief of Fire Services, advising on fire support needs and helping to establish the National Fire Service in 1941 (in January 1941, he was awarded the King's Police and Fire Services Medal, 'for gallantry'). He was then appointed Chief Officer of No 5 Region (covering the London area), in which role he extended use of radio communications in fire vessels along the River Thames, and was also an adviser on fire bombing.

== Chief officer of London Fire Brigade ==
After the war, Delve was appointed Chief Officer of the reconstituted London Fire Brigade in 1948. Challenges included provision of fire services to tower blocks and to traffic accidents, and the movement of hazardous materials across the capital (in 1958, Delve produced a report, Fireman's Handbook of Hazardous Industries, published by London County Council). Under his leadership, street-based fire alarms were replaced by the '999' system (first introduced in central London in 1937), fire appliances were modernised and fire stations rebuilt.

Major fires in Covent Garden market (1949 and 1954), the Goodge Street deep tunnels (1956), and Smithfield meat market basement (1958 - during which two firemen died) led to changes in procedures relating to breathing apparatus. Delve and his deputy and successor, Leslie Leete, proposed control procedures that eventually became national policy, and also recommended the fitting of warning devices to breathing apparatus so that users were alerted when their oxygen supplies were running low.

Having been awarded CBE in 1942, Delve was the first LFB chief to be knighted in office, in the 1962 Birthday Honours. After his 1962 retirement, he joined the board of Securicor.
