= Leslie Leete =

Former Chief Fire Officer in the London Fire Brigade

Leslie William Thomas Leete CBE QFSM (18 December 1909 – 31 August 1976) was an English firefighter who became chief fire officer of the London Fire Brigade from 1962 to 1970 – the first LFB chief to have served in every rank within the Brigade.

== Early career ==
Leete joined the Auxiliary Fire Service in 1938. He started as a river fireman and later became a professional fireman in 1939 on the outbreak of war, and saw service during The Blitz in 1940. At this time, the London Fire Brigade (LFB) was still under the control of London County Council; it became part of the National Fire Service from 1941 to 1948, after which the LFB was re-established under the control of the County Council.

Leete was appointed deputy chief fire officer in 1953, serving under Sir Frederick Delve (1902–1995), chief officer from 1948 to 1962.

Major fires in Covent Garden market (1949 and 1954), the Goodge Street deep tunnels (1956), and Smithfield meat market basement (1958 – during which two firemen died) led to changes in procedures relating to breathing apparatus. Delve and Leete proposed control procedures that eventually became national policy, and also recommended the fitting of warning devices to breathing apparatus so that users were alerted when their oxygen supplies were running low.

== Chief fire officer ==
As chief fire officer from 1962 to 1970, Leete introduced several innovations, some driven by improvements in technology, others by the need for change. For example, in 1963 he pushed the adoption of a new mobilising scheme. This discontinued 'manned' watch-rooms at every London station, which had required a fireman to be on duty at all times and to receive calls or signals from the Brigade control room, automatic fire alarms, direct fire telephones connected to the fire station, and 'running calls' from members of the public. Similarly, the transmission of calls to fire stations via teleprinter allowed some 200 members of the brigade to be released to firefighting duties instead of sitting in their watchrooms while other firemen went out on a call or performed outside duties.

The Offices, Shops and Railway Premises Act 1963 brought thousands of new premises under the scrutiny of London Fire Brigade fire prevention officers. Premises controlled under the London Building Acts also required fire crews from fire stations to undertake certain inspections. It became a regular part of fire station life for an officer and crew to go to local factories to inspect fire prevention measures and gain local knowledge if a fire occurred.

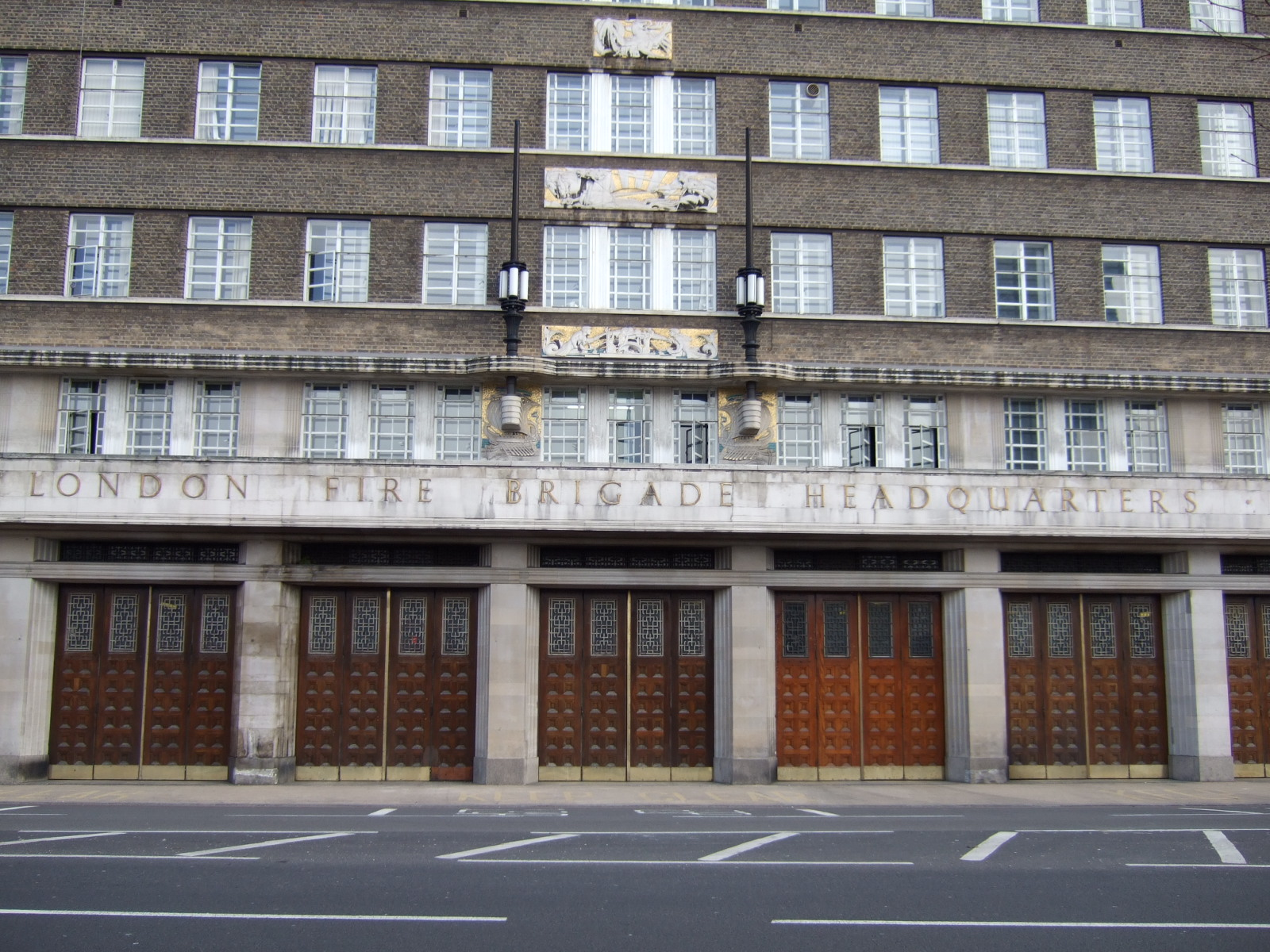
London Fire Brigade headquarters from 1937 to 2007, in Lambeth.

The 1965 creation of Greater London Council unified central London's brigade with fire brigades from Middlesex, parts of Essex, Hertfordshire, Kent and Surrey, all coming together under the banner of the London Fire Brigade – then the largest municipal fire brigade in the world – with Leete as chief officer. The following year, Leete oversaw the LFB's centenary celebrations, during which the Queen formally opened a new Brigade control room at Lambeth, which at the time was state of the art.

After the June 1969 Leinster Tower Hotel fire in Bayswater, where over 50 people were rescued from the hotel and without any fatalities, Leete issued the first special order, a Commendation, which described the fire as being "without parallel in the Brigade's history for the magnitude of the task... and the excellence of the firefighting work performed."

== Honours ==
Previously awarded the MBE in the 1952 New Year Honours, Leete was appointed a CBE in the 1965 New Year Honours. His post nominals also included the Q.F.S.M. (Queen's Fire Service Medal) and the O.St.J. (Order of St John).

After retirement on 10 May 1970, Leete moved to Luton. He died on 31 August 1976.
