= Exercise Unified Response =

Exercise Unified Response was a large multi-agency emergency services exercise held near London from 29 February to 3 March 2016. The exercise was conducted at four sites simultaneously across central and south east London, with much of the live action taking place at Littlebrook Power Station, Dartford. The exercise scenario was centred around a building collapse onto Waterloo station during rush hour. An area of the exercise site was prepared with London Underground carriages and rubble from which simulated casualties were extracted by rescue services.

The organisation of the exercise was led by London Fire Brigade, and the exercise involved around 70 partner agencies, including the London Ambulance Service, the Metropolitan Police, local authorities, British Red Cross, The Salvation Army, St John Ambulance, and specialist teams including Urban search and rescue and disaster victim identification.

The exercise also included activation of the EU civil protection mechanism, with teams arriving from other member countries, Hungary, Italy and Cyprus to assist the local emergency services.
