= Gordon Honeycombe =

British newscaster, actor and writer (1936–2015)

- Born: Ronald Gordon Honeycombe; 27 September 1936; Karachi, British India
- Died: 9 October 2015 (aged 79); Australia
- Education: Edinburgh Academy; University College, Oxford,
- Occupations: Broadcaster, author, playwright, actor

Ronald Gordon Honeycombe (27 September 1936 – 9 October 2015) was a British newscaster, author, playwright and stage actor.

Honeycombe was born in Karachi, in British India. He was educated at the Edinburgh Academy and read English at University College, Oxford. He completed National Service with the Royal Artillery, mainly in Hong Kong, where he was also an announcer with Radio Hong Kong. Returning to the UK, he embarked on an acting career which led to television and public prominence as a national newscaster with ITN.

He later settled in Perth, Western Australia, where he continued to work in radio, television and theatre, and was regularly engaged in voice-over work for radio and television, and in documentary narrations.

== Career ==
Honeycombe joined the Royal Shakespeare Company, working from 1962 to 1964 as an actor at Stratford-upon-Avon and at the Aldwych Theatre, London. From 1965 to 1977 at ITN, he became nationally known as a newscaster. He was twice voted the most popular newscaster in Britain, by readers of the Daily Mirror and of The Sun. From 1977 to 1984, he concentrated on writing, while continuing many other activities, such as presenting television shows for Scottish Television, Southern Television and for the BBC. He returned to regular newsreading from 1984 to 1989 as chief newsreader at TV-am. He was voted the most popular male TV newscaster by readers of Woman's Own magazine in 1986, and received the Television and Radio Industries Club Newscaster of the Year Award in 1989.

While appearing on British television, he also recorded voice-overs or narrations of many television and other documentaries, and was involved in various training films, industrial presentations, conferences, in-house videos and fund-raising charity events. He produced and directed his own play The Redemption for the Festival of Perth in Western Australia, in March 1990, and settled in that area.

=== Film ===
- Blood of the Vampire (1958) – Stretcher Bearer (uncredited)
- Ransom (1974) – newsreader (uncredited)
- The Medusa Touch (1978) – TV Newscaster
- Castaway (1986) – TV Newscaster
- The Fourth Protocol (1987) – TV Announcer
- Bullseye! (1990) – TV Announcer
- Let's Get Skase (2001) – Murray Bishop
- The Sculptor (2008) – Gordon
- Then She Was Gone (2010) – Seymour (final film role)

=== Television ===
- Family History (1979)

=== British stage ===
The Physicists in 1963. Aldwych Theatre

- Suspects, in 1989 at Swansea
- Run for Your Wife, in 1990 touring with Les Dawson
- Aladdin in 1989–90 at the Wimbledon Theatre, with Cilla Black
- Aladdin in 1990–91 at the Pavilion Theatre, Bournemouth, with Su Pollard.

=== Australian stage ===
- The Taming of the Shrew

== Works ==
From 1965, as well as his own books, Honeycombe wrote for television, radio, stage and films. One of his best-known books is the horror novel Neither the Sea Nor the Sand. Early in his career, Honeycombe wrote two horror novels, described by horror historian Stefan R Dziemianowicz as "atmospheric modern gothics whose rugged natural northern English settings resonate with their unsparing supernatural horrors."

The first of these novels, Neither the Sea Nor the Sand, tells the story of a woman whose dead lover returns to life. It was followed by Dragon Under the Hill, where a history professor in Northumberland finds himself re-enacting a tragedy that took place in the Viking era. Dziemianowicz said that since Honeycombe's books were published before the horror boom of the 1970s, they have been "greatly overlooked as a result".

=== Fiction books ===
- Neither the Sea Nor the Sand (1969)
- Dragon Under the Hill (1972)
- The Edge of Heaven (1981)

=== Non-fiction books ===
- Adam's Tale (1974) (Note: On the 1970s investigation into Adam Acworth and other officers from New Scotland Yard's Drug Squad, leading to their suspension.)
- Red Watch (1976) (Note: An account of the Worsley Hotel fire.)
- Royal Wedding (1981)
- Nagasaki 1945 (1981) (Note: as editor - authored by Tatsuichirō Akizuki)
- The Murders of the Black Museum (1982)
- The Year of the Princess (1982)
- Selfridges (1984)
- The TV-AM Celebration of the Royal Wedding (1986)
- More Murders of the Black Museum (1995)
- The Complete Murders of the Black Museum (1995)
- Siren Song (1992)

=== Stage and radio dramatisations ===
- The Redemption
- Lancelot and Guinevere
- Paradise Lost

=== Television plays ===
- The Golden Vision (BBC1, 1968),
- Time and Again (Westward Television, 1974)
- The Professionals (TV Series), (1980) Episode: "Weekend in the Country" , Season 4 - News Announcer.
- The Thirteenth Day of Christmas (Granada Television, 1985)

=== Musical adaptation ===
- The Princess and the Goblins (both book and lyrics: staged in 1994)

== Personal life ==
Honeycombe was a freemason under the United Grand Lodge of England, initiated in 1959 in the Apollo University Lodge No 357 (Oxford).

He had a keen interest in his family history, carrying out research as well as organising extended family gatherings. Nonetheless, he did not marry, and had no children.

Honeycombe died on 9 October 2015, following a long period of illness. He was 79 years old.
