= Wally Wallington =

American experimental archaeologist

- Occupation: Retired construction worker
- Known for: Construction techniques
- Notable work: Stonehenge replica

Wally Wallington is a retired construction worker from Lapeer County, Michigan, USA, who has demonstrated methods for a single person to achieve the construction and manipulation of massive monoliths.

== Work ==
He has constructed a concrete Stonehenge-like structure using only materials and techniques that do not rely on any modern machine-powered technology. He has demonstrated this technique on the Canadian science television program Daily Planet and also for the Discovery Channel.

== Technique ==
His technique uses simple machines such as levers aided by counterweights and pivots. He says that he has successfully singlehandedly "walked" a twenty-ton barn and multi-thousand-pound concrete blocks using a beam lever and two pivots beneath the object and near the center of mass. These techniques might be comparable to those used by Edward Leedskalnin when he had single-handedly constructed his massive Coral Castle in Florida.
