= Worsley Hotel fire =

Arson fire at a hotel in Maida Vale

- Date: 13 December 1974
- Venue: Worsley Hotel
- Location: Maida Vale, London; 51°31′25.5″N 0°10′57.5″W
- Type: Fire
- Deaths: 6 civilians; 1 firefighter

The Worsley Hotel Fire was a major arson fire at the Worsley Hotel in Maida Vale, London on 13 December 1974. It killed seven people, including a probationary firefighter.

== Hotel ==
The Worsley Hotel was a series of interconnecting houses of four or five storeys comprising Nos 3-19 Clifton Gardens, Maida Vale, London W9, a road of Edwardian houses between Warwick Avenue and Maida Vale, London. At the time of the fire, it was used by the hotel industry to house hotel and catering employees, many of whom were of foreign origin and working or training in hotels in Central London.

== Fire ==
In the early hours of Friday 13 December 1974, (as it turned out) two fires were deliberately lit in the hotel. Several occupants were roused by the smell of smoke, and on discovering fire raised the alarm as best they could, before leaving the building. One resident tried to extinguish one of these fires while it was still small, but he did not know how to operate the fire extinguisher which he found.

The first of several 999 calls were made to the London Fire Brigade at 03:32 and received by the local fire station, A21, Paddington, who were ordered to the scene along with neighbouring A22, Manchester Square and G26 Belsize, bringing the first attendance of four pumping appliances (two were pumps – P, two were pump escapes – PE, carrying the heavy but stable 50 foot (15m) wheeled escape ladders), a 100 ft (30m) turntable ladder – TL (aerial ladder) and an emergency tender – ET (for the breathing apparatus (BA) sets carried; BA wearing was then still a specialist skill).

On arrival, a chaotic scene greeted the senior officer, a serious fire in progress and numerous persons needing rescue. A priority message was made to control and a "Make pumps 8" message was sent (requesting a further four pumping appliances in addition to the original four) within minutes of first arriving, whilst rescues (the priority) were being made from both the front and rear of the building. Access was impeded by parked cars. Further reinforcements were requested, first to 15 pumps, and then 20, and finally 30 with a further two turntable ladders requested.

During the next hour, the building structure began to deteriorate as floors and roof structures became affected by fire. This was particularly apparent in house numbers 13, 15, and 17, the worst affected. Many of the internal stairways were stone and when heated by the fire and then suddenly cooled by water collapsed making internal movement through the building awkward and potentially hazardous.

Two trapped residents escaped by jumping from high windows: one into the slender topmost branches of a tree, one across a gap onto a fireman's ladder.

As further crews arrived along with increasingly senior officers to direct operations and persons were accounted for, the operation moved from rescue to fighting the fire. Crews took hoses through the doors from the street and off ladders through the windows. One of these fire fighting crews, made up of 3 firemen and a Station Officer, entered a second floor room to search out the seat of the fire. Whilst in the room, several floors above, weakened by the extra load of the partially collapsed roof and of a large water tank, came down on the crew, the devastation seemingly concentrated on that one room. The release of the trapped firemen became the priority, with what proved to be a difficult and protracted rescue operation. One by one, three firemen were released (two with serious burns and one with a serious back injury) before the body of the fourth fireman was found.

The incident was the first major incident dealt with by the control room at Wembley since their computerized mobilising system was commissioned; it had only gone live earlier that week.

The final attendance involved 30 pumping appliances, 3 turntable ladders, 3 emergency tenders and other specialist vehicles such as hose layers for relaying water long distances, including from the nearby Regents Canal at Little Venice. The "stop" message (= "incident under control") was despatched at 08:02 that morning, but damping down and standby attendance went on for some days. The incident proved to be the largest fire in Central London that year, and resulted in one of the largest number of fire brigade bravery commendations from a single incident. Four of the firemen later received awards from the Queen.

== Victims ==
Seven people died in the fire. 25-year-old Fm. Hamish Pettit from Rochester, Kent, who attended the fire with Red Watch A21 Paddington, was declared dead at the scene. The six other dead were residents on upper floors, which the fire had quickly spread to; their bodies were found after the fire was out. These were:

- Fireman Hamish Pettit, London Fire Brigade, aged 25 from Rochester, Kent, UK;
- Patrick Dermitte, waiter, aged 17 from France;
- Wilfredo Lacap, porter, aged 36 from The Philippines;
- Basdeobora Loakanadah, trainee manager, aged 23 from Mauritius;
- John Lloyd, trainee manager, aged 22 from Sway, Hampshire, UK;
- Edward Simpson, porter, aged 64 from the UK;
- Ettore Luigi Vincon, assistant cook, aged 22 from Pinerolo (To), Italy.

== Investigation ==
A kitchen porter, Edward Mansfield, aged 41, was charged at the Old Bailey on 10 July 1975, with three cases of arson (one at the Worsley Hotel on 13 December and two at the Piccadilly Hotel on 19 and 29 December) and the murders of seven people, including a fireman, at the Worsley Hotel. He pleaded not guilty. On 23 July the jury failed to reach the required majority verdict and were discharged. The re-trial of Mansfield at the Old Bailey on the same charges began on 12 November 1975. John Mathew was again the prosecuting counsel. It ended on 1 December. Mansfield was found guilty of the manslaughter of seven people, including Fireman Pettit, and of three charges of arson. He was given a life sentence.

== First responders ==
The breathing apparatus widely used at the incident was the Siebe Gorman Proto industrial oxygen rebreather. This was a one-hour closed circuit constant flow unit consisting of a breathing bag (containing a CO_{2} absorbent material) which hung in front of the wearer, oxygen cylinder (sat horizontally across the small of the back), mouthpiece, nose clip, and separate eyes-only goggles. It was successfully used for many years by the UK fire service, but could be hot in use and was complex to use and service. On near exhaustion of the oxygen supply, a whistle sounded to tell the wearer that he had only a few minutes supply left. At the time in the London Fire Brigade and other UK authorities, the wearing of BA was restricted to a number of trained and generally more senior fire-fighters.

A number of open circuit compressed air breathing apparatus sets were also used, the Siebe Gorman Airmaster carried on some pumping appliances. These represent the type used in the UK fire service and others worldwide today. The set comprises a large cylinder charged with compressed air, linked to a demand valve combined into the face mask, secured with straps around the head. This type of BA set was simpler to use and service and rather than re-cycling the breathed air, discharged it directly to atmosphere, with a typical duration of 45 minutes.

This is a summary of the fire appliances (fire engines) as they were despatched to the scene. A "Make Pumps..." call in the UK fire service is a request for further reinforcements. All times quoted are in the 24-hour clock format.

Initial Attendance TOC (Time of Call) 03:32

- A21 Paddington: Pump Escape (PE), Pump (P), Turntable Ladder (TL), Emergency Tender (ET);
- A22 Manchester Square: PE;
- G26 Belsize: P.

Make Pumps 8 TOC 03:35

- A29 North Kensington: PE;
- C27 Clerkenwell: ET;
- G24 Hendon: Hose Laying Lorry (HLL);
- G26 Belsize: PE;
- G25 West Hampstead: PE P;
- A Division Breathing Apparatus Control Van (based at Paddington Fire Station);
- Headquarters Control Unit (based at Lambeth Fire Station).

Make Pumps 15 TOC 03:41

- A28 Kensington: PE;
- A24 Soho: PE P;
- A25 Westminster: PE P;
- C27 Clerkenwell: PE P.

Make TL 3 TOC 03:46

- A28 Kensington: TL;
- B22 Lambeth: TL.

Make Pumps 20 TOC 04:06

- A26 Knightsbridge: P;
- A28 Kensington: P (diverted from Paddington);
- C30 Holloway: P;
- D24 Fulham P;
- G28 Willesden: P.

Make Pumps 30 TOC 04:15

- A27 Chelsea: P;
- B22 Lambeth: PE P;
- C25 Cannon Street: PE P;
- C28 Islington: PE P;
- D22 Acton: P (ordered on by radio en route to Paddington);
- D23 Hammersmith: P;
- G24 Hendon: P.

Eight further pumps were requested at 05:56 to relieve the initial crews and to assist in damping down operations. As was the practice, the fire was also attended by the London Salvage Corps, whose principal task was damage control and to limit damage to property. This insurance industry funded organisation was abolished in 1984.

All fire station codes quoted were those in use in 1974. Some codes have subsequently changed and some stations have since closed.

== Aftermath ==
The building was re-built after the fire as flats, and still stands today although the buildings are now known as "Connaught House". A blue plaque is attached to the wall of No 9, commemorating the connection with pioneer electrical engineer Ambrose Fleming.

Having struck up a friendship with the Station Officer of Paddington Fire Station, TV Newsreader Gordon Honeycombe wrote an account of the fire, named Red Watch after one of the colour coded shift designators used in the UK Fire Service. The book, first published in 1976 centres on the local fire station at Paddington, giving an account of the days leading up to the fire. The reader follows the crews through their working routines, and the working practices and terminology are introduced. The fire is described in detail, based on the accounts of the fire brigade personnel who were present on the night. As one of the most informative accounts of work in the UK Fire Service at that time, it has remained in print.

== Notes and references ==
- Red Watch, a book by Gordon Honeycombe, publ. 1976, 1977, revised in 1985, ISBN 0-09-914230-9
