= Arthur Reginald Dyer =

English firefighter

Arthur Reginald Dyer (11 May 1877 - 4 May 1951) was a fire officer who from 1918 to 1933 held the post of Chief Officer of the London Fire Brigade.

== Life ==
Born in Alton, Hampshire to Louisa Susannah Dowling and her builder-surveyor husband John Herbert Dyer, he attended Dane Hill House, a private boarding school in Cliftonville, Kent. He joined the London Fire Brigade around 1902. By 1911 he was already a Divisional Officer within it, stationed at Euston and living on Euston Square.

There were 118 applications for the post of Chief Officer in 1918, with Dyer, Aylmer Firebrace and Captain William Reginald Denys Crowther RN in the final three. Dyer had been Acting Chief Officer for a time and his selection for the role itself was recommended by the General Purposes Committee to London County Council at its meeting on 3 June 1919. In 1933 he retired to St Leonard's-on-Sea, where he died.
