= James de Courcy Hamilton =

British Royal Navy officer and fire officer (1860-1936)

Rear-Admiral James de Courcy Hamilton MVO
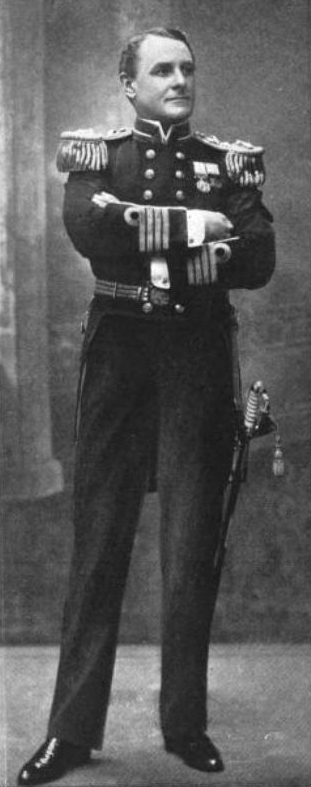
- In The Sketch, 5 August 1903
- Born: 1 February 1860
- Died: 24 February 1936 (aged 76); London, England
- Resting place: Golders Green
- Occupations: Military officer, fire officer
- Spouse: Mabel Sang (m. 1901)
- Children: William Evelyn de Courcy Hamilton

Rear-Admiral James de Courcy Hamilton MVO (1 February 1860 – 24 February 1936) was a British Royal Navy officer and fire officer. He was the Chief Officer of the London Fire Brigade from 1903 to 1909.

== Biography ==
Hamilton joined the Royal Navy in 1873, and was promoted to commander on 31 December 1895, and to captain on 1 January 1901. After he retired from the navy, he served as Chief Officer of the London Fire Brigade from 1903 to 1909, and for his service was appointed a Member of the Royal Victorian Order 4th class (MVO) on 19 July 1909.

Hamilton was promoted to rear-admiral on the Retired list on 22 July 1910.

He married Mabel Sang in 1901, and they had a son, William Evelyn de Courcy Hamilton, in late 1902.

James de Courcy Hamilton died at his home in London on 24 February 1936, and was cremated at Golders Green.
