= Ron Dobson =

British fire commissioner

Ron Dobson CBE QFSM FIFireE

Commissioner of the London Fire Brigade
- In office 1 October 2007 – 31 December 2016
- Preceded by: Ken Knight
- Succeeded by: Dany Cotton

Personal details
- Born: Ronald James Dobson United Kingdom
- Occupation: Fire fighter

Ronald James Dobson, CBE, QFSM, FIFireE is a retired senior British firefighter. He was the chief fire officer of the London Fire Brigade until 31 December 2016.

== Career ==
Dobson joined the London Fire Brigade in 1979 and rose through the ranks to be promoted Assistant Chief Fire Officer in 2000. In 2002, he became the principal officer responsible for delivering the Brigade's day-to-day operations.

On 1 October 2007, he was appointed Commissioner for Fire and Emergency Planning at the London Fire and Emergency Planning Authority, succeeding Sir Ken Knight. He was responsible for the world's third largest fire and rescue service with 112 fire stations and 7000 staff, 6000 of whom are operational firefighters. Until his promotion to Chief Fire Officer, he was responsible for operational policy and training. The title is generally shortened to commissioner – the most senior officer of the LFEPA, but the role includes all the functions of a Chief Fire Officer or Brigade Manager in a local authority fire and rescue service.

== Honours ==
Dobson was awarded the Queen's Fire Service Medal (QFSM) in the 2005 New Year Honours for "distinguished service". He was appointed Commander of the Order of the British Empire (CBE) in the 2011 New Year Honours. He is a recipient of the Queen Elizabeth II Golden Jubilee Medal, the Queen Elizabeth II Diamond Jubilee Medal and the Fire Brigade Long Service and Good Conduct Medal.

Ribbon	Description	Notes
	Order of the British Empire (CBE)	2011
	Queen's Fire Service Medal (QFSM)	2005
	Queen Elizabeth II Golden Jubilee Medal	2002; UK Version of this Medal
	Queen Elizabeth II Diamond Jubilee Medal	2012; UK Version of this Medal
	Fire Brigade Long Service and Good Conduct Medal	

== See also ==
- London Fire Brigade
- Chief Fire Officer
- London Fire and Emergency Planning Authority
- Chief Fire Officers Association

Fire appointments
Preceded by Sir Ken Knight	Commissioner for Fire and Emergency Planning; 2007 – 2016	Incumbent
