= Andy Roe, Baron Roe of West Wickham =

Former British Army officer and firefighter (born 1974)

The Right Honourable The Lord Roe of West Wickham KFSM
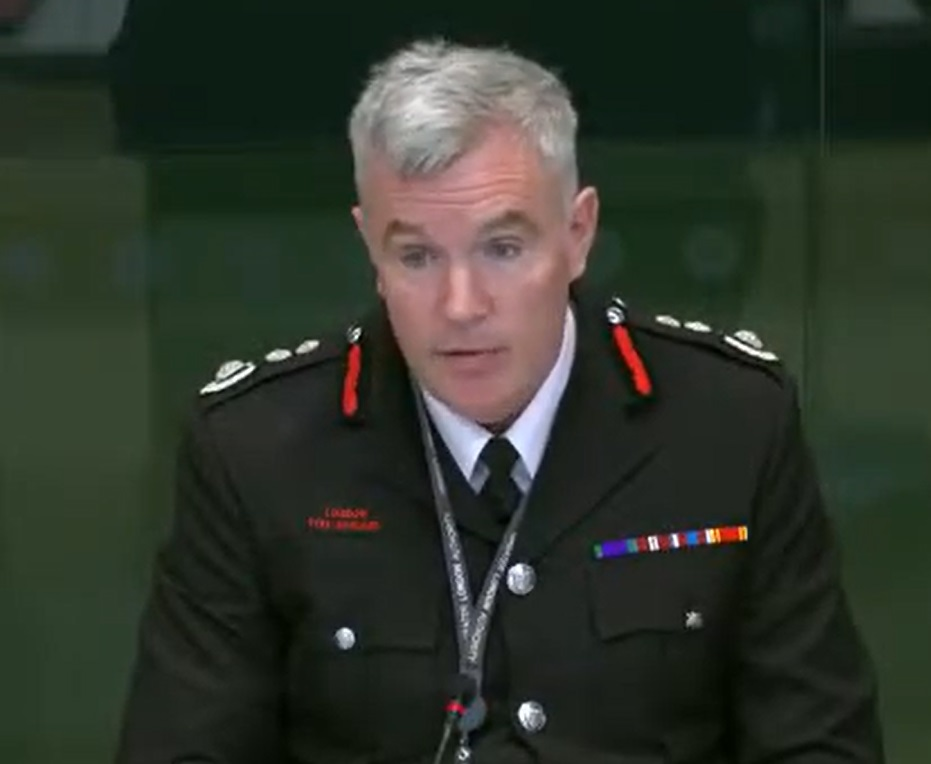
- Commissioner Roe being questioned by the London Assembly in 2022

Commissioner of the London Fire Brigade
- In office January 2020 – June 2025
- Preceded by: Dany Cotton
- Succeeded by: Jonathan Smith

Member of the House of Lords
- Lord Temporal
- Life peerage 13 January 2026

Personal details
- Born: July 1974 (age 52)
- Party: Labour
- Education: Newcastle University (BA)
- Profession: Military officer and firefighter

Military service
- Allegiance: United Kingdom
- Branch/service: British Army
- Years of service: 1996–2000
- Rank: Captain
- Unit: 12th Regiment Royal Artillery

Andrew Dudley Roe, Baron Roe of West Wickham KFSM (born July 1974) is a former British Army officer and former Commissioner of the London Fire Brigade.

== Early life and education ==
Andy Roe grew up in London and graduated from Newcastle University in 1995 with a Bachelor of Arts in English literature.

== Career ==
In 1997, Roe was commissioned from the Royal Military Academy Sandhurst and joined the 12th Regiment Royal Artillery as a second lieutenant. During his time as an officer, he served as a troop commander and a battery captain and served two tours in Northern Ireland. During his time in Northern Ireland, he was wounded when a pipe bomb was thrown at him, which also severely injured an RUC officer stood next to Roe. The officer died after spending four weeks on a life support machine. As a captain, he transferred his commission to the Army reserve in April 2000.

In 2002, Roe joined the London Fire Brigade as a firefighter and in January 2017 was appointed as Assistant Commissioner.

During the Grenfell Tower fire, Roe was appointed incident commander where he revoked the controversial 'stay put' advice to the residents. As the first commissioner appointed since the fire, Roe issued a plea to the residents of London's 7,000 high rise blocks to set aside any 'post-Grenfell doubts continue to follow firefighters’ advice in the event of a blaze.'

On 28 January 2020, Roe became the first LFB commissioner to sign the Armed Forces Covenant with the British Armed Forces.

Roe was awarded the King's Fire Service Medal (KFSM) in the 2024 New Year Honours.

Roe resigned as the Commissioner for the London Fire Brigade on 30 June 2025 after 23 years of service as a firefighter. Following his resignation from the LFB, Roe was named the non-executive chair of a newly formed shadow board within the Building Safety Regulator. He was nominated for a life peerage as part of the 2025 Political Peerages and he was created Baron Roe of West Wickham, of West Wickham in the London Borough of Bromley on 13 January 2026.

== Awards and honours ==

Ribbon	Description	Notes
	King's Fire Service Medal (KFSM)	2024 New Year Honours
	General Service Medal (1962)	For Service in Northern Ireland
	Queen Elizabeth II Diamond Jubilee Medal	2012; UK Version of this Medal
	Queen Elizabeth II Platinum Jubilee Medal	2022; UK Version of this Medal
	King Charles III Coronation Medal	2023; UK Version of this Medal
	Fire and Rescue Service Long Service and Good Conduct Medal	2022

== See also ==
- London Fire Brigade
- Chief Fire Officer
- London Fire and Emergency Planning Authority
- Chief Fire Officers Association

Fire appointments
Preceded by Dany Cotton	Commissioner of London Fire Brigade; 2020 – 2025	Succeeded by Jonathan Smith
