= Dany Cotton =

Retired British firefighter (born 1969)

Dany Cotton QFSM
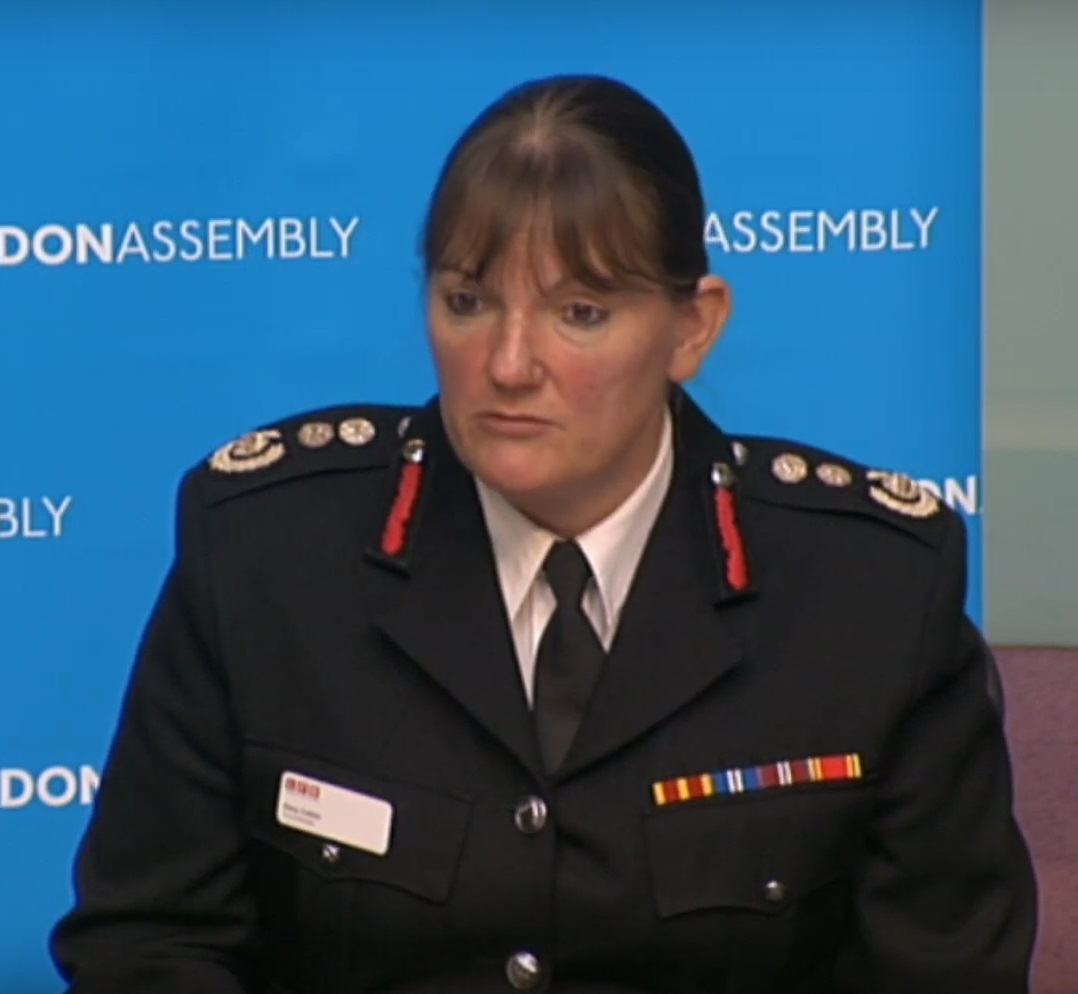
- Commissioner Cotton being questioned by the London Assembly in 2019

Commissioner of the London Fire Brigade
- In office 1 January 2017 – 31 December 2019
- Preceded by: Ron Dobson
- Succeeded by: Andy Roe

Personal details
- Born: 11 June 1969 (age 56) London, United Kingdom
- Occupation: Firefighter

Danielle Amara Cotton, QFSM (born 11 June 1969) is a British retired firefighter. From 2017 to 2019, she served as the commissioner of the London Fire Brigade and was the first woman to hold this position. She had previously been the director of safety and assurance at the London Fire Brigade.

In 2004 Cotton became the first woman to be awarded the Queen's Fire Service Medal. She is the Patron of Women in the Fire Service UK.

== Early life ==
Cotton was born on 11 June 1969 in London. As a teenager she was a member of the Air Training Corps.

== Career ==
Cotton joined London Fire Brigade in 1988, and her first placement was at Wimbledon Fire Station. Aged 19, she had been a full firefighter for just three months when she attended the Clapham Junction rail crash. In 2007, she was assigned the post of Area Commander, becoming the highest-ranking woman in the British Fire Service, and in 2012 was made Assistant Chief Officer.

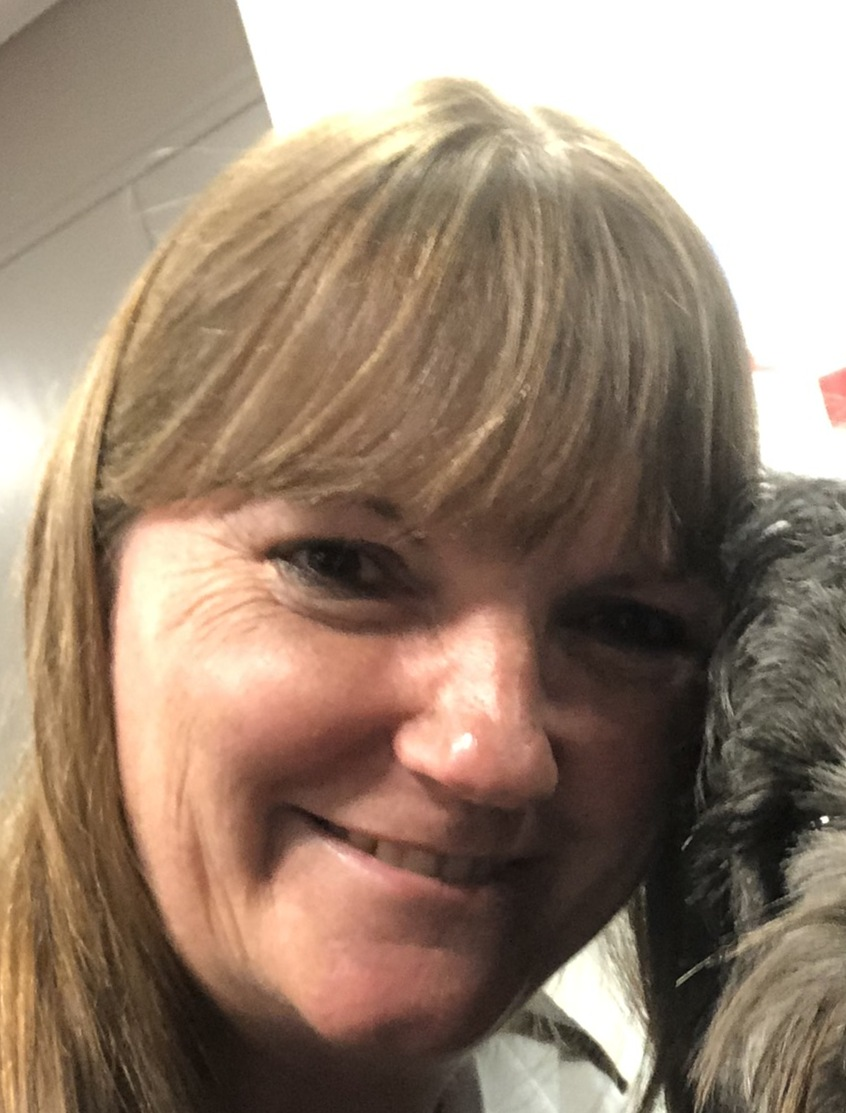
Cotton in 2018

In September 2016, Cotton was appointed interim commissioner of the London Fire Brigade following the retirement of Ron Dobson. She took up the position on 1 January 2017. Cotton initially held the title of interim commissioner until a restructure of the brigade later in 2017, at which point she became full commissioner. Commenting on the appointment of Dany Cotton as the London fire commissioner, Young Women's Trust chief executive Dr Carole Easton said: "It's great to see a woman appointed to the top job in the London Fire Brigade. It is so important that young women who are considering which career path to choose have role models in all workplaces to inspire them. The fire service has typically been dominated by men. Hopefully this appointment will encourage more young women into the London Fire Brigade".

In October 2017 she highlighted Fireman Sam in a campaign fighting sexism and promoting the gender-neutral term firefighter. She proposed that the children's character should be renamed Firefighter Sam. Cotton said that research showed that women are put off a career in the fire service because it is seen as a job for men, and that as Fireman Sam is seen by children from an early age, the name reinforces this stereotype.

=== Grenfell Tower fire ===
On 14 June 2017, Cotton was called out in the middle of the night to take charge of the London Fire Brigade's response to the massive Grenfell Tower fire, which she described as "an unprecedented incident." She appeared at several media briefings to give updates on casualty figures, challenges faced and firefighters' progress.

In October 2019 the retired high court judge Sir Martin Moore-Bick, who led the Grenfell Tower Inquiry, was critical of Cotton's "remarkable insensitivity" for stating in her evidence that she would not change anything the London Fire Brigade did on the night of the Grenfell fire. His report demonstrated "the LFB is an institution at risk of not learning the lessons of the Grenfell Tower fire". Survivors and bereaved welcomed Moore-Bick's comments in the first of his two reports. On 3 November 2019, The Sunday Times reported that Dany Cotton rejected the findings of the Moore-Bick inquiry into the Grenfell fire, calling them a 'stitch up'. The paper reported that her comments had angered survivors.

Following public criticism from survivors and families of victims of the Grenfell tower fire, Cotton announced 6 December 2019 that she had brought forward her date of retirement to the end of December 2019. Her replacement from 1 January 2020 was Deputy Commissioner Andrew Roe.

Cotton gave evidence to the Grenfell Inquiry for a second time in November 2020.

=== Retirement ===
On 20 June 2019, she announced she would retire in April 2020 after serving 32 years (two years longer than a normal firefighter's service) from the London Fire Brigade.

== Honours and awards ==
In 2002, Cotton was named Outstanding Public Servant of the year. In the 2004 New Year Honours, Cotton became the first woman to be awarded the Queen's Fire Service Medal, given "for distinguished service." On 30 October 2008, she was awarded the Fire Brigade Long Service and Good Conduct Medal.

In 2010, she was named by The Independent as one of "100 women who changed the world". In 2014, she won the Public Service Category of the First Women Awards.

Ribbon	Description	Notes
	Queen's Fire Service Medal (QFSM)	2004
	Queen Elizabeth II Golden Jubilee Medal	2002; UK Version of this Medal
	Queen Elizabeth II Diamond Jubilee Medal	2012; UK Version of this Medal
	Fire Brigade Long Service and Good Conduct Medal	October 2008

== See also ==
- London Fire Brigade
- Chief Fire Officer
- London Fire and Emergency Planning Authority
- Chief Fire Officers Association

Fire appointments
Preceded by Ron Dobson	Commissioner of London Fire Brigade; 2017 – 2019	Succeeded by Andrew Roe
