= Ken Knight =

Former London Fire Commissioner

Sir Ken Knight CBE QFSM DL
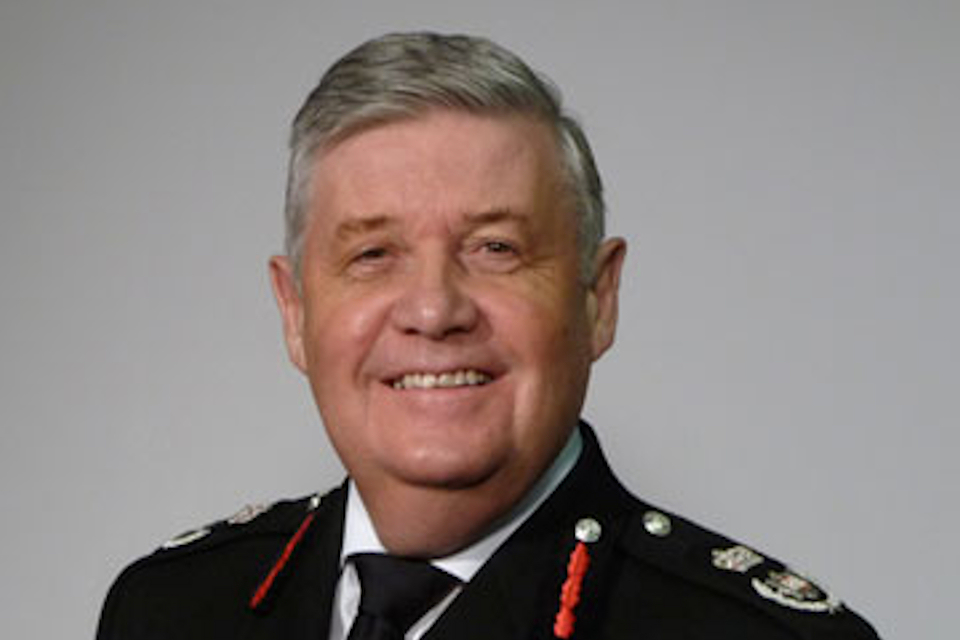

Chief Fire and Rescue Adviser for England
- In office 2007–2013
- Preceded by: New appointment
- Succeeded by: Peter Holland

Commissioner of the London Fire Brigade
- In office 2003–2007
- Preceded by: Brian Robinson
- Succeeded by: Ron Dobson

Personal details
- Born: Kenneth John Knight; 3 January 1947 (age 79)
- Citizenship: United Kingdom

Sir Kenneth John Knight, CBE, QFSM, DL (born 3 January 1947) is a retired British firefighter and public servant. From 2003 to 2007, he was the Commissioner of the London Fire Brigade and Commissioner for the London Fire and Emergency Planning Authority. From 2007 to 2013, he was the Chief Fire and Rescue Adviser for England.

== Biography ==
=== Fire service career ===
Knight started work at Westminster Bank in Reigate (1964-1966). He commenced his fire service career as a firefighter in 1966 and subsequently served in a number of UK fire brigades. He was appointed as Chief Fire Officer of Dorset Fire and Rescue Service (1994-1998) and West Midlands Fire Service (1998-2003), before becoming London’s Fire Commissioner in 2003. In 2007 he was appointed as the Government's Chief Fire and Rescue Adviser for England based at the Department for Communities and Local Government.

As the Chief Fire and Rescue Adviser for England (2007-2013), Knight was responsible for advising ministers and senior officials on fire policy matters and for providing advice during major and catastrophic emergencies together with operational advice on preparedness and response during the 2012 London Olympics. He was also responsible for the enforcement of fire safety regulations in Crown Premises in England.

He produced an independent report for the UK Government on fire and rescue services response to the widespread flooding in 2007 entitled Facing the Challenge. He was also tasked by the Secretary of State to undertake a review in the immediate aftermath of the fire in high rise flats at Lakanal House, London, 2009 in which six people died however, when further cladding risks were reported to the Department for Communities and Local Government in 2009 Sir Ken Knight, replied to say there was "insufficient information to warrant alerting housing authorities", the Grenfell inquiry was told.

In May 2013 Knight published an efficiencies review of the 46 Fire and Rescue Authorities, Facing the Future, which had been commissioned by the UK Government.

=== Independent consultancy ===
Since leaving his position as the Chief Fire and Rescue Adviser to the UK Government in 2013, Knight has provided independent consultancy advice to public and private sector organisations.

From 2014 to 2017 Knight served as the Lead Commissioner for the London Borough of Tower Hamlets under the Local Government Act 1999.

From 2016-17, the Department for Business, Innovation and Skills commissioned Knight to make recommendations regarding the introduction of electronic balloting for industrial action.

Since June 2017, Knight has been chair of the Independent Expert Advisory Panel at the Ministry of Housing, Communities and Local Government in the immediate aftermath of London's Grenfell Tower fire, in which 71 people lost their lives. His role was to provide advice to officials and Ministers on action to be taken in high rise buildings following the fire.

Knight has also completed reviews of the fire and rescue services in Southern Ireland, Bermuda and Gibraltar, and undertook a review of the national fire safety and civil defence arrangements in the Kurdistan Region of Iraq at the request of the Kurdish government.

== Honours ==
Knight was awarded the Queen's Fire Service Medal in 1991 and a CBE in the 2001 Birthday Honours. He was appointed as Her Majesty’s Representative Deputy Lieutenant for Richmond upon Thames (2017-2017), and has been a Deputy Lieutenant for Greater London since 2007.

Knight was knighted in the 2006 Birthday Honours in recognition of his outstanding contribution to the fire and rescue service.

Knight is a Companion of the Chartered Management Institute and a Fellow of the Institution of Fire Engineers. He was a founder Trustee of the UK Firefighters Memorial Trust and is a past Master of the Worshipful Company of Firefighters (1998).

== See also ==
- Fire Service in the United Kingdom
- Chief Fire Officers Association
- Chief Fire Officer
