= Fire and Rescue Service Long Service and Good Conduct Medal =

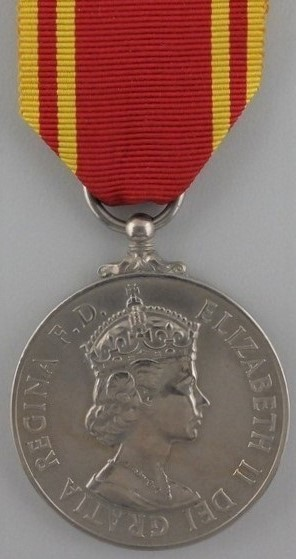
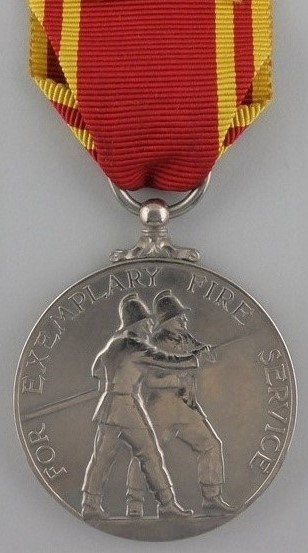
- Obverse and reverse of the pre 2022 updated Medal
- Type: Long Service and Good Conduct Medal
- Awarded for: 20 years of long and meritorious full-time or part-time service
- Presented by: the United Kingdom
- Eligibility: United Kingdom, Isle of Man and Channel Islands fire brigade personnel
- Clasps: 30 and 40 Years Service Clasp
- Status: Currently awarded
- Established: 1 June 1954
- Ribbon of the medal

Order of Wear
- Next (higher): Police Long Service and Good Conduct Medal
- Next (lower): African Police Medal for Meritorious Service

The Fire and Rescue Service Long Service and Good Conduct Medal was established in June 1954 as a long service medal awarded to members of fire and rescue services throughout the United Kingdom, the Isle of Man and the Channel Islands. It was first designated The Fire Brigade Long Service and Good Conduct Medal and subsequently renamed in 2022 following an updated royal warrant. The medal is awarded for 20 years of good and efficient service.

== Appearance ==
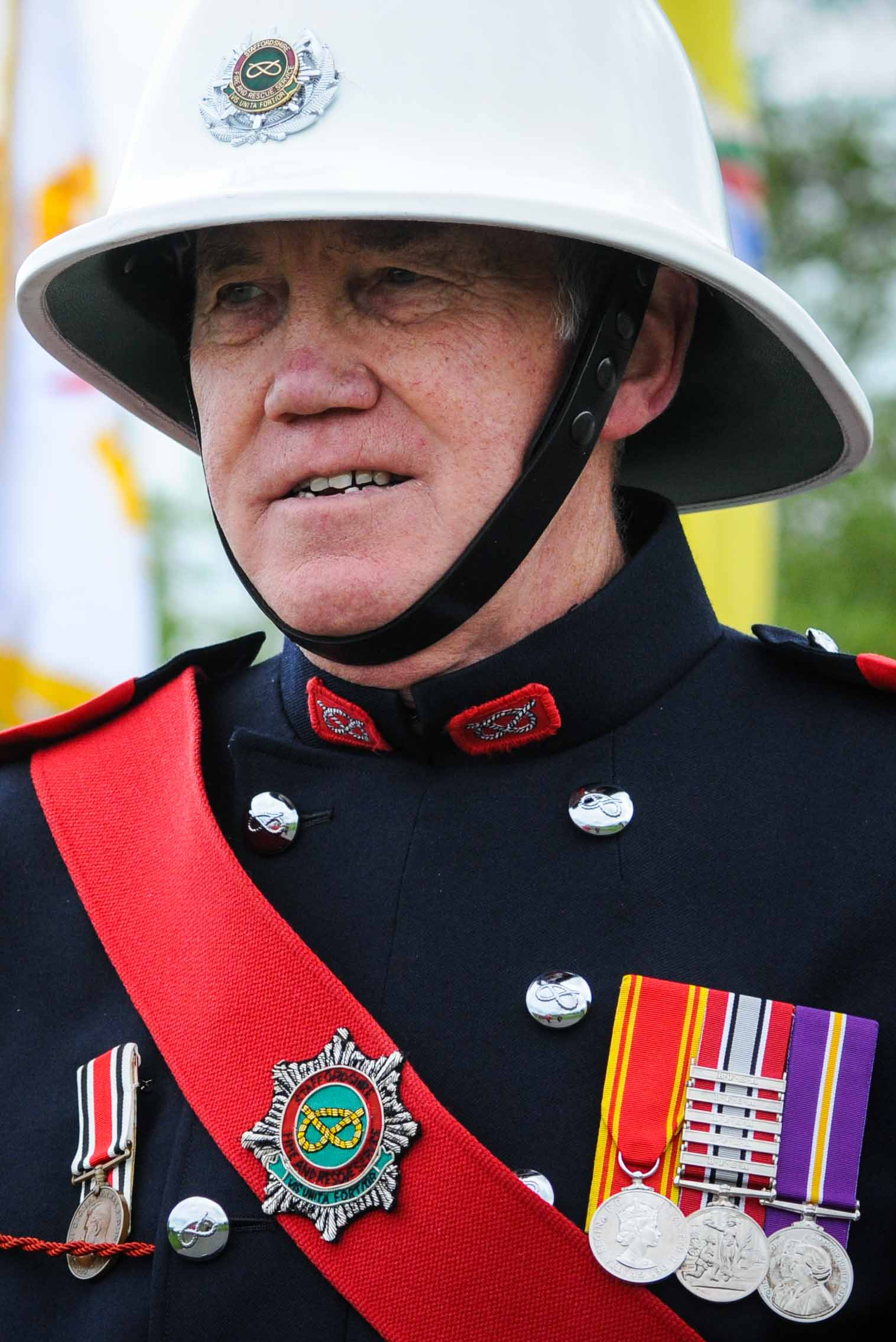
A member of the Staffordshire Fire and Rescue Service's Ceremonial Squad, wearing his Long Service and Good Conduct Medal

The Award is in cupronickel, in the form of a circular Medal, bearing on the obverse the Crown Effigy of the Sovereign and on the reverse the inscription "For Exemplary Fire and Rescue Service" with a design showing two firefighters handling a hose.

The Thirty Years of Service Clasp and the Forty Years of Service Clasp are in cupronickel bearing the inscription “Long Service, Thirty Years” and “Long Service, Forty Years” respectively.

The Medal is to be worn on the left side attached by means of a suspending bar to a ribbon one and a quarter inches in width, which is in colour red, with on either side a yellow stripe on which is superimposed a narrow stripe of red. The Thirty Years of Service Clasp and the Forty Years of Service Clasp are to be attached to the ribbon.

== Criteria ==
=== Eligibility ===
Those eligible for the Fire and Rescue Service Long Service and Good Conduct Medal are full-time and part-time members of all ranks in Local Authority Fire Services in England and Wales, the Scottish Fire and Rescue Service, the Northern Ireland Fire and Rescue Service, or Airport Fire Services. Also eligible are members of Fire Brigades of the Isle of Man and the Channel Islands, Fire Service members of CFRA and of Her Majesty's Fire Service Inspectorate for Scotland and fire service instructors at central training establishments such as the Fire Service College, the Scottish Fire Services College, and the Defence Fire Training and Development Centre.

=== Length of service ===
Individuals may be awarded the medal for 20 years of continuous or aggregate service in an eligible fire brigade or service, so long as they have been very good in conduct and character.

=== Clasps ===
In March 2022, the Royal Warrant was updated by Queen Elizabeth II to grant clasps to officers who completed a further 10 and 20 years of long service post award of the medal. This change reflected the longer service of Fire and Rescue Service Officers following pension changes and sought to recognise their extended service. The two clasps are in cupronickel, and bear the inscription below:

- 'Long Service, 30 Years'
- 'Long Service, 40 Years'

== See also ==
- Fire Services Exemplary Service Medal, awarded to members of Canadian fire services
- National Medal, awarded to members of Australian fire brigades
- New Zealand Fire Brigades Long Service and Good Conduct Medal
