= Casualties Union =

British charity founded by Eric Claxton

Casualties Union, is a British registered charity (1200120) that was founded on 22 November 1942 by Eric Claxton OBE who later received an OBE for his services to civil defence.

The services of the charity were born out from the need to provide realistic training for the rescue personnel of local authorities in the rescue, assessment and treatment of casualties in the 1940s. In 2010, its members contributed 27,953 hours, providing their services as trained make-up artists and actors in casualty simulation.

== History ==
=== 1942–1970 ===
Casualties Union evolved from the Surrey County Civil Defence Rescue School (SCCDRS), which was set up in 1940 to aid rescue operations after World War II bombings.

During World War II all members of Casualties Union were also members of the Civil Defence, but after the dissolution of the Civil Defence and subsequently the SCCDRS in 1945, the necessity of Casualties Union came into question. However, medical advisers urged Casualties Union to continue to serve the needs of peacetime first aid training, and a dedicated nucleus of about 100 volunteers continued to develop make-up and acting techniques for use in peacetime first-aid training.

== Involvement ==
Since inception, the Casualties Union have provided trained members to participate, as casualties, in duties that test Emergency management plans such as:

- Multi-agency and government exercises
- Fire brigade training and events
- Airport licensing and recertification exercises
- First aid training and competitions
- School and driver awareness days
- TV, film, documentary and training videos
- Hospital and ambulance service training and exercises
- Other transport providers (such as rail transport companies, race tracks) training days
- Education and course simulations or scenarios
