= CFOA =

CFOA may refer to the following:

- Chemins de Fer Ottomans d'Anatolie - An Ottoman railway company.
- Chief Fire Officers Association
- Certified Futures and Options Analyst - A financial professional certification.
