= Independent Review of the Fire Service =

2002 report on United Kingdom's Fire Service

The Independent Review of the Fire Service, sometimes referred to as the Bain Report or IRFS was a wide-ranging independent review carried out by Professor Sir George Bain, in 2002, at the request of the government, into the how Fire and Rescue Services were operated and managed; and about the working conditions of firefighters in the UK. When the report was completed, its full title was The Future of the Fire Service: reducing risk, saving lives - The Independent Review of the Fire Service , although it is generally known by the shortened name (including the online version). On publication, its authors said the report: "sets out our recommendations for how the service should change in the future to meet the demands of the twenty-first century." The report prompted a prolonged period of industrial action in the UK by firefighters, the first national strike since 1977. The Bain report made several recommendations, that led to wide ranging changes in the approach to fire and rescue authorities (FRS) in the UK. It was controversial because of its extensive scope, and in 2006, many changes to UK FRS continue as a direct result of it.

== Report authors ==
The review consisted of three members, chaired by Bain. Their credentials are described below, when the report was published in 2002. The IRFS took three months to complete, the first firefighter strikes were in November, just before the IRFS was published.

- Professor Sir George Bain, President and Vice-Chancellor, Queen's University Belfast
- Professor Sir Michael Lyons, Director, INLOGOV and Professor of Public Policy, University of Birmingham. In 2007 he was appointed as chair of the BBC Trust
- Sir Anthony Young, Trade Union Liaison Officer, Ethical Trading Initiative; and lately President of the Trades Union Congress

== Scope of the IRFS ==
- The role of the fire service today
- The future role of the fire service
- Risk and community fire safety
- Role of central and local government
- Implementation and management policy
- Pay, pensions, conditions of service
- Retained firefighters
- Implementing reform

== Implications of the IRFS ==
The IRFS had the effect of changing firefighters pay and conditions, and created a massive structural change to the fire service in the UK. It prompted a white paper that led to a change in the primary legislation for the operation of FRS.

== See also ==
- Fire service in the United Kingdom
- UK Firefighter dispute 2002/2003
- Operation Fresco
- Fire Brigades Union
- Chief Fire Officers Association
- Fire Service College
