= King's Ambulance Service Medal =

- Ribbon of the medal
- Type: Medal
- Awarded for: "...devotion to duty over a prolonged period in the NHS Ambulance Service as shall have been of particular value to ... said Services and constituted an outstanding example to others".
- Presented by: United Kingdom
- Eligibility: Members of the NHS Ambulance Service in the United Kingdom, Isle of Man or Channel Islands
- Post-nominals: KAM (2022-Present); QAM (2011-2022)
- Status: Currently awarded
- Established: 11 July 2011
- First award: 2012 Birthday Honours

Precedence
- Next (higher): King's Fire Service Medal
- Next (lower): King's Volunteer Reserves Medal
- Related: King's Police Medal; King's Fire Service Medal

The King's Ambulance Service Medal, formerly the Queen's Ambulance Service Medal, officially The King’s Ambulance Service Medal for Distinguished Service, is awarded to members of the NHS Ambulance Service (and equivalents) in the United Kingdom, Isle of Man and Channel Islands for distinguished service. It was introduced on 11 July 2011 and first awarded during the 2012 Birthday Honours. Recipients may use the post-nominal letters "KAM" or "QAM" depending on when the award was made.

Awards of the medal are announced in The Gazette.

== Award criteria ==
The UK Department of Health has published guidance on the award of the Medal. Those recommended for the Medal will usually have completed 10 years good conduct and exemplary service, and will have shown distinguished or meritorious service, including service marked by exceptional ability, merit and exemplary conduct. The guidance identifies the following aspects of performance as being particularly important:

- Very high levels of sustained performance while temporary filling posts that would normally attract a higher rank or grade;
- Prolonged service, but only when accompanied by exceptional achievement and merit;
- Completion of a significant piece of work or project that results in substantial improvements for patients and/or staff;
- Taking on additional roles or responsibilities (in addition to their core role) that results in significant improvements for patients and/or staff;
- Taking a leading role in developing IT systems to improve performance and efficiency of the Ambulance Service;
- Taking a significant and prolonged leading role in training and development to promote staff knowledge and skills;
- Success in organising ambulance services under special difficulties, for example, managing major, serious or dangerous operational incidents, which make exceptional demands on personnel;
- Special services to Royalty or Heads of State.

The number of nominations in any one year is not to exceed ten, including up to 4 Medals for England, up to 2 Medals for Wales, up to 2 Medals for Scotland, up to 1 Medal for Northern Ireland, and up to 1 Medal for the Channel Islands and the Isle of Man.

== Design ==
- The circular medal is silver, with the obverse having the crowned effigy of Queen Elizabeth II.
- The medal's reverse is design emblematic of the Ambulance Service. It depicts a rod of Asclepius superimposed over a horizontal chequered band or Battenburg markings in the centre. Above is the rod is the inscription 'FOR DISTINGUISHED' and below is 'AMBULANCE SERVICE'.
- The ribbon is of pale green with a narrow central stripe of silver and narrow silver stripes at either edge.
- The name of the recipient is engraved or stamped around the rim of the medal

== See also ==
- King’s Police Medal
- King’s Fire Service Medal
- British and Commonwealth orders and decorations
