= Commissioner of the London Fire Brigade =

Formerly known as Chief Fire Officer

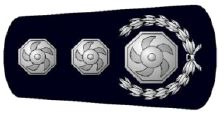
- Incumbent; Jonathan Smith since May 2025
- London Fire Brigade
- Seat: Union Street, SE1
- Appointer: The Monarch

The Commissioner of the London Fire Brigade, previously known as the Chief Fire Officer until c. 2000, is the head of the London Fire Brigade. Jonathan Smith has held the post since May 2025.

The rank is usually referred to as the London Fire Brigade Commissioner, the LFB Commissioner or simply "Commissioner".

== Current Commissioner ==
Jonathan Smith was appointed as the Commissioner for the London Fire Brigade in May 2025, following confirmation by the London Assembly's Fire Committee. He succeeded Andy Roe, who retired after more than two decades of service with the Brigade.

Smith began his firefighting career in 2000 with Norfolk Fire and Rescue Service at Norwich City Fire Station. He later moved to Hertfordshire Fire and Rescue Service in 2008, where he progressed through a series of senior roles. In 2019, he joined London Fire Brigade as an Assistant Commissioner, initially focusing on reforming procedures within Brigade Control, particularly in response to the Grenfell Tower Fire and the recommendations from the subsequent inquiry.

Smith has managed responses to several significant incidents, notably the New Providence Wharf fire in 2021, and acted as the senior operational commander during major events including the funeral of Queen Elizabeth II and the coronation of King Charles III. In addition, he led work on cultural change within the Brigade in the wake of the Culture Review.

== List of London Fire Brigade chief officers and commissioners ==
From	To	Military rank (if applicable)	Name	Notes
1833	1861		James Braidwood	First director of the London Fire Engine Establishment (which later became the London Fire Brigade).
1861	1891	Captain	Eyre Massey Shaw	First Chief Officer of the Metropolitan Fire Brigade.
1891	1896		James Sexton Simmonds	
1896	1903	Captain (RN)	Lionel de Lautour Wells	
1903	1909	Rear Admiral	James de Courcy Hamilton	
1909	1918	Lieutenant Commander	Sir Sampson Sladen	
1918	1933		Arthur Reginald Dyer	
1933	1938	Major	Cyril Morris	Only LFB chief officer to have been awarded the Military Cross
1938	1941	Commander	Sir Aylmer Firebrace	The first and only person to head firefighting across the whole of Great Britain.
1948	1962		Sir Frederick Delve	First chief officer after the end of Fire Brigade nationalisation
1962	1970		Leslie Leete	
1970	1976		Joseph Milner	Director of the Hong Kong Fire Services from 1961 to 1970 before his appointment to the London Fire Brigade
1976	1980		Peter Darby	
1980	1987		Ronald Bullers	
1987	1991		Gerald Clarkson	
1991	2003		Brian Robinson	
2003	2007		Sir Ken Knight	
2007	2016		Ron Dobson	
2016	2019		Dany Cotton	First woman commissioner. Retired earlier than planned due to criticism of LFB handling of fire at Grenfell Tower.
2019	2025	Captain	Andy Roe	
2025	Present		Jonathan Smith	
