= National Fire Chiefs Council =

Logo of the NFCC

The National Fire Chiefs Council (NFCC) is a membership body which represents area managers and above. The Council itself which meets quarterly is made up of the chief fire officers of the fire services in the United Kingdom. It replaced the Fire and Rescue Service Council. The National Fire Chiefs Council is a committee of National Fire Chiefs Council Limited (formerly Chief Fire Officers Association (CFOA) which is a registered charity and company. National Fire Chiefs Council Limited has a board of trustees which ensures appropriate governance and have oversight of the trading activities. Trustees have been selected to represent the range of governance models in place across the FRS: The current chair of NFCC is Phil Garrigan.

== Structure ==
The National Fire Chiefs Council is a committee of National Fire Chiefs Council Limited, which remains the legal entity behind the NFCC. The council meets quarterly and is led by the NFCC chair. Each fire and rescue service is represented on the council, either through their chief fire officer or a nominated deputy, and each service has one vote. Other people may attend meetings as observers.

=== Committees ===
The NFCC operates various Committees:

- COVID Committee (Phil Garrigan, Merseyside)
- Finance (Ben Ansell – Dorset & Wiltshire)
- Operations (Chris Lowther – Tyne & Wear)
- Prevention (Neil Odin - Hampshire)
- Protection and business safety (Gavin Tomlinson – Derbyshire)
- Sector resource and improvement (Chris Strickland – Cambridge)
- Workforce (Ann Millington – Kent)

=== Funding ===
NFCC is funded through subscriptions, known as "professional partnership fees", payable by the fire and rescue services of the United Kingdom. These are calculated using a formula based on the size of community each fire and rescue service covers.

=== Chair ===
The NFCC is led by a full-time chair, Mark Hardingham. Hardingham is the second Chair of the NFCC, and was previously chief fire officer of Suffolk Fire and Rescue Service. The chair is paid a salary and allowance for vehicle costs, and other travel and subsistence payments. The Chair's performance is managed by a performance Committee, which holds them to account for the delivery of NFCC's annual plan. The committee comprises four members of the NFCC, and an independent member.

The chair is supported by a chief operating officer (COO). The COO oversees the day-to-day management of the organisation and oversees the governance arrangements for NFCC and the Board of Trustees. Various fire and rescue services provide services in support of the NFCC: support services by West Midlands Fire Service, a Central Programme Office by London Fire Brigade, and National Resilience management by Merseyside Fire and Rescue Service. Two unpaid Vice Chairs support and advise the Chair.

== Work ==
The NFCC describes itself as "the professional voice of the UK fire and rescue service", and is responsible for improvement and development of the fire and rescue services of the United Kingdom. The aims of the NFCC are to:

- Strengthen the professional/operational leadership of the Fire and Rescue Service
- Improve national co-ordination
- Reduce duplication; increase efficiency
- Support local service delivery
- Provide increased influence for Fire and Rescue Authorities and their services
