= King's Police Medal =

British award

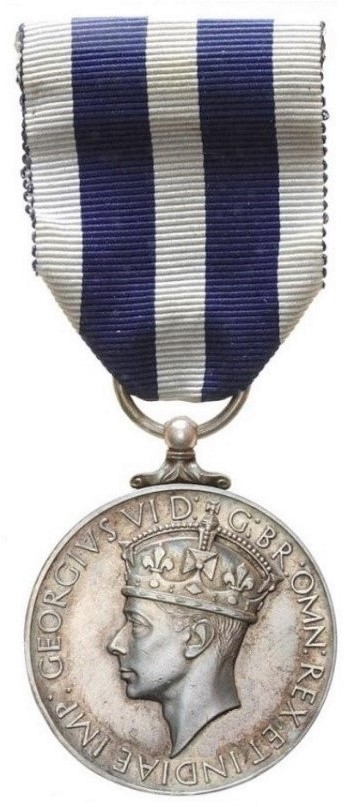
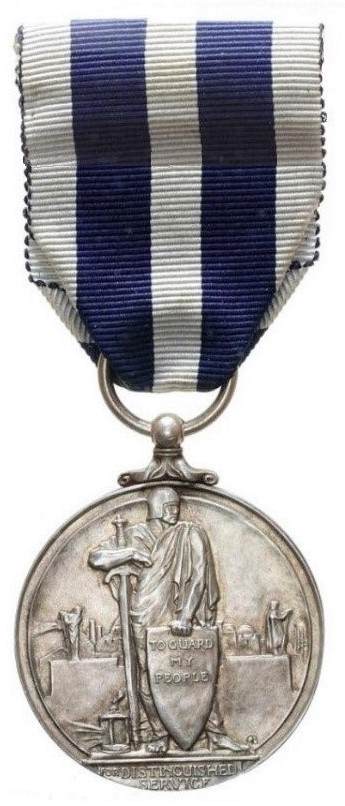
- King's Police Medal for Distinguished Service, King George VI version
- Type: Medal
- Awarded for: "acts of exceptional courage and skill at the cost of their lives, or exhibiting conspicuous devotion to duty"
- Presented by: United Kingdom and Commonwealth of Nations
- Eligibility: Members of the 42 territorial police forces of the United Kingdom
- Post-nominals: KPM
- Status: Currently awarded
- Established: 7 July 1909; 19 May 1954 (as Queen's Police Medal)
- KPM ribbons for Gallantry (left) and Distinguished Service (right)

Order of Wear
- Next (higher): George Medal (KPM for Gallantry); British Empire Medal (KPM for Service)
- Next (lower): King's Fire Service Medal, for Gallantry (KPM for Gallantry); King's Fire Service Medal, for Distinguished Service (KPM for Service)
- Related: Formerly awarded as King's Police Medal (1909–40), King's Police and Fire Services Medal (1940–54)

The King's Police Medal (KPM) is awarded to police in the United Kingdom for gallantry or distinguished service. It was also formerly awarded within the wider British Empire, including Commonwealth countries, most of which now have their own honours systems. The medal was established on 7 July 1909, initially inspired by the need to recognise the gallantry of the police officers involved in the Tottenham Outrage. Renamed the King's Police and Fire Services Medal (KPFSM) in 1940, it was replaced on 19 May 1954 by the Queen's Police Medal (QPM), when a separate Queen's Fire Service Medal was also instituted. The current award was renamed the King's Police Medal following the death of Queen Elizabeth II in 2022 and the accession of King Charles III to the throne of the United Kingdom.

Between 1909 and 1979, the medal was bestowed 4,070 times, for both gallantry and distinguished service, including dominion and empire awards. A total 54 bars and one second bar were awarded in this period.

Awards are announced in The Gazette.

== History ==
=== King's Police Medal ===
The original KPM, despite its name, was also awarded to members of recognised fire brigades. It was originally intended that the medal should be awarded once a year, to no more than 120 recipients, with a maximum of: 40 from the United Kingdom and Crown dependencies; 30 from the dominions; and 50 from the Indian Empire. More could be awarded in exceptional circumstances. Those who received a further award were to wear a silver bar on the ribbon in lieu of a further issue, or a rosette where the ribbon alone was worn. Initially recipients were required to have shown:

(a) Conspicuous gallantry in saving life and property, or in preventing crime or arresting criminals; the risks incurred to be estimated with due regard to the obligations and duties of the officer concerned.

(b) A specially distinguished record in administrative or detective service.

(c) Success in organizing Police Forces or Fire Brigades or Departments, or in maintaining their organization under special difficulties.

(d) Special services in dealing with serious or widespread outbreaks of crime or public disorder, or of fire.

(e) Valuable political and secret services.

(f) Special services to Royalty and Heads of States.

(g) Prolonged service; but only when distinguished by very exceptional ability and merit.

Provision was also made for the forfeiture of the award in the event of a recipient later being convicted of a criminal offence.

Minor amendments to the warrant were made on 3 October 1916. On 1 October 1930, changes were made to the forfeiture provisions, no longer specifying grounds for forfeiture, but also allowing the medal to be restored again. The 1931 New Year Honours list specified those medals awarded for gallantry. On 27 December 1933, the warrant was officially amended to introduce distinctions as to whether the medal was awarded for gallantry or for distinguished service, by adding an appropriate inscription to the reverse, and adding a central red stripe to the ribbon for gallantry awards. The award criteria were changed so recipients had:

either performed acts of exceptional courage and skill or exhibited conspicuous devotion to duty; and that such award shall be made only on a recommendation ... by the Secretary of State for the Home Department.

In 1936, amendments of 25 May gave greater provision for territories to opt to award their own equivalent medals. Further minor amendments were made on 15 December.

=== King's Police and Fire Services Medal ===
On 6 September 1940, the name was changed to the King's Police and Fire Services Medal to better reflect the eligibility of fire service personnel. There was no longer any limit on the number to be awarded in one year.

The last award of the medal for gallantry to a living recipient was in 1950, after which time it was awarded only posthumously.

=== Queen's Police Medal ===
In a warrant of 19 May 1954 a version of the medal named the Queen's Police Medal was introduced; at the same time a separate medal for the fire service was created, the Queen's Fire Service Medal. It was still to be awarded for both "conspicuous devotion to duty" and "acts of exceptional courage and skill", but for the first time added a proviso to the latter limiting it to such acts "at the cost of their lives" – there were only 34 such awards after 1954, the last being to Stephen Tibble in 1976, since which time the Queen's Gallantry Medal can also be awarded posthumously. Notable acts of gallantry in the police service normally now attract awards of the George Cross, George Medal, Queen's Gallantry Medal or the Queen's Commendation for Bravery. On 11 March 2022 the Queen approved amendments to the Royal Warrant to expressly state that members of the Special Constabulary in England and Wales were eligible for the medal, with members of the Special Constabulary in Scotland already eligible.

Over time, many Commonwealth countries have created their own police medals, replacing the issue of the QPM to police in those countries. For example, Australia created the Australian Police Medal in 1986. It did not supersede the QPM, which continued to be awarded to Australians until 1989. On 5 October 1992, Australian Prime Minister Paul Keating announced that Australia would make no further recommendations for British honours. The Australian Order of Wear states that "all imperial British awards made to Australian citizens after 5 October 1992 are foreign awards and should be worn accordingly".

==== King's South African Medal (South African version) ====
The South Africa version was introduced in 1937, awarded on the same basis as the British medal. It had a similar design, but with differences in its inscriptions, including a bi-lingual reverse. A total of 30 medals for gallantry and 17 for distinguished service were bestowed, with the last award in 1960.

== Post-nominal letters ==
Recipients may use the post-nominal letters QPM, KPM or KPFSM, as appropriate, although the right to use these was only granted officially on 20 July 1969.

== Description ==
It is a circular silver medal, 36 mm in diameter, with the ribbon suspended from a ring. While the basic design has remained the same since 1909, there have been a number of changes.

- The obverse has the profile of the reigning monarch with an appropriate inscription:
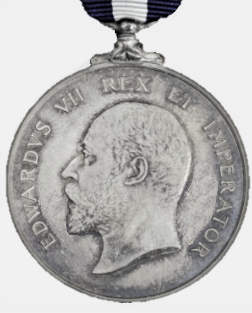
Edward VII, 1909–11

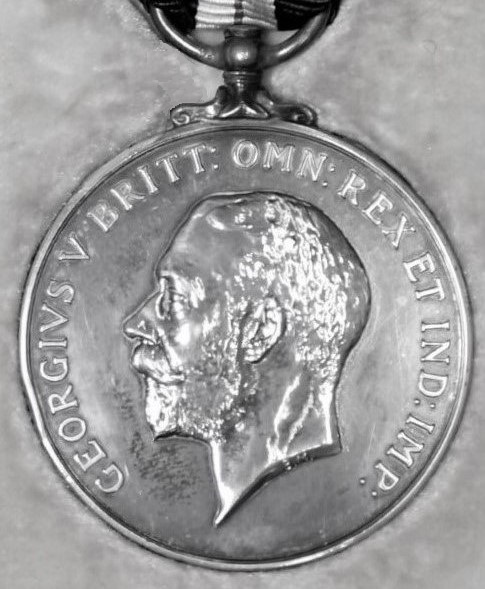
George V 1st type,
1911–31

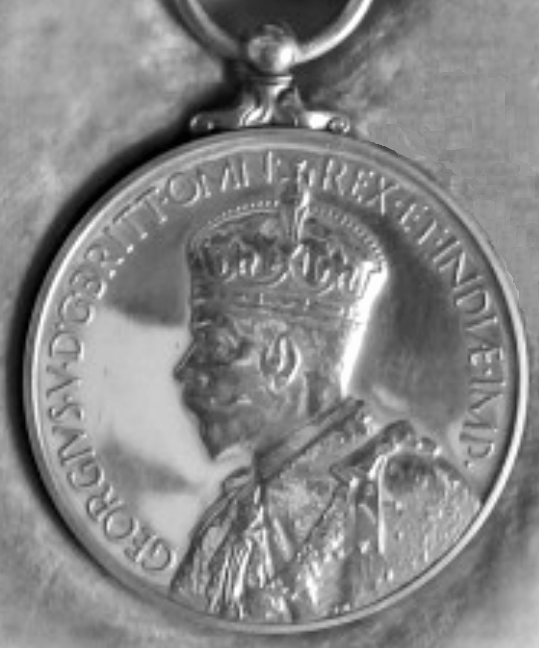
George V 2nd type
1931–37

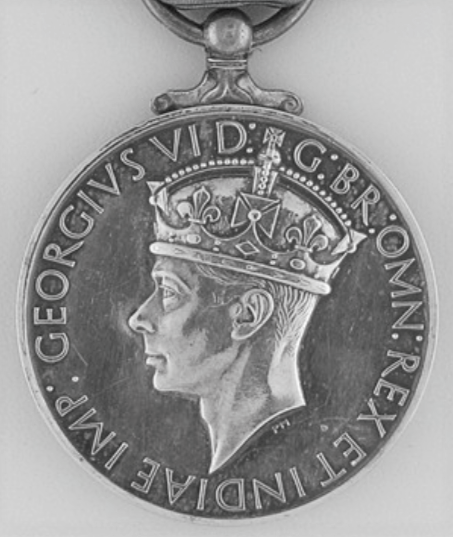
George VI, 1938–53. (Late issues omit 'INDIAE IMP')

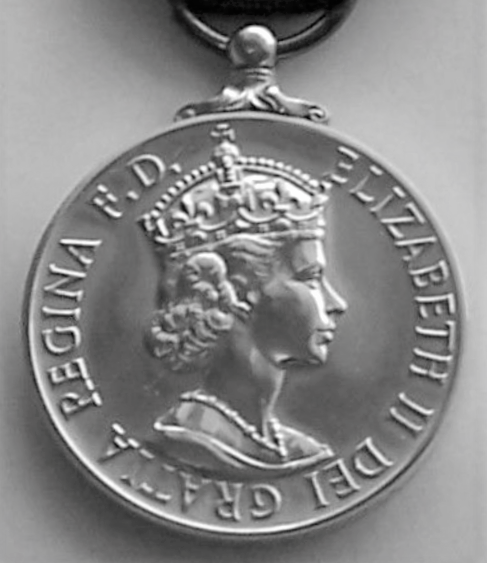
Elizabeth II, 1954–2022. (Early issues add 'BR: OMN')
- The reverse depicts Saint Michael, patron Saint of Police officers, holding a sword and shield at rest depicting that whilst armed and ready, he prefers peace. The exergue of the 1909 issue contains a laurel spray, but in 1933 this was replaced with the inscription For Distinguished Police Service or For Gallantry. Since 1954 the distinguished service version has the wording inscribed around the edge of the medal, with a laurel spray in the exergue, the gallantry version remaining unchanged.
- The name, rank and force of the recipient is inscribed on the rim of the medal.
- The 1.38 inches (35 mm) wide ribbon was originally dark blue with a silver stripe at each edge. In 1916 an additional central silver stripe was added with, from 1933, a thin red stripe down the middle of each silver stripe for awards for gallantry.

== See also ==
- King's Fire Service Medal
- British and Commonwealth orders and decorations
- Police Long Service and Good Conduct Medal
