= Fire services in the United Kingdom =

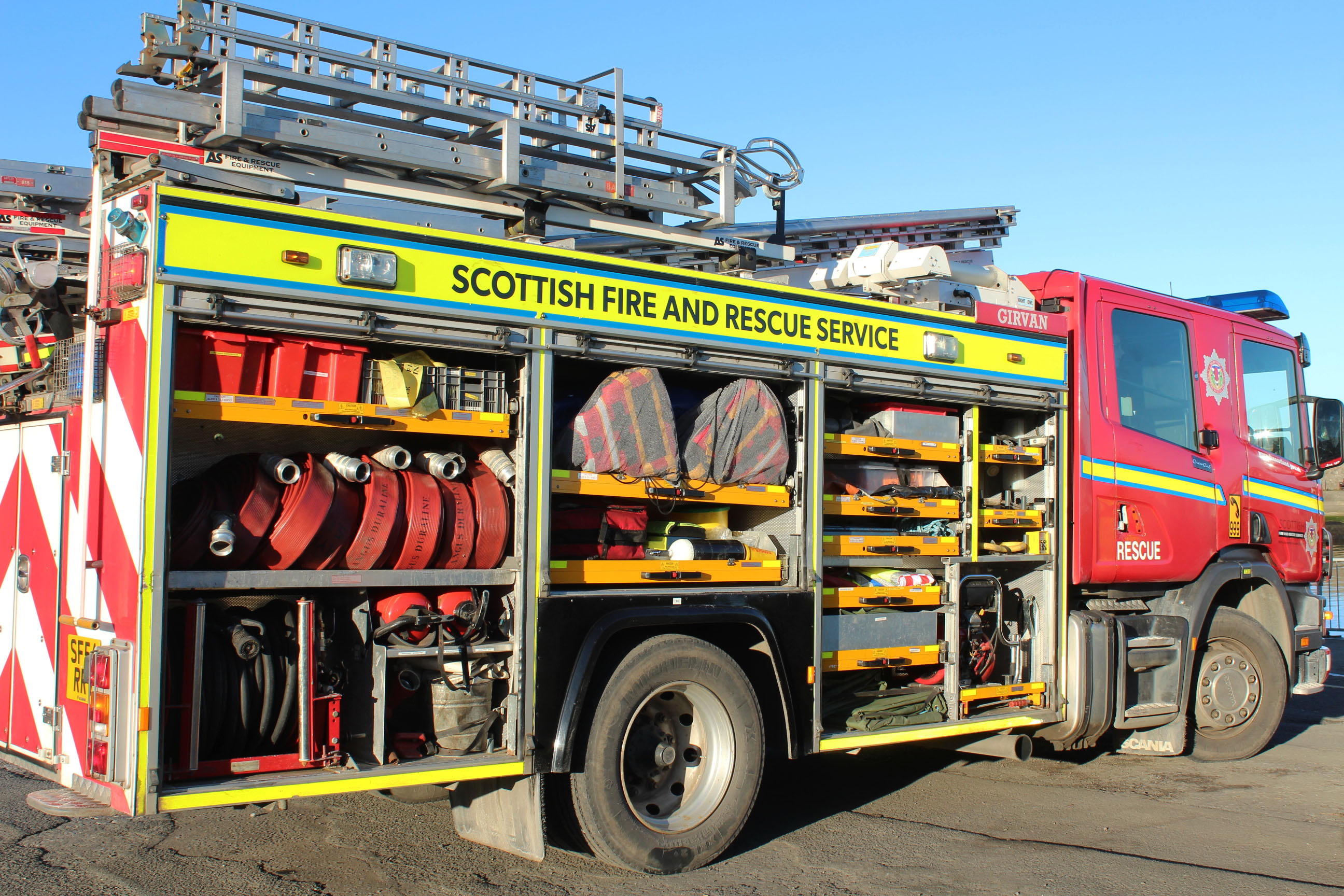
A fire engine of the Scottish Fire and Rescue Service, the largest fire service in the United Kingdom

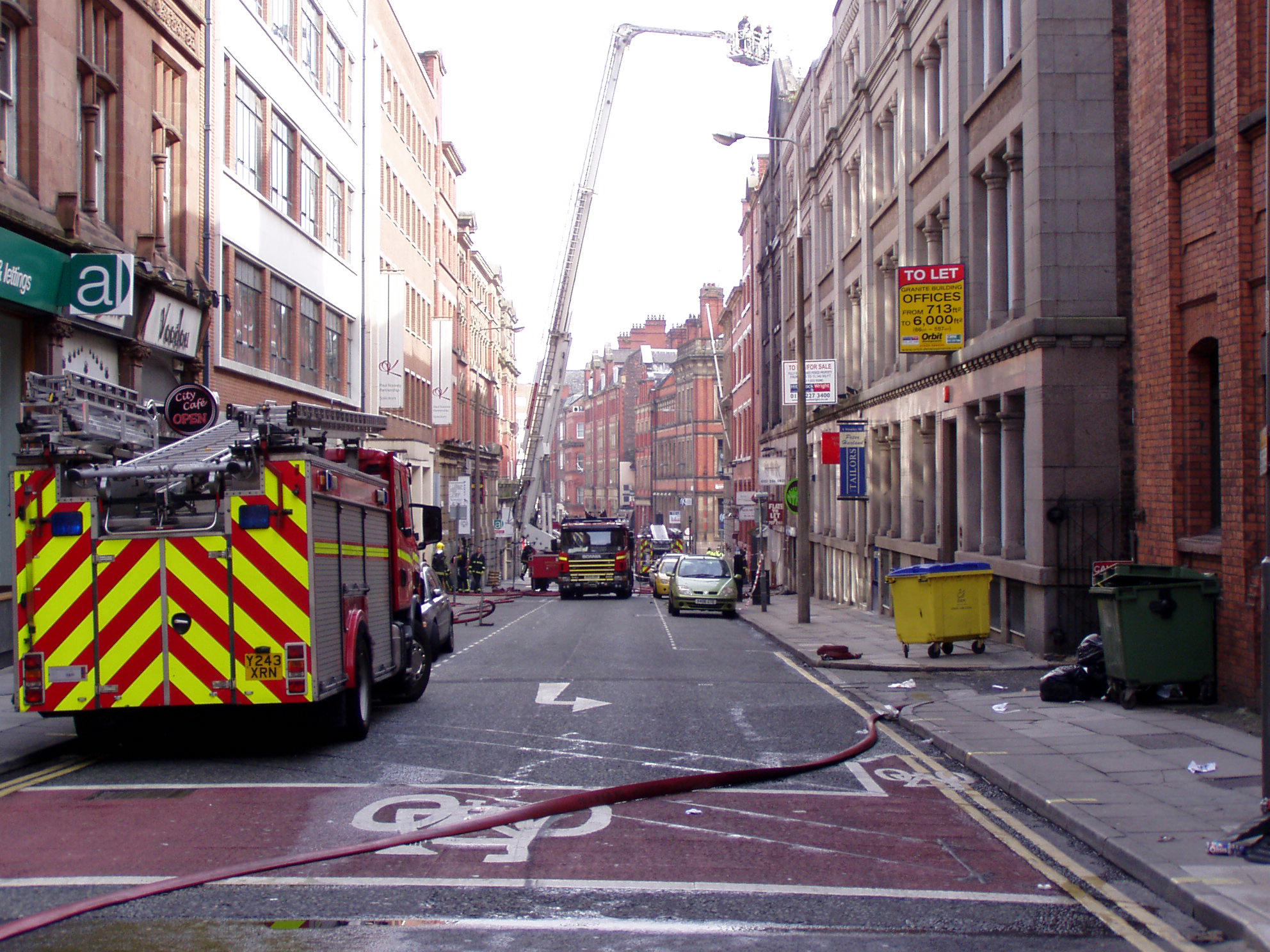
Merseyside Fire and Rescue Service in action

The fire services in the United Kingdom operate under separate legislative and administrative arrangements in England and Wales, Northern Ireland, and Scotland.

As of 2023, emergency cover is provided by 49 fire and rescue services (FRS) in the UK. The older terms of fire brigade and fire service survive in informal usage and in the names of a few organisations. England and Wales have local fire services which are each overseen by a fire authority, which is made up of representatives of local governments. Fire authorities have the power to raise a Council Tax levy for funding, with the remainder coming from the government. Scotland and Northern Ireland have centralised fire services, and so their authorities are effectively committees of the devolved parliaments. The total budget for fire services in 2014-15 was £2.9 billion.

Central government maintains national standards and a body of independent advisers through the Chief Fire and Rescue Adviser, which was created in 2007, while His Majesty's Inspectorate of Constabulary and Fire & Rescue Services provides direct oversight. The devolved government in Scotland has a similar agency, HMFSI Scotland.

Firefighters in the United Kingdom are allowed to join unions, the main one being the Fire Brigades Union, while chief fire officers (the heads of the various FRS) are members of the National Fire Chiefs Council (formerly the Chief Fire Officers Association), which has some role in national co-ordination.

The fire services have undergone significant changes since the beginning of the 21st century, a process that has been propelled by a devolution of central government powers, new legislation and a change to operational procedures in the light of terrorism attacks and threats.

== History ==
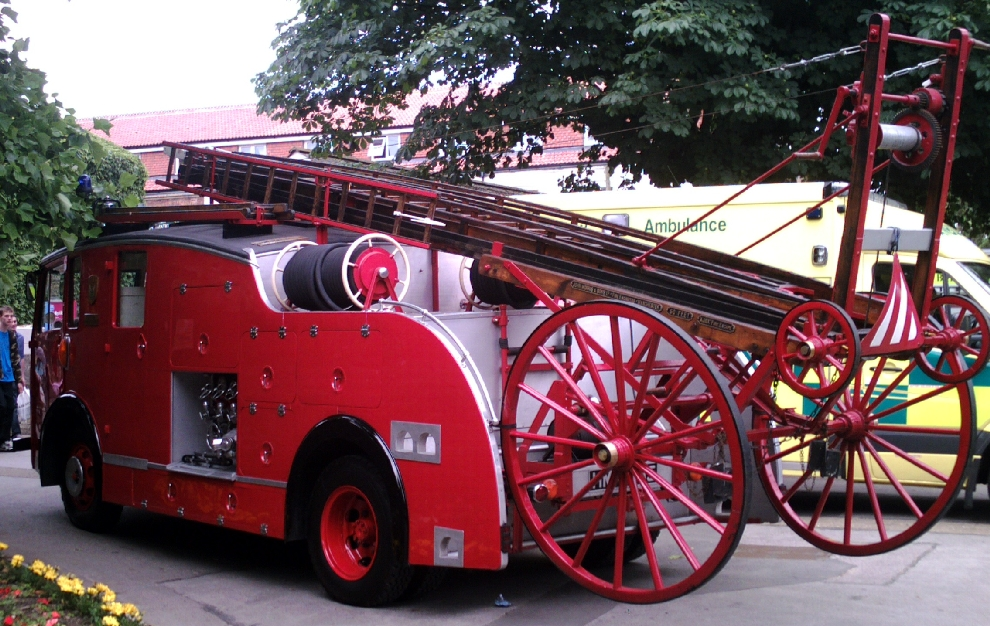
A 1951 Dennis P12 fire appliance belonging to the Wiltshire Fire Brigade

== Legislative framework ==
- See separate article History of fire safety legislation in the United Kingdom
- Comprehensive list of recent UK fire and rescue service legislation: Matching Legislation - Statute Law Database

=== Legislation (United Kingdom, Great Britain or England and Wales) ===
Fire services are established and granted their powers under fairly new legislation which has replaced a number of acts of Parliament dating back more than 60 years, but is still undergoing change; a rough timeline can be seen below.

- 1938: Fire Brigades Act 1938 (1 & 2 Geo. 6. c. 72). This act (which is no longer in force) provided for centralised co-ordination of fire brigades in Great Britain and made it mandatory for local authorities to arrange an effective fire service.
- 1947: Fire Services Act 1947 (10 & 11 Geo. 6. c. 41) This act transferred the functions of the National Fire Service to local authorities. Now repealed entirely in England and Wales by schedule 2 of the Fire and Rescue Services Act 2004.
- 1959: Fire Services Act 1959 (7 & 8 Eliz. 2. c. 44) This act amended the 1947 act; it dealt with pensions, staffing arrangements and provision of services by other authorities. It was repealed in England and Wales along with the 1947 act.
- 1999: Greater London Authority Act 1999 This act was necessary to allow for the formation of the Greater London Authority and in turn the London Fire and Emergency Planning Authority.

In 2002, there was a series of national fire strikes, with much of the discontent caused by the aforementioned report into the fire service conducted by Sir George Bain. In December 2002, the Independent Review of the Fire Service was published with the industrial action still ongoing; it made radical proposals to how the fire service should be organised and managed. Bain's report ultimately led to a change in the laws relating to firefighting.

- 2002: Independent Review of the Fire Service published
- 2004: Fire and Rescue Services Act 2004, generally only applying to England and Wales.
- 2006: The Regulatory Reform (Fire Safety) Order 2005 This piece of secondary legislation or statutory instrument replaces several other acts that dealt with fire precautions and fire safety in premises, including the now defunct process of issuing fire certificates. It came into force on 1 October 2006. The DfCLG has published a set of guides for non-domestic premises:Fire safety law and guidance documents for business
- 2006: The Government of Wales Act 2006 gave the National Assembly for Wales powers to pass laws on "Fire and rescue services. [and] Promotion of fire safety otherwise than by prohibition or regulation." but does not prevent future legislation being passed by the UK government which applies to two or more constituent countries.
- 2022: Fire Safety (England) Regulations 2022 were introduced, which implement most of the Grenfell Tower Inquiry recommendations. The law came in force from 23 January 2023, and form part of a package of fire safety measures that the UK government delivered following the Grenfell Tower fire to protect the public from potential fire hazards.

There are further plans to modernise the fire service according to the Local Government Association. Its website outlines future changes, and specific projects:

The aim of the Fire Modernisation Programme is to adopt modern work practices within the Fire & Rescue Service to become more efficient and effective, while strengthening the contingency and resilience of the Service to react to incidents.

==== Select committee ====
The fire service in England and Wales is scrutinised by a select committee of the House of Commons. In June 2006, the fire and rescue service select committee, under the auspices of the Communities and Local Government Committee, published its latest report.

The committee's brief is:

The Communities and Local Government Committee is appointed by the House of Commons to examine the expenditure, administration, and policy of the Department for Communities and Local Government and its associated bodies.

The committee's report, and the subsequent government response in September 2006, are important as they outlined progress on the FiReControl, efforts to address diversity and the planned closure of HMFSI in 2007 among many issues.

Both documents are interesting as they refer back to Professor Bain's report and the many recommendations it made and continue to put forward the notion that there is an ongoing need to modernise FRSs. For example, where FRSs were historically inspected by HMFSI, much of this work is now carried out by the National Audit Office.

On 8 February 2010, the House of Commons Communities and Local Government Select Committee heard evidence on the Fire Control project. Called to give evidence were Councillors Brian Coleman and James Pearson from the Local Government Association. Also giving evidence Matt Wrack from the Fire Brigades Union and John Bonney Chief Fire Officers Association. The second session heard evidence from Shahid Malik MP Fire Minister, Sir Ken Knight Chief Fire and Rescue Adviser, Shona Dunn Director for Fire and Resilience Department for Communities and Local Government, Robin Southwell CEO and Roger Diggle Project Director EADS. The committee was chaired by Phyllis Starkey MP and attracted significant media attention.

=== Legislation and administration (England) ===
Because of the Government of Wales Act 2006, future legislation might be passed that can only affect England.

=== Legislation and administration (Northern Ireland) ===
Fire and rescue services in Northern Ireland are provided by a single entity, the Northern Ireland Fire and Rescue Service, a statutory corporation funded by the Department of Health, Social Services and Public Safety.

- 1950: When the National Fire Service Northern Ireland was disbanded, three fire authorities took control of firefighting but were unified as the Northern Ireland Fire Authority in 1950. The Fire Services (Amendment) Act (Northern Ireland) 1950 (c. 4 (N.I.)) became primary legislation in the same year.
- 2006: Fire and Rescue Services (Northern Ireland) Order 2006 (SI 2006/1254 (N.I. 9))

=== Legislation and administration (Scotland) ===
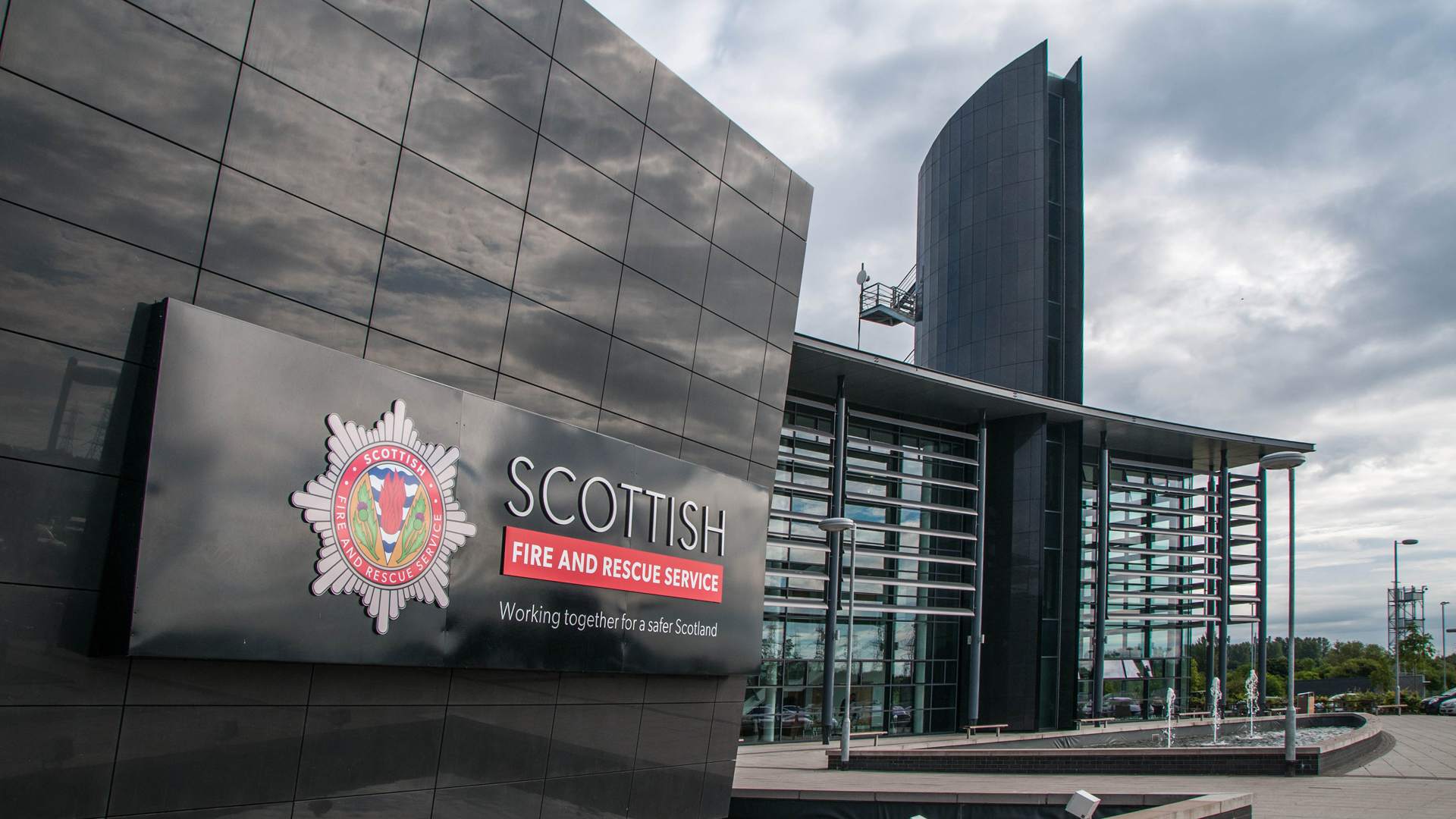
The HQ of the Scottish Fire and Rescue Service in Cambuslang

Fire services in Scotland are the responsibility of the Cabinet Secretary for Justice in the Scottish Government. Previously the responsibility lay with the Secretary of State for Scotland (the relevant "Secretary of State" referred to in legislation applicable to Scotland).

- 1824: Establishment of municipal fire service in Edinburgh, the first public fire brigade in the UK
- 1885: Creation of Scottish Office transferring administrative (but not legislative) responsibility to Secretary of State for Scotland.
- 1938: Fire Services Act 1938 combined the functions of 185 fire brigades and imposed fire-fighting duties upon local authorities,
- 1941: Fire brigades transferred to National Fire Service (NFS) to form No.11 Region].
- 1947: Fire Services Act 1947 returned fire brigades in Scotland to local authority control, mostly via joint boards. 11 brigades were created resembling somewhat the NFS areas. Section 36 of the Act dealt with its application to Scotland. Parts of the Act remain in force in Scotland.
- 1959: Parts of the UK Fire Services Act 1959 remain in force in Scotland.
- 1996: Creation of additional joint boards consequent to local government re-organisation.
- 1999: Responsibility transfers from Secretary of State for Scotland to the Scottish Executive
- 2002: Consultation Paper: "The Scottish Fire Service of the Future"
- 2003: Consultation Paper: "The Scottish Fire and Rescue Service: legislative proposals".
- 2004: introduction of Fire (Scotland) Bill consequent to 2003 consultation paper.
- 2005: Fire (Scotland) Act 2005 The scope of this act includes a "fire safety regime for non-domestic premises", but it also includes legislation that allows for the provision and operation of fire and rescue services for the eight local authority and joint board FRS in Scotland.
- 2012: Police and Fire Reform (Scotland) Act 2012, creating a single Scottish Fire and Rescue Service with effect from 1 April 2013

=== Legislation and administration (Wales) ===
- 2006 : The Government of Wales Act 2006 gave the National Assembly for Wales powers to pass laws on "Fire and rescue services. [and] Promotion of fire safety otherwise than by prohibition or regulation.".

== Government responsibility for fire services ==
=== Central government ===
Historically, there had been about 1,600 local authority fire services under the responsibility of the Home Office in England and Wales until World War II. In 1941, the creation of the National Fire Service brought all UK fire brigades under central government control. The National Fire Service was in turn under the auspices of the Civil Defence Service. Post-war legislation returned control to the Northern Ireland Government, the Home Office (for services in England and Wales) and the Secretary of State for Scotland.

=== England ===
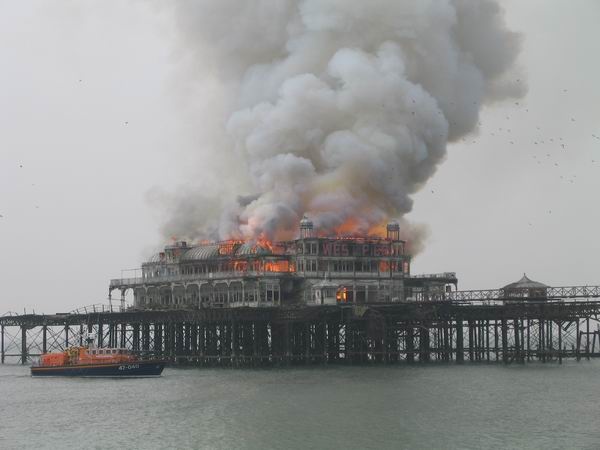
Fire on West Pier in Brighton, England

The fire service has always been the ultimate responsibility of a government department, historically assisted by an executive agency called His Majesty's Fire Service Inspectorate or HMFSI, its function was described thus:

To achieve our vision by education and legislation, in an environment that encourages best practice, equality and diversity, health and safety and best value, and through inspection, to advance the development and continuous improvement of fire brigades.

Directly after the May 2001 general election, control of the fire service in England and Wales passed from the Home Office to the Department for Transport, Local Government and Regions (DTLR). This department was then broken up, creating the Office of the Deputy Prime Minister (ODPM) which took central government responsibility.

In May 2006, the ODPM was re-structured, creating the Department for Communities and Local Government (CLG), and it became the central government department for fire authorities in England, but would be advised by a new department under the direction of the Chief Fire and Rescue Adviser. The department became the Ministry of Housing, Communities and Local Government (MHCLG) in 2018, and then Department for Levelling Up, Housing and Communities in September 2021.

==== Fire service ministers ====
The fire service minister is the most senior politician whose brief directly includes fire and rescue issues in England and Wales, other parts of the UK never having had the matter specifically under the control of a UK minister in peacetime. The fire service minister is not part of the prime minister's cabinet. The post is held by a junior minister or Parliamentary Under-Secretary of State who reports to the Secretary of State for Levelling Up, Housing and Communities, who takes ultimate responsibility for fire and rescue, but that is part of a much wider brief.

==== Regional government ====
Below national level, there are regional and local bodies whose role it is to establish a fire authority, implement the legislation from the tier above, while working alongside the relevant HMFSI and other interested bodies.

- Greater London Authority
- London Fire and Emergency Planning Authority (under direct control of Greater London Authority)
- Metropolitan and county fire and rescue services or brigades - see below

The next level beneath that of local authority, is a brigade which usually comes under the operational command of a high ranking senior officer. Traditionally chief fire officers have risen through the ranks from firefighter, although under modernisation plans brigades can now operate graduate entry, and fast track promotion as is already the case with the armed forces and the police. The London Fire Brigade announced details of its graduate scheme in 2007. Chief Fire Officers (CFO) 'speak' collectively via the Chief Fire Officers Association.

- Fire authority: local councillors elected to set policy on its fire and rescue services, and distribute funding, and approve major spending
- Local authority: Chief executive - overall powers for all an authority's functions, including fire, rescue and resilience
- Brigade: Chief Fire Officer (CFO), Brigade Manager, or (in Greater London) Commissioner - overall operational, strategic and command of a brigade or fire and rescue service

CFOs do attend some operational incidents. Hertfordshire's CFO, Roy Wilsher, took command at the Buncefield oil depot fire in 2005, forming part of the gold command team. If a CFO attends an incident, they will usually be the commanding officer of that incident.

=== Scotland ===
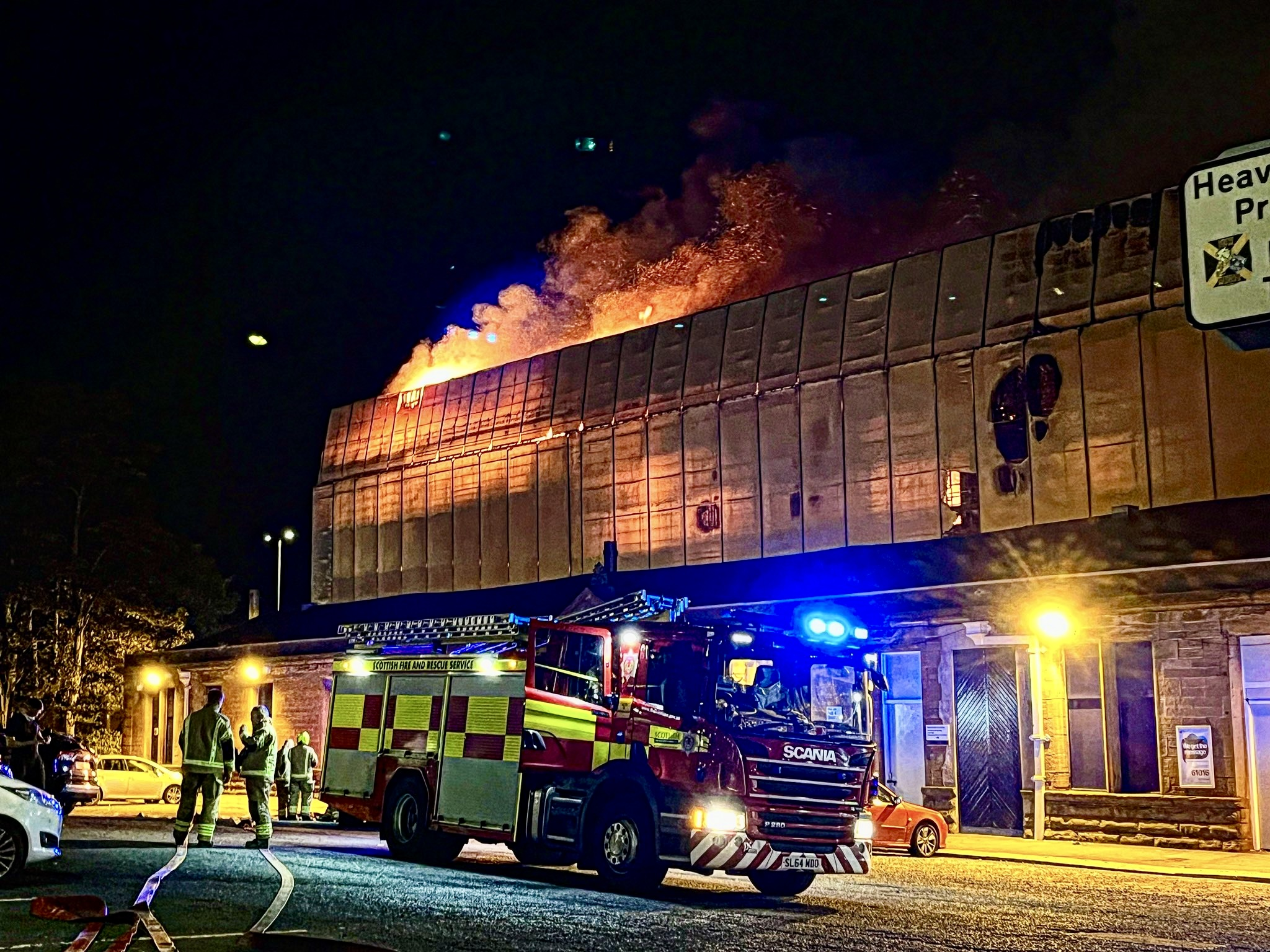
Ayr Station Hotel fire in Ayr, Scotland, September 2023

Except for the period when the National Fire Service existed, matters concerning fire fighting fell within the remit of the Scottish Office (later the Scottish Executive, now the Scottish Government). In Scotland, His Majesty's Fire Service Inspectorate for Scotland (commonly known HMFSI) exists to inspect the fire service to ascertain how they are discharging their functions under relevant legislation. It functions as an autonomous body under the charge of the Justice Ministry of the Scottish Government.

Since 1 April 2013, there has been a single Scottish Fire and Rescue Service in place of the eight former regional services.

=== Northern Ireland ===
Matters concerning fire fighting fell within the remit of the government of Northern Ireland, with two exceptions; the period of the existence of the National Fire Service (Northern Ireland), and the period of direct rule from Westminster when the government of Northern Ireland did not exist.

=== Wales ===
Responsibility for fire and rescue services and promotion of fire safety in Wales lies with the Welsh Government.

=== Inspections ===
In England, Wales, and Northern Ireland, fire services are inspected by what was known as the Fire Service Inspectorate. In February 2007, the government announced it was establishing a new unit to provide ministers and civil servants with "independent professional advice on fire and rescue issues". It is headed by a new role known as the Chief Fire and Rescue Adviser. The roles carries the historical function of His Majesty's Fire Service Inspectorate. The Chief Fire and Rescue Adviser is also titled His Majesty's Chief Inspector of Fire Services. Its role (among others) is to work towards reducing the number of fire deaths in England and Wales, and implement changes to FRS required by the Fire and Rescue Services Act 2004.

In Scotland, the Scottish Fire and Rescue Service is inspected by His Majesty's Fire Service Inspectorate for Scotland.

== Fire service structure ==
=== FRS or brigade-level ===
Brigades are further sub-divided according to local practice as follows:

- Command: Large brigades, such as the London Fire Brigade, are divided into commands
- Area: A brigade or FRS can also be divided into areas, for example London used to consist of five geographical areas: northwest, north, northeast, southwest and southeast
- Divisional: A smaller geographical area, again it can be decided locally; again London until 1986 consisted of eleven divisions
- Borough: Brigades are now aligned with local councils, and because of London's size, its three commands also overlap with the London boroughs, so each borough is a small division. It now has borough teams, and a separate list of stations shows which borough it belongs to.

=== Firefighters ===
The following types of work pattern are found at fire stations:

- Wholetime: Firefighters work full-time in on two day and two night shifts within the fire service.
- Day crewed: Firefighters work a 10- to 12-hour day shift and are retained at night.
- Day crew plus: Firefighters work a 24-hour shift consisting of 12 hours in station and spending the night at an accommodation building on the fire station plot.
- Retained: Retained firefighters are on call for long periods to respond to incidents. They are paid a salary for the time they spend on call and a greater amount for each incident they respond to, on average two or three per week. Many have jobs outside of the fire service.
- Volunteer: Volunteer firefighters are now rare, though some stations are run by volunteers in certain rural areas, such as Scotland and North Yorkshire. There are two small fire services that are run entirely by volunteers – the Peterborough Volunteer Fire Brigade and the Borth Voluntary Fire Unit (near Aberystwyth, Wales). These are contracted to provide services for a regular fire service.

Large town fire stations have full-time crews, though many employ retained firefighters as well. Small rural ones are usually staffed only by retained firefighters.

=== Ranks and roles ===
Ranks and roles vary between services, but include:

- Station commander or Station manager (formerly Assistant Divisional Officer)
- Watch commander or Watch manager (formerly Station Officer, still used in the London Fire Brigade)
- Sub-Officer
- Crew commander or crew manager (roughly equivalent to the former Leading Firefighter)
- Firefighter

Former ranks include:

- Divisional officer

Other fire service title	Chief fire officer	Deputy chief fire officer	Assistant chief fire officer		Area manager	Group manager	Station manager	Watch manager	Crew manager		Firefighter
London title	Commissioner	Deputy commissioner	Assistant commissioner		Deputy assistant commissioner	Group commander (borough commander)	Station commander	Station officer (WMB)	Sub-officer (WMA)	Leading firefighter (CM)	Firefighter
Scottish title	Chief fire officer	Deputy chief fire officer	Assistant chief fire officer	Deputy assistant chief fire officer	Area manager	Group manager	Station manager	Watch manager	Crew manager		Firefighter
Isle of Man title	Chief fire officer	Deputy chief fire officer				Divisional officer	Assistant divisional officer	Station officer	Sub officer	Leading firefighter	Firefighter
Gibraltar title	Chief fire officer	Deputy chief fire officer				Divisional officer		Station officer	Sub officer	Leading firefighter	Firefighter
Old structure	Chief fire officer	Deputy chief officer	Assistant chief officer		Senior divisional officer	Divisional officer	Assistant divisional officer	Station officer	Sub officer	Leading firefighter	Firefighter
Insignia											

=== Resilience ===
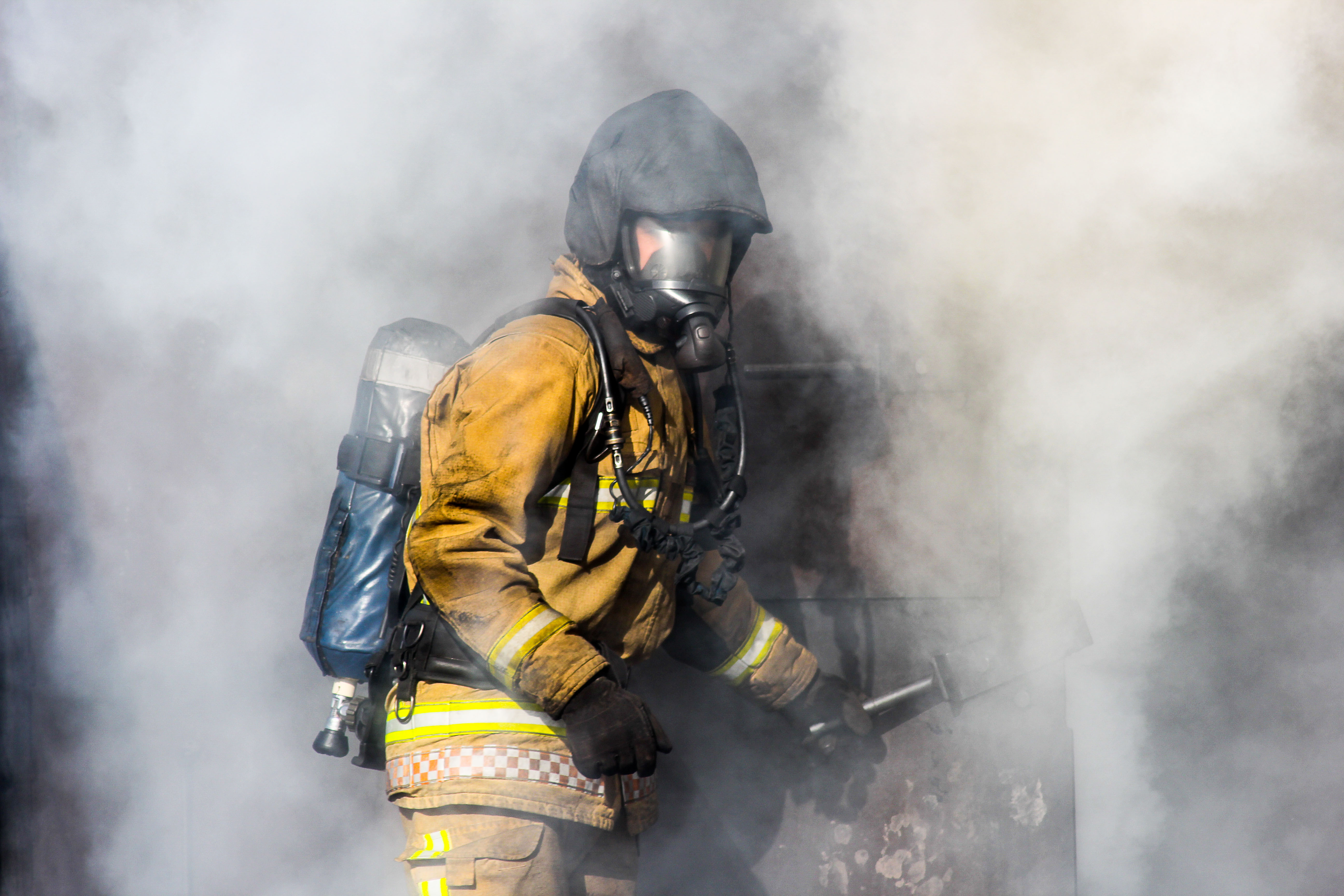
A Staffordshire Fire and Rescue Service firefighter, training in a smoke house

The Cabinet Office is responsible for the Civil Contingencies Secretariat (CSS), which provides advice for individuals in case of a major disaster:

"The (web)site provides easily understandable guidance for the general public on how to prepare themselves, their families and their homes and businesses to cope during an emergency or disaster."

Any such emergency or disaster is likely to involve a UK FRS, and the generic term for such contingency plans has become known as resilience The 'Preparing for emergencies website' gives specific government advice on fire safety, specific examples include the summer fire safety campaign, and schools' fire safety guide which are just two examples.

== Fire service funding ==
In the UK, an FRS generally provides its services for free, although there are some special services that can be charged for, and some additional services that can be paid for. The service is free to the end user in the case of an emergency. Funding for the fire service comes from two principal sources: a central government grant, and a small levy on the local council tax. This levy is called a precept.

There was a 17% reduction in fire service funding between 2010 and 2016, according to the National Audit Office.

== Modernisation ==
=== The need for modernisation ===
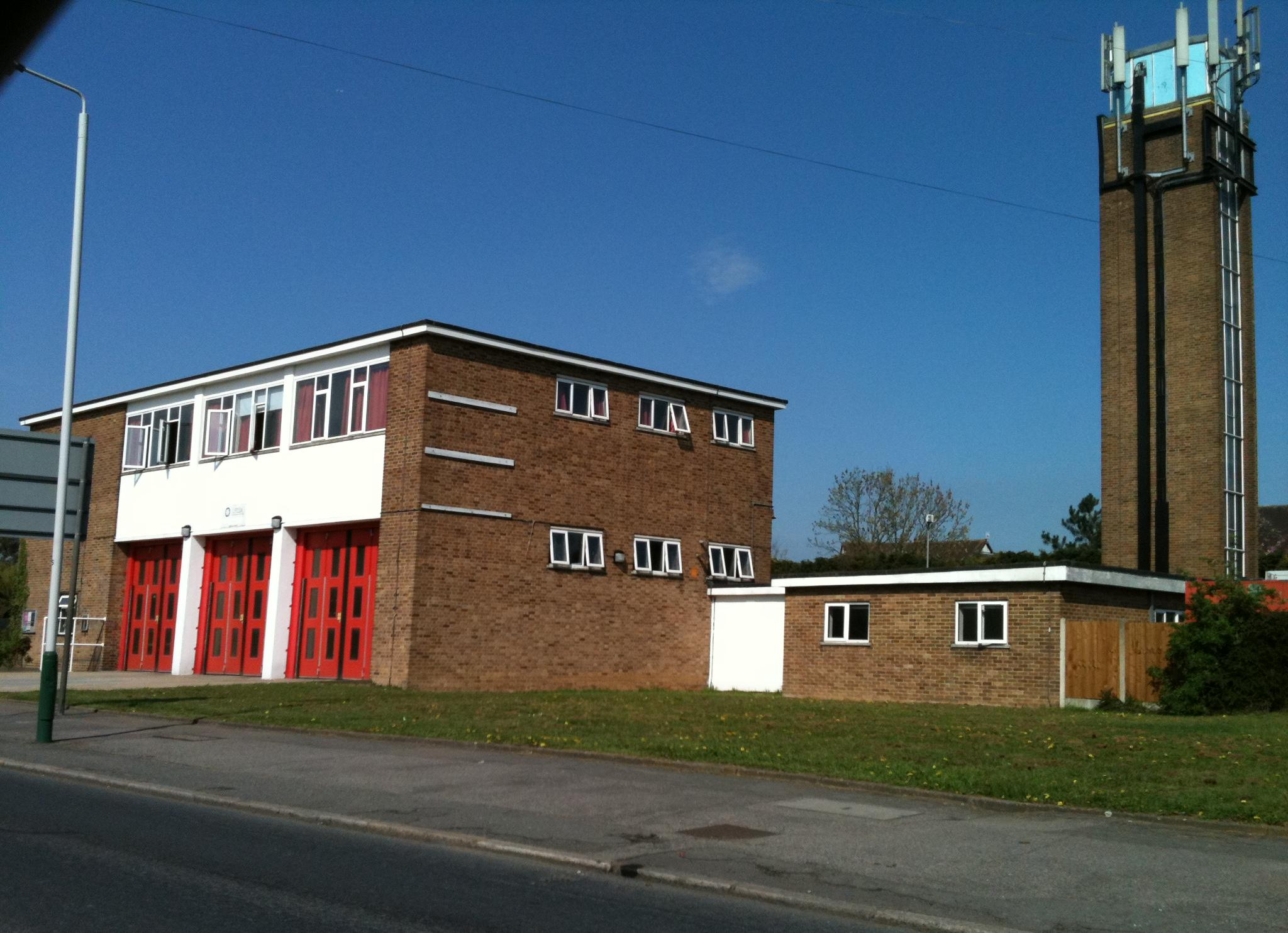
A London Fire Brigade station at Romford

In 2002, Professor Sir George Bain was asked by the government to conduct a wide-ranging review of the fire service in the UK. His report, the Independent Review of the Fire Service, led to rapid changes to fire and rescue services, and was the basis of what eventually became the Fire and Rescue Services Act 2004. Bain's terms of reference were described in September 2002 as follows:

"Having regard to the changing and developing role of the Fire Service in the United Kingdom, to inquire into and make recommendations on the future organisation and management of the Fire Service..."

Bain's report was unpopular with firefighters, and a long period of industrial action started in 2002 and continued until 2003 when a new pay and conditions package was put together.

One of the areas identified by Bain as being in need of modernisation was FRS approach to fire prevention and community fire safety. There is now more emphasis on fire prevention and providing public information coupled with encouraging businesses and individuals to take responsibility for providing a risk assessment of businesses—which became law in October 2006. Additionally, changes to central government, local government, and geographical boundaries have affected the fire service in the UK.

The fire service in England consists of local authority brigades or FRSs, which come under the administrative control of metropolitan and shire, or county fire authorities (e.g. Essex County Fire and Rescue Service).

Most statutory firefighting bodies consist of a fire authority and brigade, the former responsible for political and administrative aspects of service provision and the latter for delivering it. For example, Oxfordshire County Council is responsible for Oxfordshire Fire and Rescue Service. The armed forces, private fire brigades and airports all make their own firefighting provision.

Another area identified in Bain's report was the FRS' capacity to respond to major incidents. Bain's review stated that the fire service should have specific responsibilities for: "Emergency preparedness coupled with the capacity and resilience to respond to major incidents of terrorism and other chemical, biological, radiological or nuclear threats". In England and Wales, three projects are being rolled out that will help the FRS deal with incidents like these. The projects come under the umbrella of the Fire Resilience programme. The programme will provide the FRS with a far greater resilience and control to handle all types of incident.

In 2010, firefighters from across the UK and European Union held an urban search and rescue exercise near Portsmouth. Exercise Orion simulated rescuing survivors from buildings and bridges which had collapsed during an earthquake.

==== New Dimension ====
New Dimension was the first Fire Resilience project to be implemented. It provided FRSs with a wide range of equipment and vehicles to help deal with major challenges like floods and terrorist attacks.

==== FireLink ====
FireLink is the new digital FRS wide area communications system in England, Scotland and Wales. The FRS use wide area radios to communicate between vehicles and control rooms but there has never been a fully compatible system. FireLink is more efficient and provides greater resilience for command and control. The fire service's ability to communicate efficiently, across different brigades and with other emergency services has never been easy. The issue was raised by Sir Desmond Fennell, who conducted the public inquiry into the King's Cross fire in 1987. Fennell recommended when his report was published in 1988 that fireground communications be addressed as an issue of "high importance".

==== FiReControl ====
Prof Bain's report highlighted many areas of proposed change that include working practices, shift hours and time spent on fire prevention duties. One of the proposals which is now well under way is the reduction of fire service control rooms.

At present, each of England's 45 (the number FRS was reduced from 46 in April 2007 with the merger of Devon and Somerset FRSs) FRSs handles its own calls from either the 999 system or mobile phone companies. Additionally, calls are accepted from the other emergency services by dedicated landlines. The FiReControl project planned to build nine new purpose-built Regional Control Centres (RCCs). The aim was to rationalise call handling and aim for greater communication between the emergency services.

At present, 999 calls - whether by mobile telephone or landline - are answered by a BT operator, who feeds the call to a fire, police, ambulance, or coastguard Emergency Control Centre as required. Staff, known as control operators or control officers, also despatch the fire appliances, maintain radio communications and provide detailed risk and geographical information. These operators are employed by a FRS, wear a similar uniform to firefighters, and have their own rank structure. The role of specialist fire officers and control operators overlaps where they work jointly in control or command centres, but the subject of mobilising, command and control would change as the FiReControl project advances.

Following much local resistance, and change of government, the FiReControl project was abandoned in 2010. No new control rooms were opened.

=== Fire safety ===
- See separate article History of fire safety legislation in the United Kingdom

Historically fire safety was a function of local authorities rather than the fire service however in 1947 the introduction of the Fire Services Act gave the Fire Brigades their first responsibilities for fire safety. The Fire Precautions Act 1971, the Fire Precautions (Workplace) Regulations 1997 and the Regulatory Reform (Fire Safety) Order 2005 gave more powers to the service.

Today, the modernisation of the UK fire service has taken into account the role that it plays in fire safety issues and that issue is high on the agenda of most fire and rescue services. Many brigades started to produce Integrated Management Plans (IMP) to take into account these new responsibilities and produced plans for not only fire safety in the workplace but also in the community. Now all fire and rescue services have community based fire safety departments.

The Fire and Rescue Services Act 2004 now lays out in Section 6 what the fire service must do. It states that a fire and rescue authority must make provision for the purpose of promoting fire safety in its area and this must include the provision of information, publicity and encouragement in respect of the steps to be taken to prevent fires and death or injury by fire not only by the enforcement of specific fire safety legislation, but also by a proactive strategy targeted at all sections of the community.

== Fire safety statistics in the UK ==
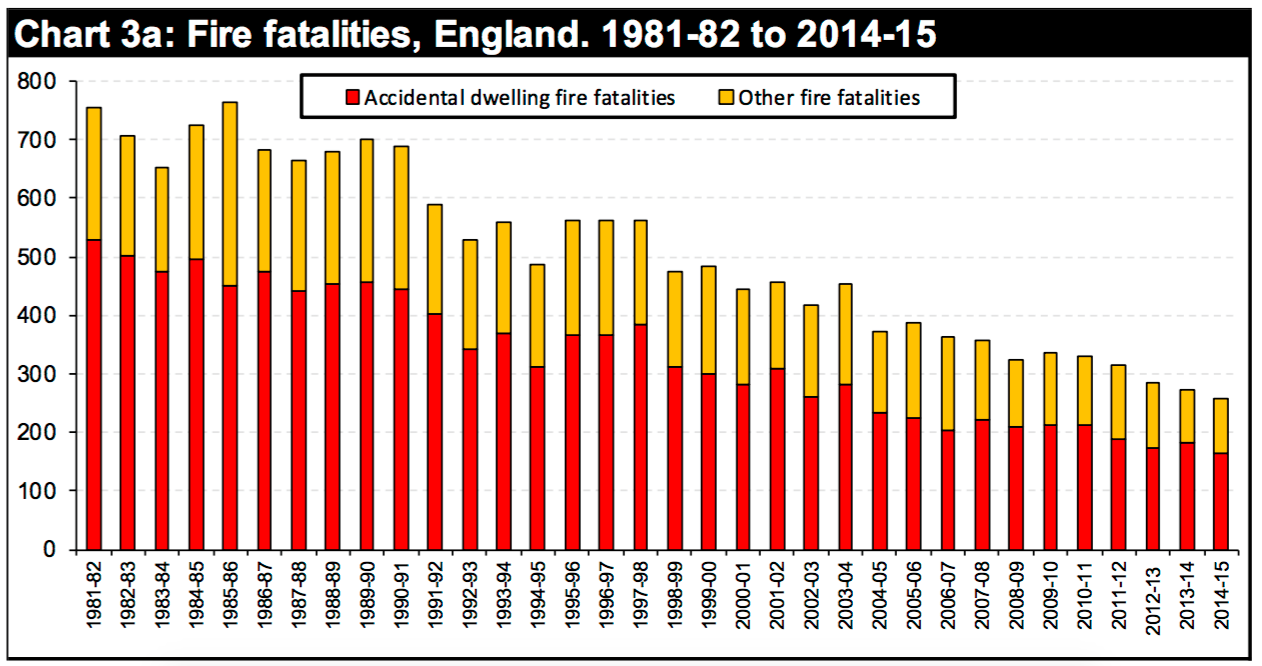
Fire casualties in the UK from 1981–82 to 2014-15

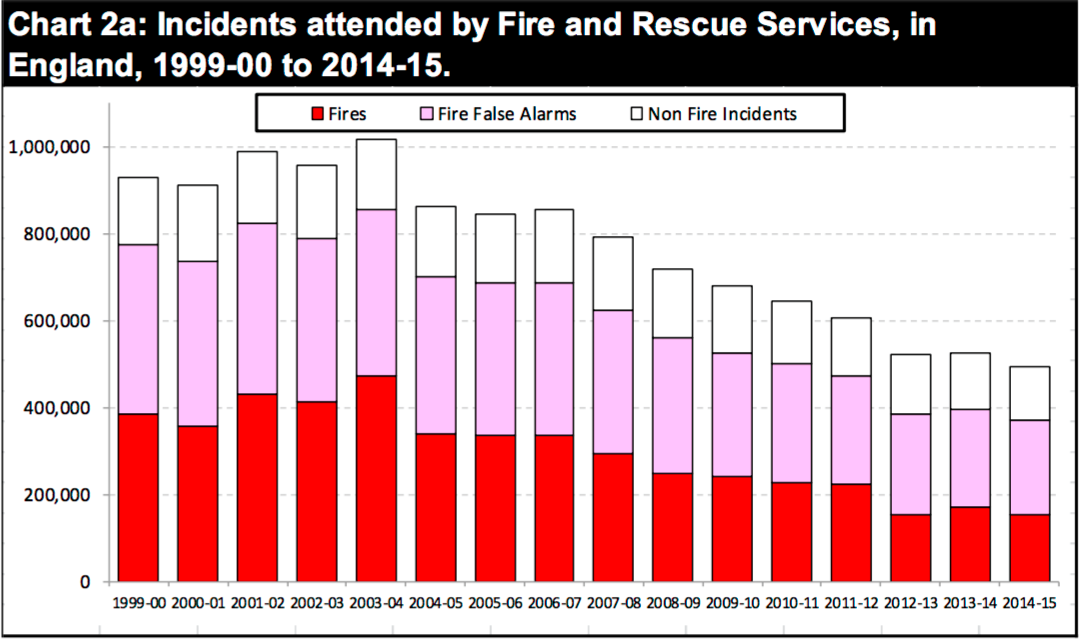
Fires in the UK 1999–00 to 2014-15

Fires and fire fatalities dropped in the UK in the ten years to 2015 as seen in the graphs to the right.

== Incident reporting ==
Information about each fire incident is collected by each FRS to DCLG standards. The reporting standards include the following parameters:

- Primary or secondary fire - primary fires involve damage to property with an identifiable owner and are coded FDR1. Secondary fires do not and are coded FDR3.
- Accidental or deliberate fire
- Occupancy of dwellings for accidental residential fires: Single Occupancy; Multiple Occupancy (Same); Multiple Occupancy (Different; No Occupancy
- Deliberate secondary fires involving rubbish: domestic wheelie bins; commercial/business refuse bins; fixed/street litter bins; refuse /litter in the open.
- The involvement of children, youths or adults
- The registration plate details where available in relation to vehicle fires
- Identified building names and street locations

== Public fire and rescue services ==
=== England ===
- Avon Fire and Rescue Service
- Bedfordshire Fire and Rescue Service
- Royal Berkshire Fire and Rescue Service
- Buckinghamshire Fire and Rescue Service
- Cambridgeshire Fire and Rescue Service
- Cheshire Fire and Rescue Service
- Cleveland Fire Brigade
- Cornwall Fire and Rescue Service
- County Durham and Darlington Fire and Rescue Service
- Cumbria Fire and Rescue Service
- Derbyshire Fire and Rescue Service
- Devon and Somerset Fire and Rescue Service (new FRS created by merger in 2007)
- Dorset and Wiltshire Fire and Rescue Service (new FRS created by merger in 2016)
- East Sussex Fire and Rescue Service
- Essex County Fire and Rescue Service
- Gloucestershire Fire and Rescue Service
- Greater Manchester Fire and Rescue Service
- Hampshire & Isle of Wight Fire and Rescue Service (new FRS created by merger in 2021)
- Hereford and Worcester Fire and Rescue Service
- Hertfordshire Fire and Rescue Service
- Humberside Fire and Rescue Service
- Isles of Scilly Fire and Rescue Service
- Kent Fire and Rescue Service
- Lancashire Fire and Rescue Service
- Leicestershire Fire and Rescue Service
- Lincolnshire Fire and Rescue Service
- London Fire Brigade
- Merseyside Fire and Rescue Service
- Norfolk Fire and Rescue Service
- Northamptonshire Fire and Rescue Service
- Northumberland Fire and Rescue Service
- North Yorkshire Fire and Rescue Service
- Nottinghamshire Fire and Rescue Service
- Oxfordshire Fire and Rescue Service
- Shropshire Fire and Rescue Service
- South Yorkshire Fire and Rescue Service
- Staffordshire Fire and Rescue Service
- Suffolk Fire and Rescue Service
- Surrey Fire and Rescue Service
- Tyne and Wear Fire and Rescue Service
- Warwickshire Fire and Rescue Service
- West Midlands Fire Service
- West Sussex Fire and Rescue Service
- West Yorkshire Fire and Rescue Service

=== Northern Ireland ===
Northern Ireland has had a single statutory fire service since 1950.

- Northern Ireland Fire and Rescue Service

See also: History of fire brigades in Northern Ireland

=== Scotland ===
Scotland has also had a single statutory fire service since 1 April 2013, with its headquarters in Cambuslang.

- Scottish Fire and Rescue Service

See also: History of fire brigades in Scotland

=== Wales ===
Wales saw a reduction in the number of fire brigades on local government reorganisation in 1996, from eight (the number of former administrative counties) to three, made up of groups of the new principal areas.

- Mid and West Wales Fire and Rescue Service
- North Wales Fire and Rescue Service
- South Wales Fire and Rescue Service

=== Crown Dependencies ===
Although not part of the United Kingdom, the Crown dependencies fire and rescue services operate in close cooperation with, and to the same standards as, the UK fire and rescue services. They are:

- Jersey Fire and Rescue Service
- Guernsey Fire and Rescue Service
- Isle of Man Fire and Rescue Service

== Other UK fire and rescue services ==
There are several specialised and private FRSs in the United Kingdom.

=== Airport fire services ===
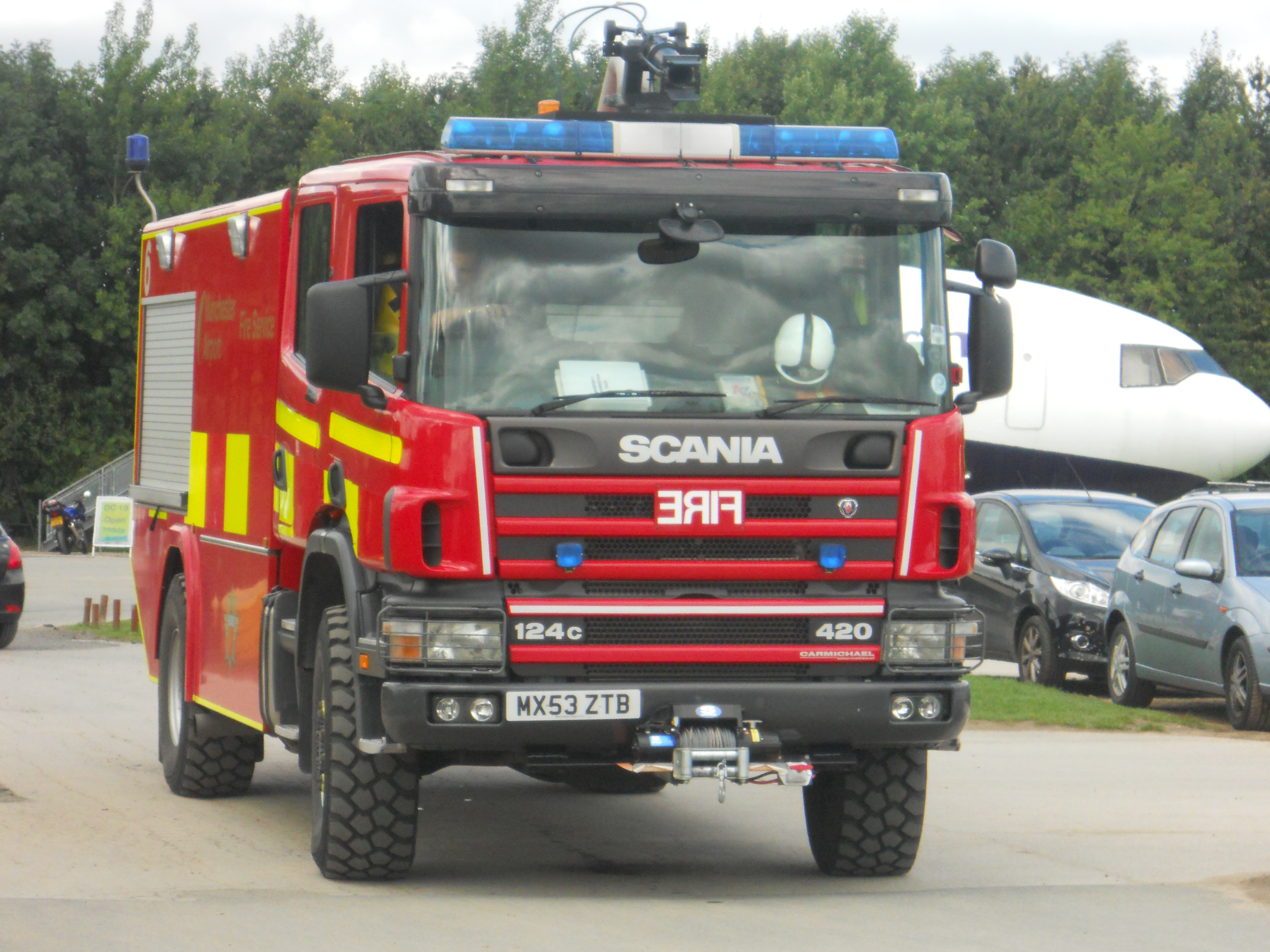
A fire appliance at Manchester Airport

Private airport fire services in the UK protect all categories of airports and aerodromes. They are usually referred to as Rescue and Fire Fighting Services (RFFS), or by the internationally recognised term Aircraft Rescue and Fire Fighting (ARFF). One of the biggest aviation fire services is operated by BAA. Non-BAA airports operate their own fire services to comply with legislation which states that airports must be provided with RFFS. One such example is London City Airport; its website describes the principal objective of an airport fire and rescue service: "as to save lives in the event of an aircraft accident or incident". The number and type of firefighting appliances based at an airport will be determined by the airport's category. Airports in the UK are categorised from 1 to 10. A category 10 airport caters for the biggest aircraft; the standards are determined by the Civil Aviation Authority.

=== Defence Fire and Rescue Service ===
The Ministry of Defence operates its own fire and rescue organisation. Originally this consisted of a civilian fire service known as the "Defence Fire Service" and the RAF Firefighting and Rescue Service. They were known collectively as the Ministry of Defence Fire Services, but in 2004 were formed into the Defence Fire and Rescue Service. This also includes private contractors brought in to protect sites such as small defence establishments.

The DFRS is the largest non geographical or local authority FRS in the UK, though the training, rank structure and equipment used are similar to that operated by their local authority fire service counterparts.

As a general rule the RAF personnel cover runways or airfields with particular expertise in defusing aircraft munitions, with the civilians covering domestic sites, but there were cross overs and both services could be called to airfield and domestic situations.

Both RAF and defence personnel can serve abroad both in peacetime and at war.

=== Civil nuclear ===
Sellafield and all operational nuclear power station operators have their own on-site fire service which is required by law under site nuclear licensing conditions.

=== Ports ===
Some large ports have their own fire service, such as Felixstowe.

== See also ==
- Fire appliances in the United Kingdom
- Salvage Corps
- Fire Service College
