= His Majesty's Chief Inspector of Fire Services =

Official of the UK government

Agency overview
- Agency executive: Andy Cooke, Chief Inspector
- Parent department: His Majesty’s Inspectorate of Constabulary and Fire & Rescue Services (HMICFRS)
- Website: https://www.justiceinspectorates.gov.uk/hmicfrs

The title and job role of His Majesty's Chief Inspector of Fire and Rescue Services in England, Scotland and Wales is combined with that known as Chief Fire and Rescue Adviser (CFRA, or Government Fire and Rescue Adviser) appointed by the devolved and national governments of the United Kingdom.

Despite holding both titles simultaneously the roles of "HM Chief Inspector of Fire and Rescue Services", and that of "Fire and Rescue Adviser" differ slightly. There is currently an HMCI in England, Wales, and Scotland – all of whom are also fire and rescue advisers to their respective governments.

In his or her political capacity as "Fire and Rescue Adviser" the post holder is responsible for advising their respective UK governments on all matters concerning the fire and rescue service in their jurisdiction.

As His Majesty's Chief Inspector, the post holder is responsible for auditing of all the local authority fire services in their jurisdiction to ensure they meet strict performance criteria and targets laid out by the government.

== Chief fire and rescue adviser ==
The CFRA for England is Peter Holland, the former chief fire officer of Lancashire Fire and Rescue Service. Previously, he served as the UK's chief fire and rescue adviser until 2020. This role has since become defunct.

The role of CFRA also includes additional responsibilities to HM Government. The CFRA is the most senior fire and rescue service adviser to the government, advising on policy, procedures, and legislative changes affecting the UK fire services. The devolved administrations consider and adopt UK policies and procedures where applicable.

Each inspectorate (England, Wales and Scotland) reports on the activities of the public fire and rescue services in the UK as well as the Defence Fire and Rescue Service, which is operated by the Ministry of Defence, on a non-statutory basis. Airport fire authorities are inspected by the Civil Aviation Authority.

The HMFSI's equivalent in Scotland is His Majesty's Fire Service Inspectorate for Scotland.

== Background ==
In February 2007, the UK government announced it was setting up a new unit to advise ministers on fire and rescue issues and creating the CFRA role, confirming in May the same year that Sir Ken Knight had been appointed to the position. In October 2007, Knight left the London Fire Brigade to start his new role. The announcement was made by the then fire minister Angela Smith. The purpose of the unit and its adviser is to "provide ministers and civil servants with independent professional advice on fire and rescue issues". The chief fire and rescue adviser also retains the historic title of HM Chief Inspector which was traditionally given to the head of Her Majesty's Inspectorate of Fire Service. The new unit and its chief adviser will replace HMFSI, its function is to advise ministers, COBR and other government departments; and local government. The CFRA reports to the Department for Communities and Local Government, which was renamed to Ministry of Housing, Communities and Local Government in 2018. The new units remit only extends to England and Wales.

Knight was succeeded in the role by Peter Holland on 28 January 2013.

The separate His Majesty's Fire Service Inspectorate for Scotland is under the leadership of its chief inspector, Steven Torrie.

== The role of the CFRA ==
The DfCLG has outlined the general functions of the CFRA, and the new unit:

- Advise ministers and senior staff on structure, organisation and performance, including equality, of fire and rescue services
- It will identify and disseminate good practice to fire and rescue services
- Continue the successful drive to reduce fire deaths, which have been halved in England over the last quarter of a century
- It will also advise and liaise with government, local authorities, professional bodies and other interested organisations on fire, rescue and resilience matters
- Is the umbrella organisation of the Crown Premises Inspection Group (CPIG). CPIG is the team of fire inspectors, appointed by the Secretary of State, to enforce the Regulatory Reform (Fire Safety) Order 2005 within Crown premises.

The detailed job description was made available to the public ahead of Sir Ken's appointment. It said the role of CFRA comes with a "substantial six figure package". The CFRA will have to set up the new unit, the last HM Chief inspector of Fire Services was Sir Graham Meldrum who retired in January 2007. The new post of CFRA has been created to reflect changes to the fire and rescue service in the UK brought about by the Fire and Rescue Services Act 2004, although it only applies to England and Wales. However, it is anticipated that the CFRA will advise the government on any major incident in the UK.

== See also ==
- Fire services in the United Kingdom
- His Majesty's Fire Service Inspectorate for Scotland
- Fire and Rescue Services Act 2004
- Women in firefighting
