= Chief fire officer =

Highest United Kingdom firefighter rank

Chief fire officer (CFO), formerly often just chief officer or county fire officer, is the highest rank in the fire and rescue services of the United Kingdom. There are currently 50 chief fire officers serving in the United Kingdom in charge of the local authority fire services. There is also a chief fire officer responsible for the Ministry of Defence Fire Services, which includes the Defence Fire and Rescue Service and the RAF Fire Service. Some UK airport fire services also designate their seniors officers as CFOs, though these officers rarely wear the same rank insignia as a local authority chief fire officer.

Other titles for this office can include county fire officer and chief executive, neither of which are in common use. Greater Manchester Fire and Rescue Service does, however, use the title of county fire officer and chief executive'. Kent Fire and Rescue Service's chief executive is in charge of maintaining the service; however, they are not a trained firefighter and cannot carry out frontline firefighting or incident command, and those roles are passed down to the director of operations. In the London Fire Brigade, the CFO is now known as the commissioner for fire and emergency planning. Chief fire officers in the United Kingdom are represented by the National Fire Chiefs Council (formerly the Chief Fire Officers Association); it has a separate section representing principal officers in fire and rescue services in Scotland.

In Scotland, the CFO was traditionally referred to as the firemaster, although this title was replaced by chief fire officer in Scottish brigades in 2006 when the Fire (Scotland) Act 2005 came into force. Under proposed changes, chief fire officers were to be renamed brigade managers in line with modernisation directives issued by the Department for Communities and Local Government. However, the title is unpopular and has so far not been used.

Most chief fire officers are former frontline firefighters who have risen through the ranks. A few brigades have, however, employed chief fire officers with other career backgrounds. South Wales Fire and Rescue Service is one of these who appointed Fin Monahan as Chief Fire Officer in 2024.

A chief fire officer is assisted by one deputy chief fire officer and a number of assistant chief fire officers, each of whom is delegated with commanding one or multiple areas of fire and rescue operations, such as training, vehicles and equipment, information technology, or human resources.

== Responsibilities ==
A CFO is responsible for the day-to-day command of the fire service in all areas. Ultimately however major policies and procedures have to be agreed and passed by the fire authority to whom the CFO reports. The fire authority is a committee of locally elected councillors. The committee's prime responsibility is to ensure that the fire service is run properly and responsibly. In simple terms, the chief officer is directly answerable to someone who represents the interests of the general public.

== His Majesty's Fire Service Inspectorate ==
Historically, many CFOs went on to join Her Majesty's Fire Service Inspectorate (HMFSI), formerly Her Majesty's Inspectorate of Fire Services, a government agency directly under the control of the Department for Communities and Local Government. Her Majesty's Inspectors are uniformed and considered to be superior to chief fire officers, although they have no power to directly command frontline fire crews.

In 2007, the HMFSI was replaced by the office of the Chief Fire and Rescue Adviser whose responsibilities extend to England and Wales. The Chief Fire and Rescue Advisor also retains the title as the de jure and de facto HM Chief Inspector of Fire Services. His Majesty's Fire Service Inspectorate for Scotland, however, continues its role and functions.

== New Zealand ==
According to the New Zealand Fire Service Act 1975, a chief fire officer in the New Zealand Fire Service commands a single fire district. This may be a volunteer fire brigade, with a single fire station, in an outer-urban or rural area, or it may consist of several fire stations in a metropolitan area, staffed by career firefighters. Auckland and Wellington, with their geographic sprawl, have their career stations divided into multiple districts - two in Wellington and five in Auckland. The other fourteen cities in New Zealand that have career firefighters are sufficiently compact geographically to allow each one to be a single fire district.

The rank badge for chief fire officers is an impeller between two ferns below two impellers. They wear white helmets with two blue stripes.

== See also ==
- Chief Fire Officers Association
- Fire chief
