= Airport rescue and firefighting services in the United Kingdom =

The provision of rescue and firefighting services (RFFS) at all airports and aerodromes in the United Kingdom is a requirement under British law and under international agreements set out by the International Civil Aviation Organization.

In the UK airport fire services are usually referred to as "rescue and firefighting services" in contrast to the term "fire and rescue service" (FRS) used by local authority fire services.

== Role ==
The principal objective of an airport fire and rescue service is "to save lives in the event of an aircraft accident or incident". This also applies to any other incident where life and property can be saved.

== Cover levels ==
The number and type of firefighting appliances based at an airport will be determined by the airport's category and task and resource analysis (TRA).

Airports in the UK are categorised from 1 to 10 dependent on the type and size of aircraft they handle.

A category 10 airport caters for the biggest aircraft, namely the Airbus A380, and therefore requires extensive rescue and firefighting cover as determined by the Civil Aviation Authority.

Often the RFFS will also be responsible for providing medical cover at the airport. The majority of UK airport firefighters are trained to emergency medical technician status.

== Response levels ==
The airport RFFS will respond to all aircraft emergencies within the airport's boundaries and will also respond to off-airport incidents that fall within a 6-degree cone from the end of each runway. If a special request has been made by the local authority, then dependent on circumstances, major foam tenders may be dispatched.

All incidents that occur outside of the airport boundary are the responsibility of the local authority fire and rescue service serving that location.

Whilst local authority FRS firefighters are trained to deal with aircraft accidents they do not receive the same level of training as airport firefighters whose expertise is more specialist.

== Other incidents ==
Like any modern FRS, airport crews will deal with road traffic collisions on airport property, as well as chemical spillages, fires/rescues in airport buildings and special service calls on-site if resourced with a form of domestic vehicle/facilities.

Some incidents are wherever possible passed onto the local authority fire service so that the airport crews can return to give fire cover to the runway.

Large airport fire services such as that based at Heathrow Airport have sufficient personnel and vehicles to deal with most emergencies on-site, although the LAFRS are called to most incidents as support and/or lead agency.

When an airport is located near a body of water such as a river, the airport fire service will be required to operate a water rescue service. London City Airport FRS, for example, are capable of performing advanced water rescue and is equipped with several rescue craft for dealing with aircraft incidents in the surrounding Docklands area.

== Fire appliances ==
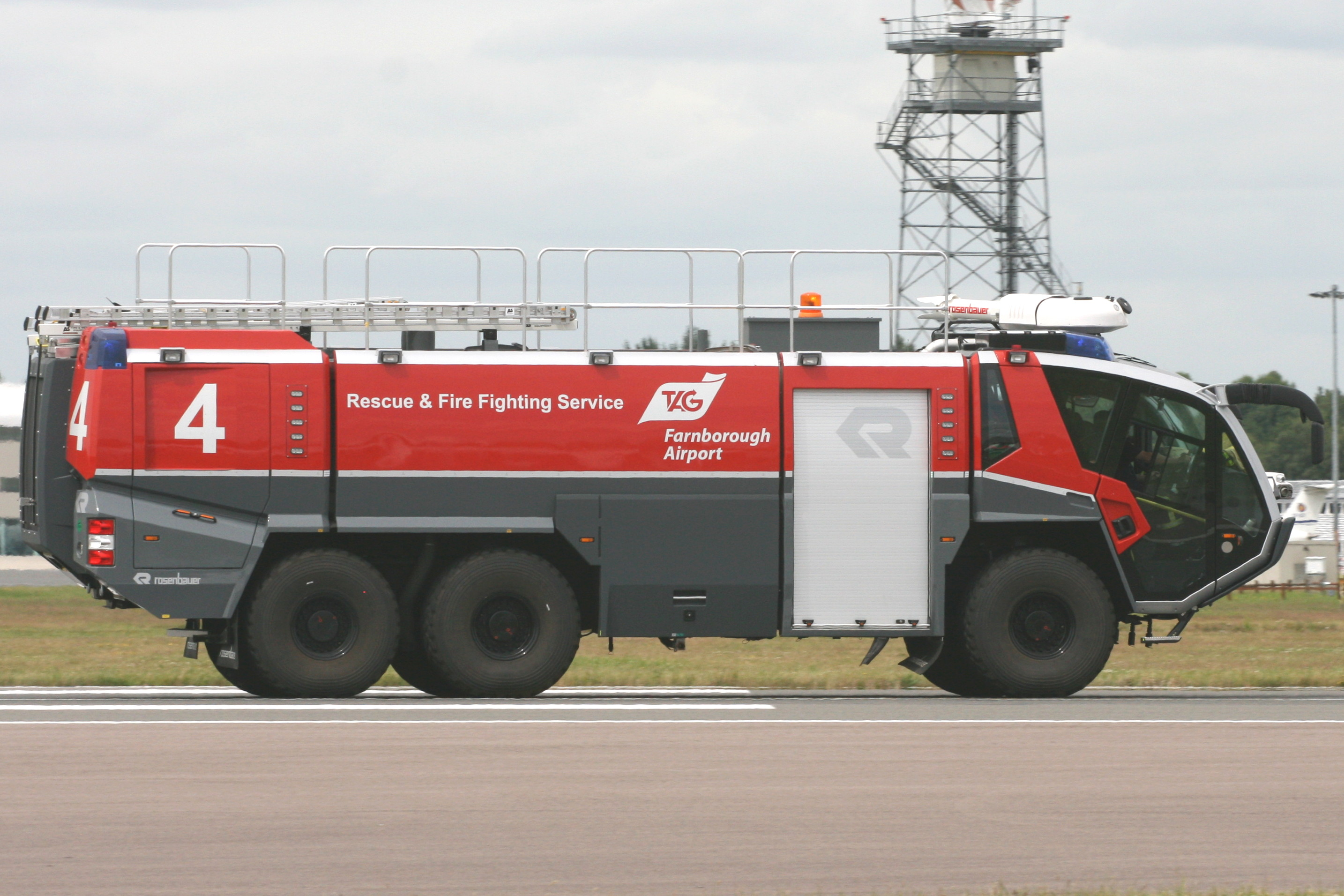
Rosenbauer Panther at Farnborough Airfield during the 2008 Farnborough Airshow

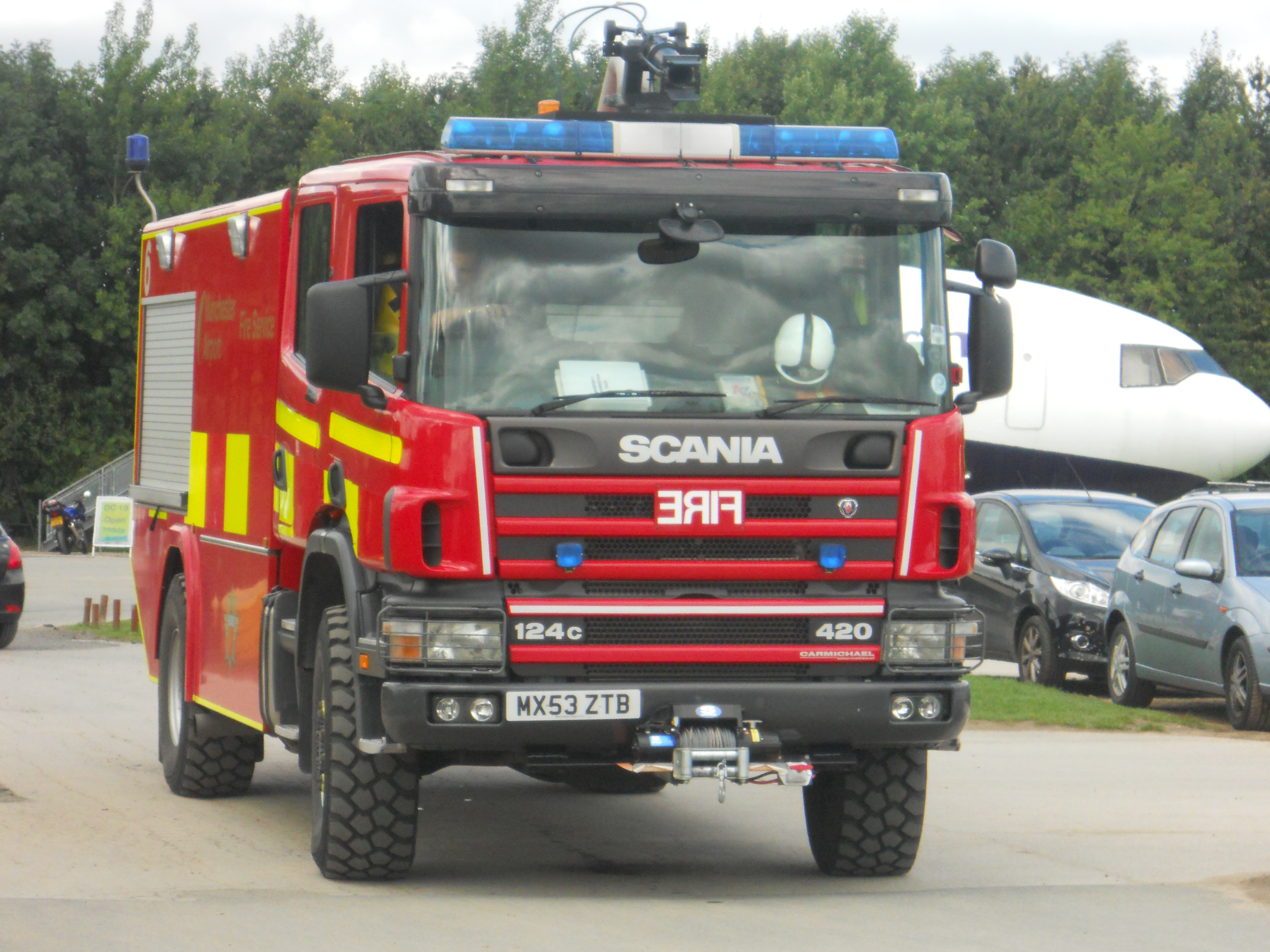
Manchester Airport Fire Engine - Scania P124C 420

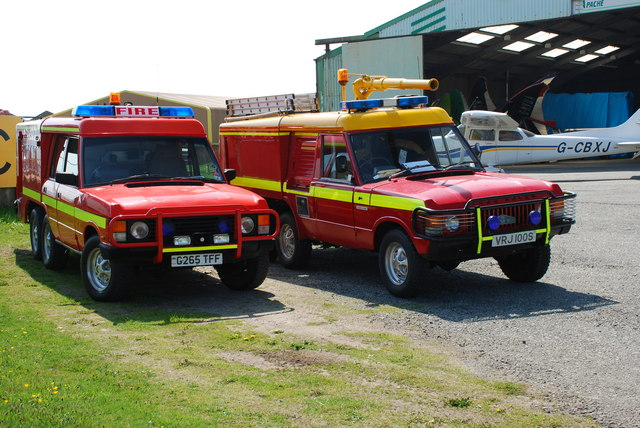
Two Land Rover-based fire tenders at Caernarfon Airport

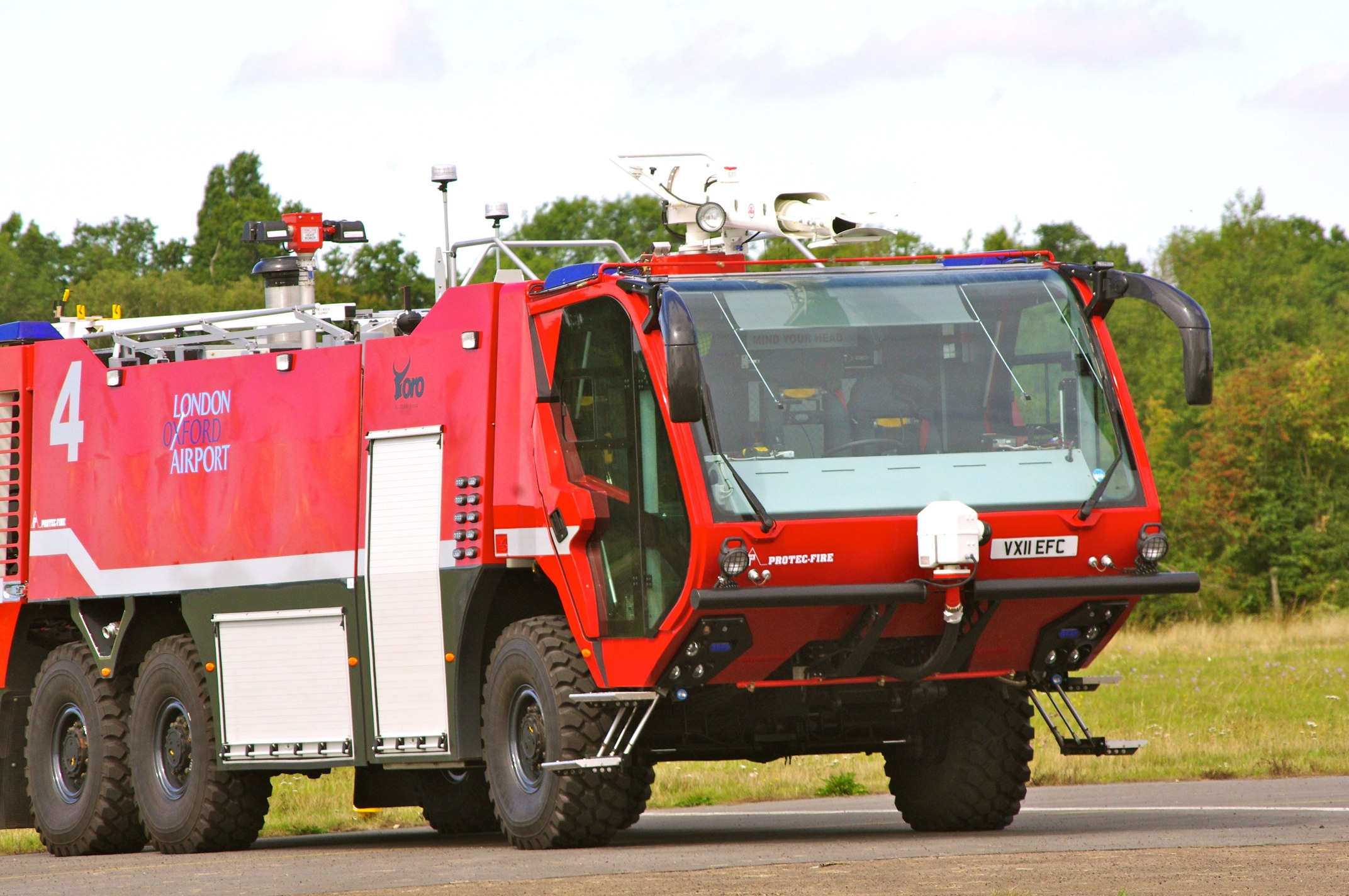
Crash tender at Oxford Airport

The number and type of firefighting appliances based at an airport will be determined by the airport's category. Airports in the UK are categorised from 1 to 10, dependent on the type and size of aircraft they handle, so a category 10 airport caters for the biggest aircraft and therefore requires extensive rescue and firefighting cover as determined by the TRA.

The fire appliances used by airport fire and rescue services normally consist of a fleet of large high-volume pumping vehicles capable of carrying an enormous amount of foam, or other fire extinguishing media and equipment on bulk, and then applying it under massive pressure and volume at the fire scene.

Most airport fire appliances are equipped with a roof-mounted high volume 'monitor' or 'nozzle' which can shoot fire extinguishing media huge distances. This means that an approaching fire appliance can begin tackling flames before it has arrived close to the scene of the fire.

A new type of roof-mounted monitor has been introduced in the UK; commonly known as a 'snozzle', it consists of an extensible boom capable of reaching the upper decks of the A380 to extinguish fires and is equipped with an infra-red camera, a variable output 'nozzle' and a device resembling a spike that can pierce the fuselage of an aircraft and deliver large amounts of water and foam inside the aircraft. This makes airport firefighting safer as firefighters do not need to set foot inside the aircraft to extinguish fires, as they can do it from the safety of their fire appliance using the snozzle.

Because of their sheer size, airport fire appliances require powerful engines to propel them. In fact, by law, the airport fire appliances should be capable of reaching any incident within the airport (including the predetermined boundaries outside of the airport) within three minutes (as set by the CAA).

Augmenting the capability of the huge fire appliances are vehicles known as either first attack/first strike or rapid intervention vehicles.

They are capable of arriving at the scene of an incident much quicker to begin rescue or firefighting operations. Such appliances vary from small Range Rover-based fire appliances to much larger truck-based pumps.

In larger airports, the rapid intervention vehicles and high volume pumping appliance (volumes up to 5,000 litres/minute) are supported by "domestic" type fire appliances similar to those used by the local authority FRS.

They are mainly used to respond to emergencies within the buildings around the airport, but also assist at aircraft incidents.

A typical category 10 airport, such as London Heathrow, operates out of two fire stations (located in the east and west of the airport) in order to achieve the three-minute response time to any location within the airport boundary. Each station operates a Scania domestic pump, two six-wheel-drive major foam tenders and a similar but smaller four-wheel-drive light foam tender. The Heathrow FRS also operates two Mitsubishi Shogun command vehicles out of the main fire station, a Scania hose-layer, several auxiliary vehicles (such as a personnel carrier) along with a couple of reserve foam tenders and, to meet category 10 requirements, a Scania 42 m aerial ladder platform to reach the upper deck of the A380.

== Training ==
ICAO Annex 14, § 9.2.34 directs that: All rescue and firefighting personnel shall be properly trained to perform their duties in an efficient manner and shall participate in live fire-drills commensurate with the types of aircraft and type of rescue and firefighting equipment in use at the aerodrome, including pressure-fed fuel fires.

Airport firefighters specialise in dealing with complex fires and rescues from aircraft. A great deal of their daily routine is spent training and drilling for such eventualities.

Unlike their local authority counterparts, airport firefighters have to re-qualify every four years to be deemed competent.

There are a number of reasons for this:

- Airport firefighters, due to the geographical size of the area they cover, do not respond to as many incidents as local authority firefighters.
- The four-yearly re-qualification policy acts to ensure continued competency in certain areas of the role in which they perform.
- Conversely local authority firefighter can demonstrate continued competency generally by the number of calls they deal with each year.
- Most airport firefighters are also trained emergency medical technicians to render medical care and first aid within the airport.
