= His Majesty's Fire Service Inspectorate for Scotland =

His Majesty's Fire Service Inspectorate (HMFSI) in Scotland operates as a body within, but independent of, the Scottish Government. The inspectorate exists to provide independent, risk based, and proportionate professional inspection of the Scottish Fire and Rescue Service (SFRS). It gives assurance to the Scottish public and Scottish Ministers that the SFRS is working in an efficient and effective way, and promotes improvement in the SFRS. It also provides independent, professional advice to Scottish government ministers and has functions in relation to non-domestic fire safety. The statutory basis of the inspectorate is set out in sections 43A to 43G of the Fire (Scotland) Act 2005. Its role was substantially amended by the Police and Fire Reform (Scotland) Act 2012 that came into effect on 1 April 2013. Its headquarters are at St Andrews House, Edinburgh.

== Chief inspector ==
HMFSI in Scotland operates under the leadership of HM chief inspector of the Scottish Fire and Rescue Service. The chief inspector is appointed by Order in Council. The current chief inspector is Robert Scott. It is general practice for chief inspectors to have previously served as a Principal Officer within a Fire and Rescue Service. Robert Scott served as an assistant chief officer within the Scottish Fire and Rescue Service until his retirement in 2017. He formed part of a small team that helped lead the reform of the fire and rescue services in Scotland. This process led to the creation of the new Scottish Fire and Rescue Service in 2013.

List of chief inspectors:

- Angus D Wilson 1948–1966
- James D McNicol 1967–1968
- John Jackson 1968–1978
- Paddy Watters 1979–1983
- Richard Knowleton 1984–1989
- Alex Winton 1989–1993
- Neil Morrison 1993–1999
- Dennis Davis 1999–2003
- Jeff Ord 2004–2007
- Keith MacGillivray 2008 (Interim)
- Brian Fraser 2008–2010
- Steven Torrie 2011–2016
- Martyn Emberson 2017–2018
- Simon Routh-Jones 2018–2021
- Robert D Scott 2021–present

== See also ==
- Scottish Government
- Fire services in the United Kingdom
- His Majesty's Inspectorate of Constabulary and Fire & Rescue Services (England, Wales and Northern Ireland)
