= King's Fire Service Medal =

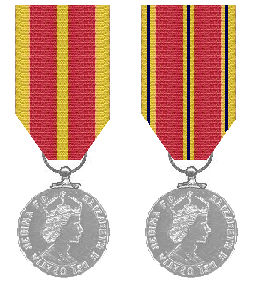
- KFSM ribbons for Gallantry (left) and Distinguished Service (right)
- Type: Medal
- Awarded for: 'acts of exceptional courage and skill at the cost of their lives' or for the 'exhibition of conspicuous devotion to duty'.
- Presented by: United Kingdom and Commonwealth
- Eligibility: Members of the Fire Services
- Post-nominals: KFSM (2022–present); QFSM (1954–2022)
- Established: 19 May 1954

Order of Wear
- Next (higher): King's Police Medal, for Gallantry (KFSM for gallantry); King's Police Medal, for Distinguished Service (KFSM for service)
- Next (lower): Royal West African Frontier Force Distinguished Conduct Medal (KFSM for gallantry); King's Ambulance Service Medal (KFSM for service)

The King's Fire Service Medal, introduced in 1954, is awarded to members of the fire services in the United Kingdom for distinguished service or gallantry. Originally also awarded by Commonwealth countries, most have now established their own awards, including Australia in 1988 (with the Australian Fire Service Medal) and New Zealand in 1996 (covered by the King's Service Medal).

Members of recognised fire brigades were eligible for the King's Police Medal from its creation in July 1909, with the award renamed the King's Police and Fire Services Medal in September 1940. In 1954 separate medals were established for the police and the Fire Service, with the Queen's Police Medal and the Queen's Fire Service Medal both instituted on 19 May 1954. Recipients from 1969 to 8 September 2022 may use the post-nominal letters “QFSM”. Recipients from 8 September 2022 may use the post-nominal letters "KFSM".

The award has two categories. The most common is the King's Fire Service Medal for Distinguished Service, predominantly awarded to senior officers (station officer and above). The equivalent medal for gallantry, the King's Fire Service Medal for Gallantry, can only be awarded posthumously and has, up to 2025, never been awarded, with members of the fire service also eligible for the George Cross, George Medal and the King's Gallantry Medal.

Awards are announced in The Gazette. There is provision for the forfeiture of the award in the event of a recipient later being convicted of a criminal offence.

== Design ==
- The medal is silver and 36 millimetres in diameter, with the ribbon suspended from a ring.
- The obverse bears the profile of the reigning monarch, Elizabeth II to 2023, then Charles III.
- The reverse shows a standing figure with a sword and shield, with an inscription of "For Distinguished Fire Service" around the medal's edge. The gallantry version has the words "For Gallantry" in the exergue.
- The name of the recipient is inscribed on the rim of the medal.
- The 1.38 inches (35 mm) wide ribbon is of red with three yellow stripes. The King's Fire Service Medal for Gallantry has a single thin dark blue stripe running through the centre of each yellow stripe.

== See also ==
- King's Police Medal
- British and Commonwealth orders and decorations
