= Chief Fire Officers Association =

UK professional body

The Chief Fire Officers Association (CFOA) is the professional body representing senior fire officers in the United Kingdom. The organisation used to be known as the Chief and Assistant Chief Fire Officers Association, it was formed in 1974 following local government re-structuring. Since 2017, the operational activity of the CFOA has been delivered by the new National Fire Chiefs Council.

The CFOA website says, "CFOA's Aim is to continue as the professional voice of the UK Fire Service, assisting and supporting our members to fulfil their leadership role in improving the well being of local communities in all matters relating to the Fire Services' activities."

Membership of the CFOA is open to any UK-based senior fire officer above the rank of assistant chief officer, in addition to chief fire officer, sometimes now known as brigade managers or, in Scotland, Fire Master. The CFOA acts as a collective 'voice' for the fire services in the United Kingdom on issues such policy, training, legislative, and fire safety issues.

== CFOA and FiReControl ==
As one example of setting policy, the CFOA was involved in the planning process for response times for the now-abandoned FiReControl project. Its aim was to consolidate the number of control rooms that answer emergency calls in England from 46 to nine, by 2009. As envisaged, the new system would have seen 98% of calls answered within five seconds, exceeding the CFOA's own policy.

== Policy areas ==
The home page of the CFOA's website has a list of current policies and initiatives, with information and press releases attached. Some of the organisation's policy areas are summarised as follows (2006):

- New fire safety laws, (The Regulatory Reform (Fire Safety) Order 2006)
- Department for Communities and Local Government policy on building regulations
- London Regional Resilience Forum, policy document on 7 July attacks
- Warning on electric blankets
- Relaxation of air security
- Home Office document on 7 July attacks

== See also ==
- Chief Fire and Rescue Adviser
- Fire Service College
- Fire services in the United Kingdom
- Women in firefighting
