= Women in firefighting =

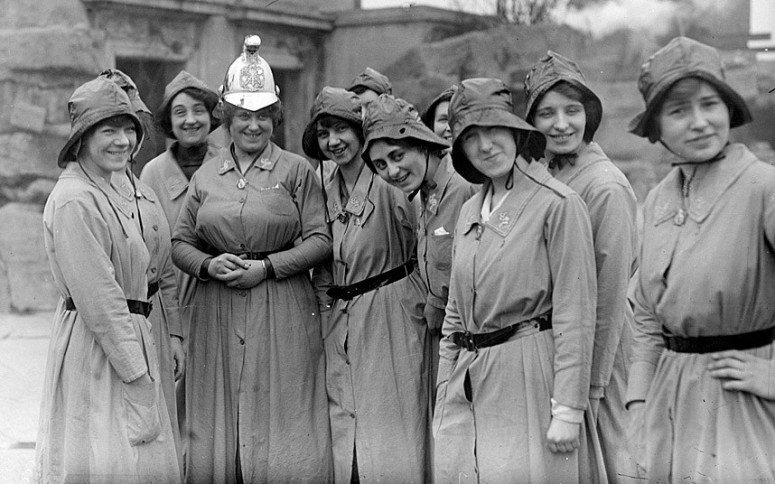
Several female firefighters of the Basque Region pose for a photograph in 1916.

The role of women in firefighting has been subject to significant changes over the years; many ancient civilizations had firefighting groups which accepted women, but by the advent of organized firefighting in the 18th century, gender roles had changed such that firefighting was considered an unsuitable profession for women. Despite this, many women continued to work informally in firefighting roles, and in parts of the world were able to break into organized fire departments, especially during times of war. With the advent of the second-wave feminism movement in the 1960s, many women began to push for anti-employment discrimination legislation which would permit them to work as firefighters, which was often met with considerable opposition from often change-resistant fire services.

Today, women work in both support and frontline firefighting roles in both career and volunteer fire departments worldwide, and in many countries have held high-ranking positions such as fire chief or chief fire officer. Despite this, female firefighters continue to face significant challenges and discrimination not faced by male firefighters, including employment discrimination, misogyny and sexual harassment, and facilities and equipment which are inaccessibly designed; as a result, women generally make up fewer than 20% of total firefighters even in the countries where they are the most well-represented, especially in career departments.

== History ==
Many ancient civilizations had a form of organized firefighting. One of the earliest recorded fire services was in Ancient Rome. The Aboriginal Australians had been managing and responding to wildfires for thousands of years, with women being involved.

Firefighting became more organized from the 18th century onwards with the rise of insurance companies and then with the rise of government fire services in the 19th century. In 1818, Molly Williams was recorded as being the first female firefighter in the United States; as a slave in New York City, she joined a volunteer engine company. Young women in boarding houses in the United Kingdom were taught fire drills, including high ladder rescues. During World War II, women served in the wartime fire services of the United Kingdom, Australia and New Zealand both in support and frontline roles.

As a result of the second-wave feminism movement and subsequent anti-employment discrimination legislation, official obstacles to women were removed from the 1970s onwards. The first female career firefighter in the United Kingdom (Mary Joy Langdon) was recruited in 1976, while the first in New Zealand (Anne Barry) joined in 1981. In response to this change, many fire departments began requiring recruits to pass overly restrictive fitness tests, which became an unofficial barrier to women joining. This led to court cases in a number of countries.

Nevertheless, the percentage of women recruited by fire departments has been low. In the UK, women make up 5% of firefighters which is far less than the percentage for police officers (29%), paramedics (38%) and military personnel (10%). A report by the London Fire Brigade found that discouraging factors included the portrayal of firefighting in the media, a lack of information available to young girls and unrealistic ideas about the role. Other issues include shift patterns that are not suitable for mothers with young children.

== Terminology ==
For much of the 20th century, firefighting was a male-dominated or exclusively male profession. As such, firefighters were commonly called "firemen", an informal title still used by some civilians today. The title "firefighter" has become the universally accepted terminology in NFPA training materials and is used by English speaking professionals and trained volunteers as both the basic rank and overall job title that is often paired with the addition of a firefighter's EMT certification level (e.g., "Firefighter-Paramedic Jane Doe").

== Challenges ==
Since women have only begun to be widely hired or accepted as firefighters in the last few decades, many fire services have had to make difficult adjustments. In many places, the fire service is steeped in tradition and formalized, paramilitary relationships. A 1998 article in Fire Engineering noted that firefighters tend to form tight-knit communities which value "strength, courage, and loyalty" but can be "resistant to change". Even if women are socially accepted members of the fire service, it is often justified on the basis of gendered assumptions that they will bring more balanced decision making and nurturing qualities to a team of firefighters, as opposed to simple equality of opportunity.

=== Health ===
In 2017, a study of female firefighters' occupational stress in the U.S. found that 40% of those surveyed had engaged in binge drinking in the previous month, and 16.5% screened positive for problem drinking. According to the study, "problem drinkers were more than 2.5 times as likely to have been diagnosed with a depressive disorder or to have symptoms of post-traumatic stress." Those with less than seven years of service were the most likely to report issues with drinking.

In Canada, a lack of health coverage is often an issue for female firefighters in certain provinces. Although many cancers are covered as known occupational risks because of overexposure to fire, smoke, and toxic fumes, as of 2017, breast cancer was not covered nationwide.

Although women in the fire service are generally more healthy and fit than their male coworkers as well as women in the wider population, they experience higher rates of miscarriage and preterm births. This may be linked to occupational hazards such as environmental toxins, heavy lifting, and irregular shift work. In 2012, the International Association of Firefighters in the United States recommended that all fire departments create policies on pregnancy and/or maternity leave, but a 2018 study found that nearly a quarter of female firefighters reported that their departments had no such policies.

=== Facilities and equipment ===
One major hurdle to entrance into firefighting for women has been a lack of appropriate facilities; the issue of sleeping quarters and bathing areas had to be solved before women could participate fully in firefighting as an occupation and as a culture, as communal showers and open bunk halls were designed for men only. Today, fire stations in most countries, as public entities, must either follow gender equity law or face judicial injunctions and thus they are now designed to accommodate firefighters of both genders; however, some female firefighters continue to report gender-related accessibility issues.

A pan-Canadian study found that equipment, services and resources for female firefighters are often inadequate. Gear is often not made for women, and offsite, women may lack proper facilities for feminine hygiene needs.

=== Discrimination ===
Women were banned from working as firefighters in many countries at many times. For example, from 1945 to 1947 in Australia, pre- war bans on single and married women being employed in certain industries including firefighting were reinstated as part of demobilisation.

The second-wave feminism movement of the 1960s led to increased legal challenges against bans on employment of female firefighters. For example, in 1979, communications centre worker Anne Barry applied to join the New Zealand Fire Service as a career firefighter and her application was rejected on the grounds of gender, but in 1981 she won her two year battle with the Fire Service Commission and was allowed to apply to join the NZFS as a career firefighter, passing the recruit course that same year ranking 3rd overall in her cohort. Newly imposed and overly restrictive fitness tests introduced by fire services in response were also subject to legal challenges; in 1982, Brenda Berkman won a lawsuit against the New York City Fire Department over its restrictive fitness test - she and 40 others then joined as the department's first female firefighters. A similar lawsuit led to the Supreme Court of Canada ruling in 1999 (in the case British Columbia (Public Service Employee Relations Commission) v. BCGSEU) that fire departments could not use restrictive fitness tests unless they could justify the need for them.

A 2015 study on women in the wildland firefighting profession in Australia found that 55% reported witnessing gender discrimination, while 45% reported experiencing it themselves.

There have been occasional charges of some departments lowering standards so that they could hire more women. In 2005, Laura Chick, the Los Angeles City Controller, stated in a report that LA Fire Department Chief William R. Bamattre lowered physical requirements for female recruits and ordered that women be passed even if they failed their tests. However, many female firefighters reject any form of accommodation or special treatment, in part because they wish to prove themselves in the same way as their male counterparts, and in part because they fear it will make them a target for harassment.

=== Sexual harassment ===
Studies have found that women working in male-dominated professions, such as firefighting, experience more sexual harassment that those working in traditionally female-aligned professions. This increased rate of harassment is worsened further when women are in the minority, as they often are in the fire service, because the majority group in such circumstances tends to view those in the minority as token representatives of their group rather than individuals.

In a 1995 survey conducted by the organization Women in the Fire Service, 551 women in fire departments across the United States were asked about their experiences with sexual harassment and other forms of job discrimination. In response, 88% of fire service women responded that they had experienced some form of sexual harassment at some point in their fire service careers or volunteer time, with nearly 70% of the women in the survey said that they were experiencing ongoing harassment at the time of the study. Of the 339 women who indicated that they had complained about harassment, only one-third (115 women) listed positive-only outcomes (such as investigating/taking care of the problem and disciplining the harasser), while 26% said that they were retaliated against for having reported the incident.

Many Canadian female firefighters admit to experiencing some levels of systemic gendered violence such as sexual harassment and assault, which includes groping and being solicited for sexual services. Female firefighters who experience harassment have been found to be more hesitant to report it because they fear negative consequences such as exclusion and the exacerbation of the harassment. Many female firefighters have reported avoiding feminine apparel such as high heels, dresses, and makeup when around their male coworkers, for fear of being hypersexualized and becoming the target of such violence. For example, in 2016 a Toronto Fire Services male firefighter was charged with two counts of sexual assault and one count of assault with a weapon in connection with his harassment of a female coworker.

In 1995, a nationwide US study found that the majority of female firefighters that experience sexual harassment do not report it to their superiors, in many instances because the supervisor was involved in or already knew about the behaviour. When harassment was reported, no formal action was taken in the majority of cases. In that same study, female firefighters who have been sexually harassed are significantly more likely than their peers to report experiencing job stress.

== By country ==
=== Australia ===
The Aboriginal Australians developed techniques for managing bushfires in the 60,000 years before the arrival of European settlers, with women being involved.

==== Amazon Ladies Fire Brigade ====
Excluding these indigenous precursors, the first all-female firefighting crew was recruited in 1901 in Armidale, New South Wales. It was formed in response to a fire at Cunningham House in the same town. Known as The Amazons, this volunteer crew complimented the all-male paid firefighting crew, and was the first example in Australia of male and female crews doing routine fire drills together using the same equipment. Station Officer Minnie Webb was the first female Captain in Australia. The creation of the Amazon Ladies Fire Brigade and their operational and dress uniforms was inspired by Captain Webb of the paid firefighting brigade in Armidale. Captain J.T.A. Webb became captain in 1898. He held this position until his death on 17 May 1924. He formed the first women's fire brigade in the early 1900s and also instructed the all-female brigade at the New England Girls School and the fire squad at The Armidale School in October 1923. Webb immigrated from England, where he had seen the trained female fire responders that were common at all-female British boarding schools (see United Kingdom on this page). The Amazons was a one-off local initiative and the Webb children were recruited into both the male and female brigades. The model was not adopted elsewhere in Australia. However, the Dubbo Dispatch and Independent Bulletin of 1905 reported that the Dubbo Brigades had attended in Dubbo with 'upwards of 70 Brigades' from across NSW, and an 'exhibition of hose and ladder...and life-saving' had been performed by the Amazon Ladies Brigade

Unlike Britain, Australian jurisdictions did not establish voluntary female brigades during WWI, and despite great interest in the Amazons from 1901 to 1905, no other jurisdictions took up the idea. Captain Minnie Webb went on to become a nurse serving in WWI.

==== Women's fire auxiliaries in World War II ====
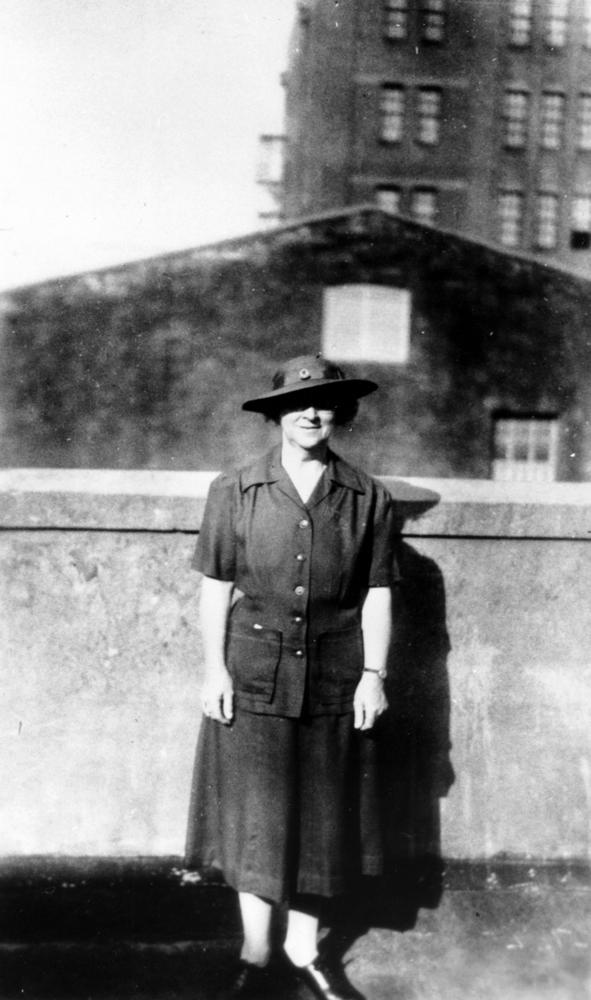
Flo McKenzie, a member of the wartime Women's Fire Service of Queensland, wears her duty uniform c.1940.

As was the case in Britain, women's fire auxiliaries were established in World War II in most jurisdictions in Australia to fill vacancies created when male firefighters enlisted in the war. Tasmania was ordering uniforms for the Women's Fire Auxiliary in January 1940. On 20 August 1941, the Tasmania Women's Fire Auxiliary were part of a parade (a march-past) for Prime Minister of the United Kingdom Winston Churchill. Queensland established a Women's Fire Auxiliary in October 1941. Their duties were to include "driving and trailing vehicles to fires, repairing hoses, operating chemical extinguishers, looking after canteens, and extinguishing incendiary bombs". The Forestry Department of Western Australia recruited an all-female fire crew in Sawyers Valley. Initially only employed on weekends, they became full-time. In addition to fire suppression they carried out fuel reduction burning, firebreak maintenance, fire spotting and upgrading bush phone lines. In 1942 the WA Fire Auxiliary, made of up men and women, gave a demonstration of their skills. In the same year (1942) the Board of Fire Commissioners of NSW established the Women's Fire Auxiliary. Women served as volunteer firefighters in urban and rural locations across Australia and New Zealand. In New South Wales, recruitment took place in Wagga Wagga, Newcastle Wollongong and Broken Hill. A uniform, including a helmet, dress uniform hat, operational overalls and dress uniform jacket was provided. The Australian War Memorial has photos of the NSWFB uniform. Dorothy Barrett, organiser and Chief of the NSW Women's Fire Auxiliary was photographed in 1946 in uniform No book has been written about the female chiefs of the Women's Fire Auxiliaries, though Trove has established a 1947 press cuttings book. Also in 1942, South Australia established a Women's Fire Auxiliary and recognition was given to the vital role women were to play in emergency response. At the 2006 Women in Fire Fighting Conference, Merilyn Childs curated a reproduction of historic uniforms.

In the post-war era, women remained unable to join fire services as paid firefighters, though there was a growth of local women's auxiliaries across Australia. In the 21st century, these women would be seen as providing operational support and contributing to community fire safety, but in the post-war era they were often portrayed and respected as tea ladies and sandwich makers. The women who volunteered made an important contribution to fire preparedness and response.

==== Modern developments ====
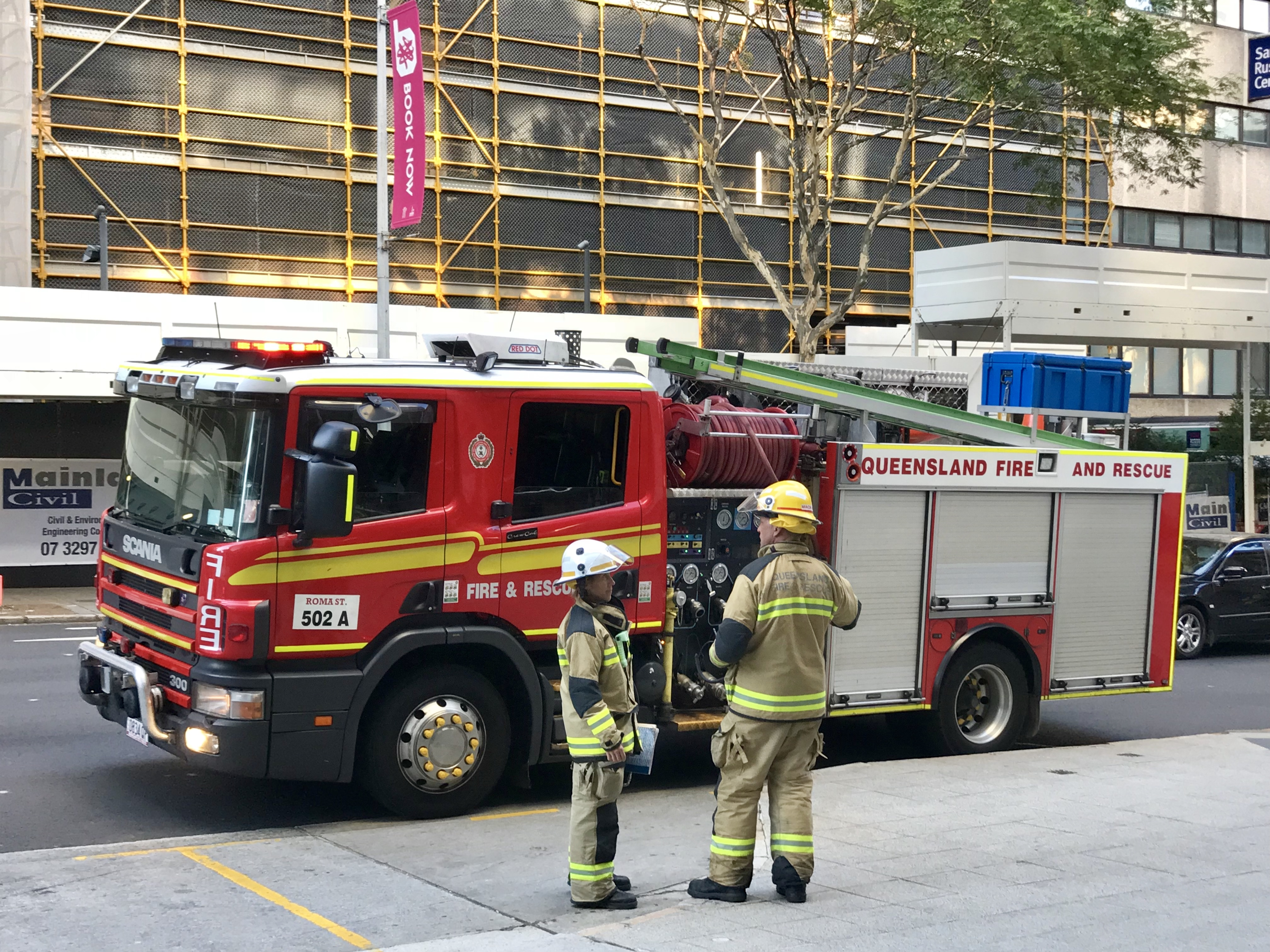
A female firefighter of the Queensland Fire and Rescue Service speaks to a male station officer at a fireground in 2018.

After the passage of the Sex Discrimination Act 1984, official limits on women joining were removed. In 1985, Heather Barnes, Denise Butcher, Dawn Maynard and Allison Meenahan joined New South Wales Fire Brigade (NSWFB) as Australia's first paid career firefighters. In 1998, the NSWFB (now Fire and Rescue NSW) appointed its first female station officers.

The first National Women in Firefighting Forum (thereafter known as WIFF) was held in 2005 at Sydney Airport with the theme of "Firing Up Women". It was opened with a keynote address by the Sex Discrimination Commissioner Pru Goward. A second conference was held in 2006 and included New Zealand female firefighters. The theme was "Same but Different". The first timeline of women in firefighting was created. A vote was unanimously recorded to establish a women in firefighting association run by and for female firefighters, and out of this vote Women and Firefighting Australasia (WAFA) was born. In 2007 the first Board of WAFA was established with Susan Courtney as its president.

Prior to 2005, most research, including health, uniform and risk research assumed all cohorts were male, with the exception of Robyn Cooper's 1997 work. From 2005 onwards, some research has been done into roles and challenges for female firefighters in Australia.

In 2006, Childs reported that less than 5% of any fire service in Australia was made up of full-time paid female firefighters, and also reported a web survey under the title "Not just fitting in". Ainsworth et al (2013) argued that in 2006 indicated that out of 33,659 volunteer firefighters, 3,798 (11%) were women. In 2011, this number had increased to 5,466 (14%). In 2015 a report by Women in Firefighting Australasia found that no fire agency had succeeded in improving the overall percentage about 5%. However, while overall total percentages had not been exceeded between 2006 and 2015, overall percentages across all fire services had improved. For example, the Northern Territory had improved from 0% to 2%.

The percentage of career female firefighters remain at or below 5% of Australian fire services agencies, despite the history and activism noted above. Controversy remains acute. Allegations of sexism and bullying remain. There has also been a movement towards setting physical standards based on evidence of what is necessary.

==== Notable moments ====
- 1901 – The Amazons were formed in Armidale, New South Wales
- 1941–1945 – Women's Fire Auxiliaries were established across Australian jurisdictions
- 1945–1947 – Pre-war bans on single and married women being employed in certain industries including firefighting, were reinstated as part of demobilisation
- 1950-70s – Many Women's Fire Auxiliaries were formed, such as the Morphett Vale and Districts EFS Ladies Auxiliary; and Burnside CFA SA Women who took a more active role learning basic firefighting and the operation of the radio room
- 1977 – The 1977 Anti-Discrimination Act of the New South Wales Parliament was passed
- 1984 – The federal 1984 Sex Discrimination Act was passed
- 1985 – Heather Barnes, Denise Butcher, Dawn Maynard, and Allison Meenahan became the first female firefighters in the NSW Fire Brigade
- 1987 – Adrienne Clarke became South Australia's first female professional firefighter with the Metropolitan Fire Service
- 1988 – The induction of the first professional female firefighters in the Metropolitan Fire Brigade of Melbourne, Victoria took place in September (names of women?)
- 1992 – Melanie Goehr is appointed as the first professional female firefighter in the Northern Territory Fire and Rescue Service
- 1994 – Kristen Appel is appointed the leader of an all-female firefighting team of NT Park Rangers in charge of Arltunga Historical Reserve
- 1998 – Vicki Hunter, Sally Foote, and Dawn Maynard become the first female Station Officers in NSW Fire Brigade
- 1999 – Shameena Wells becomes the first Muslim-Australian woman to win first place at the NSW Fire Brigade field day held at the NSW Fire Museum in Penrith
- 2000 – 5 female firefighters of the NSW National Parks and Wildlife Service are awarded a national Firefighting medal (names of women?)
- 2001 – The first all-female and all-First Nations fire crew was established by the Country Fire Authority at Lake Tyers, Victoria
- 2002 – The first female Aircraft Rescue and Firefighting graduates were deployed by Airservices Australia (names of 2 women?)
- 2004 – Jennifer Filmer was awarded a Medal of the Order of Australia for 30 years of service to rural firefighting in Victoria
- 2004 – Viviene Raffaele was awarded the Australasian Fire Service Medal for services to firefighting in the ACT
- 2005 – The first Women in Firefighting Forum (WIFF) is convened
- 2005 – The WA Branch of the United Firefighters Union replaces the word 'fireman' with 'firefighter' on their website
- 2006 – The first Australasian Women in Firefighting Conference is convened
- 2008 – Michelle Young is appointed as the first female Station Officer of the Queensland Fire and Rescue Service
- 2014 – Charmaine Sellings, Rhonda Thorpe and Katrina Mullet, long time members of the all-female and all-First Nations CFA Lake Tyers Brigade, are awarded 10-year service medals
- 2016 – For the first time, women make up 50% of the recruits graduating class of Fire and Rescue NSW

=== Austria ===
A female fire brigade was formed in 1912, with an initial recruitment of 60 women. Women were admitted to volunteer fire brigades in 1978, and as professionals in 1993.

=== Canada ===
The oldest fire department and fire insurance company as well as the longest-serving firefighters in Canada originated in Nova Scotia. The terms "smoke-eaters" and "leather lungs" were used to describe firemen who had no need to come out for fresh air, and this success was attributed to male facial hair that was thought to act as a "watery sponge" that held fresh air. Since they lacked this facial hair, women were unable to earn these titles.

In the late 1800s, many fire halls, including ones in Nova Scotia, united to compete in sports and physical challenges relating to fire fighting. However, it would not be until over one hundred years later, during the feminist movements of the 1960s, that the absence of women in contact sports was questioned.

A "boys' club" culture existed in many fire departments, as the majority of the firefighters were white males. The firefighters were held to strict standards and were fined (or could even be fired) for spitting on the floor, being late to meetings, and being drunk on or off duty. However, many of the firefighters would support each other by not reporting another member when they were intoxicated.

In 1999, the Supreme Court of Canada ruled in British Columbia (Public Service Employee Relations Commission) v. BCGSEU that a mandatory fitness test for those seeking to become firefighters in British Columbia unfairly discriminated against women. The test had been based on the physiology of male firefighters. The Court ruled that employers must show that any required workplace tests are necessary, and that there has been some effort to accommodate individuals.

Female-focused camps to train young women in firefighting skills have been created by fire departments in Ottawa and London, Ontario, and have led to similar camps being established in the U.S.

Currently, only 3% of firefighters in Canada are women. Many female firefighters have reported facing resistance when they try to move up in rank, feeling the need to be overqualified in order to compensate for their gender and to prove that they were hired based on merit and not simply an attempt at diversification. Female firefighters also report experiencing bullying, harassment, and sexual harassment on the job.

=== France ===
Françoise Mabille was the first female firefighter in France, joining the volunteer fire brigade of Barentin, Normandy in 1976. She later became a full-time firefighter in 1994, and was retired in 2011.

In 2015, 3% of firefighters were women, with 6.4% of these women holding the title of fire officer.

=== Germany ===
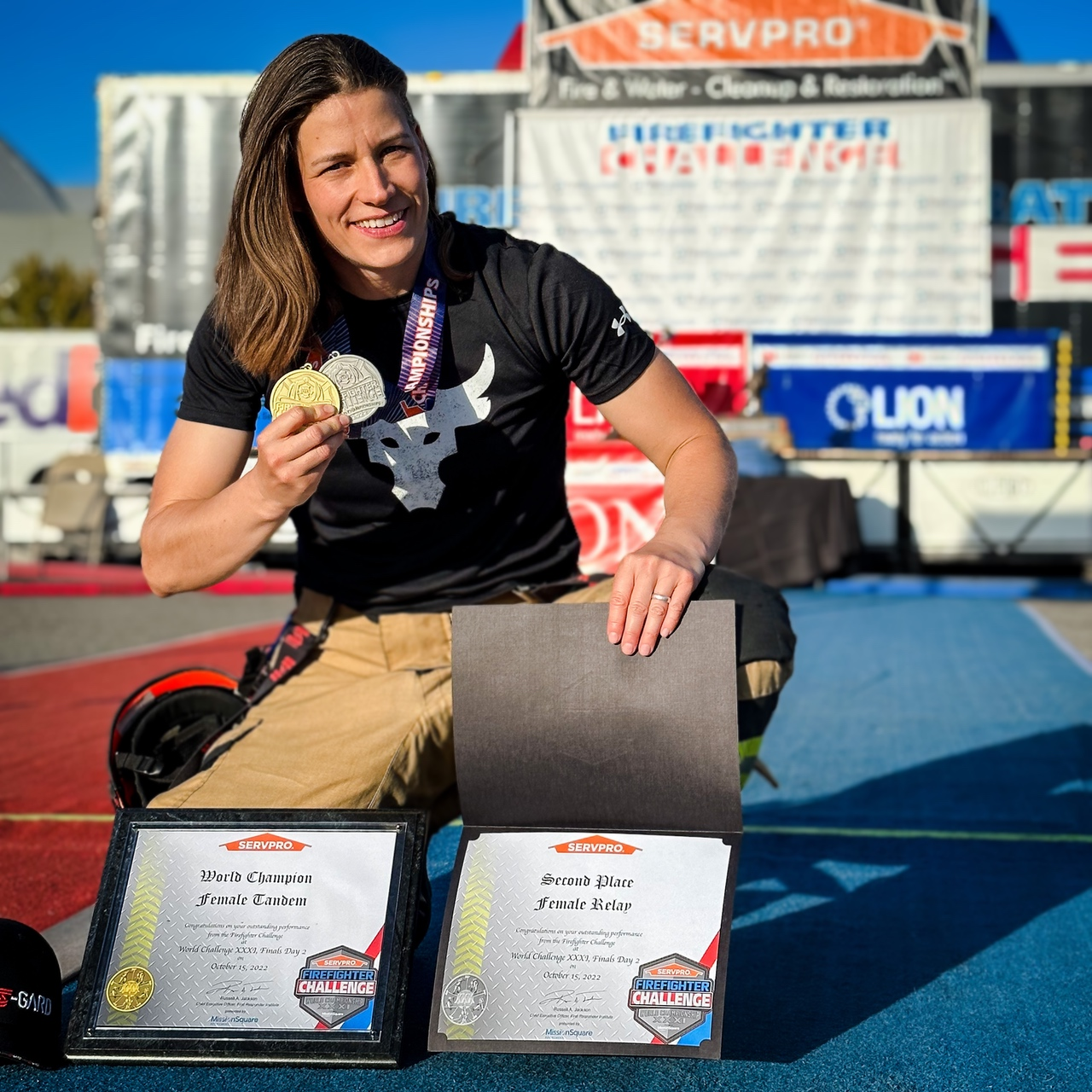
German firefighter Marie-Cathérine Schumann showing her medals from the 2022 World Firefighter Challenge.

Volunteer female firefighters worked in Berlin and Breslau during World War I but ceased at the end of the war. Women were again recruited during World War II, especially as drivers. This continued until 1955 when they had all been replaced by men. In the German Democratic Republic (GDR), women were extensively used both in support roles and as frontline firefighters. Women continued to take up all roles in the 1990s. The first recorded female firefighter in Berlin was Tanja Grunwald, in April 1994. Female professional firefighters now number about 1,000 (2.3%), with approximately 80,000 volunteers (10%).

=== Norway ===
The first documented female firefighters in Norway joined the fire services during the 1980s. In 2011, 3.7% of the Norwegian firefighters were women.

=== Hong Kong ===
The Hong Kong Fire Services Department started recruiting women for control and ambulance staff in the 1980s; however, the first firewoman was not hired until 1994.

As of 2003, there were 111 uniformed females, but only 8 were operational firefighters.

=== India ===
In 2002 Harshini Kanhekar became the first women firefighter in India.

In 2003, the Tamil Nadu Fire and Rescue Services permitted women to join and appointed Priya Ravichandran as a Divisional Fire Officer, making her one of the first female fire officers in the country, and the first one to win the Anna Medal for Bravery. In the same service Meenakshi Vijayakumar has attended more than 400 incidents and in 2013 was awarded the President's Fire Service Medal for Gallantry.

In 2009, a proposal was mooted in the Municipal Corporation Chandigarh to allow women into the fire services.

In 2012, the Mumbai Fire Brigade inducted five women firefighters, making them the first in the history of the organisation.

In 2013, the department inducted its second batch of women firefighters.

=== Iran ===
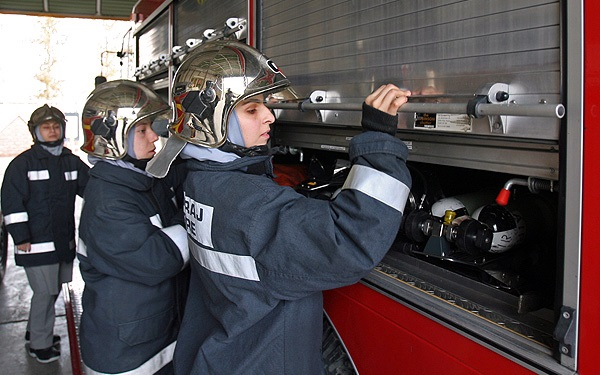
Iranian firefighters pose for the official opening ceremony of the Karaj Women's Fire Station in 2006

The first all-women fire station in Iran and the Middle East, Station 117 of the Karaj Fire Department, was established in the city of Karaj, Alborz Province in 2003; the brigade specifically responds to calls for assistance from women as well as general fire and rescue callouts alongside male brigades. A female brigade has also been established in Shiraz, Fars Province.

=== Japan ===
As of 2024, Japanese women make up 3.7% of career firefighters and 3.8% of volunteer firefighters, and they face extra challenges and restrictions that male firefighters do not.

In 2015, 288 of the nation's fire departments (roughly 40%) did not employ any female firefighters; when questioned, 19 of those departments reported that they had a policy of barring women from employment within the department at all (in contravention of national policy), whereas 59 said they had no female applicants, and 165 said they had received applications from women, but had not accepted any of them.

Legal restrictions on the employment of women in workplaces involving heavy lifting and exposure to toxic gases have been used by fire departments to bar women from serving on frontline pump, ladder, and rescue squads, despite advice from the Fire and Disaster Management Agency that these restrictions are largely mitigated by teamwork and the use of SCBA. Despite this, in 2015, 6% of career female firefighters surveyed worked in frontline firefighting companies, with a further 25% serving in EMS roles, and 2.4% in mobile command roles, with the remainder working across office-based roles such as prevention, call-handling, and general administration.

The FDMA and Japanese government are looking to increase the proportion of female firefighters via reforms, mainly consisting of the development of alternative workstyles, improving maternity provisions, and upgrading equipment and facilities to accommodate female firefighters.

=== Netherlands ===
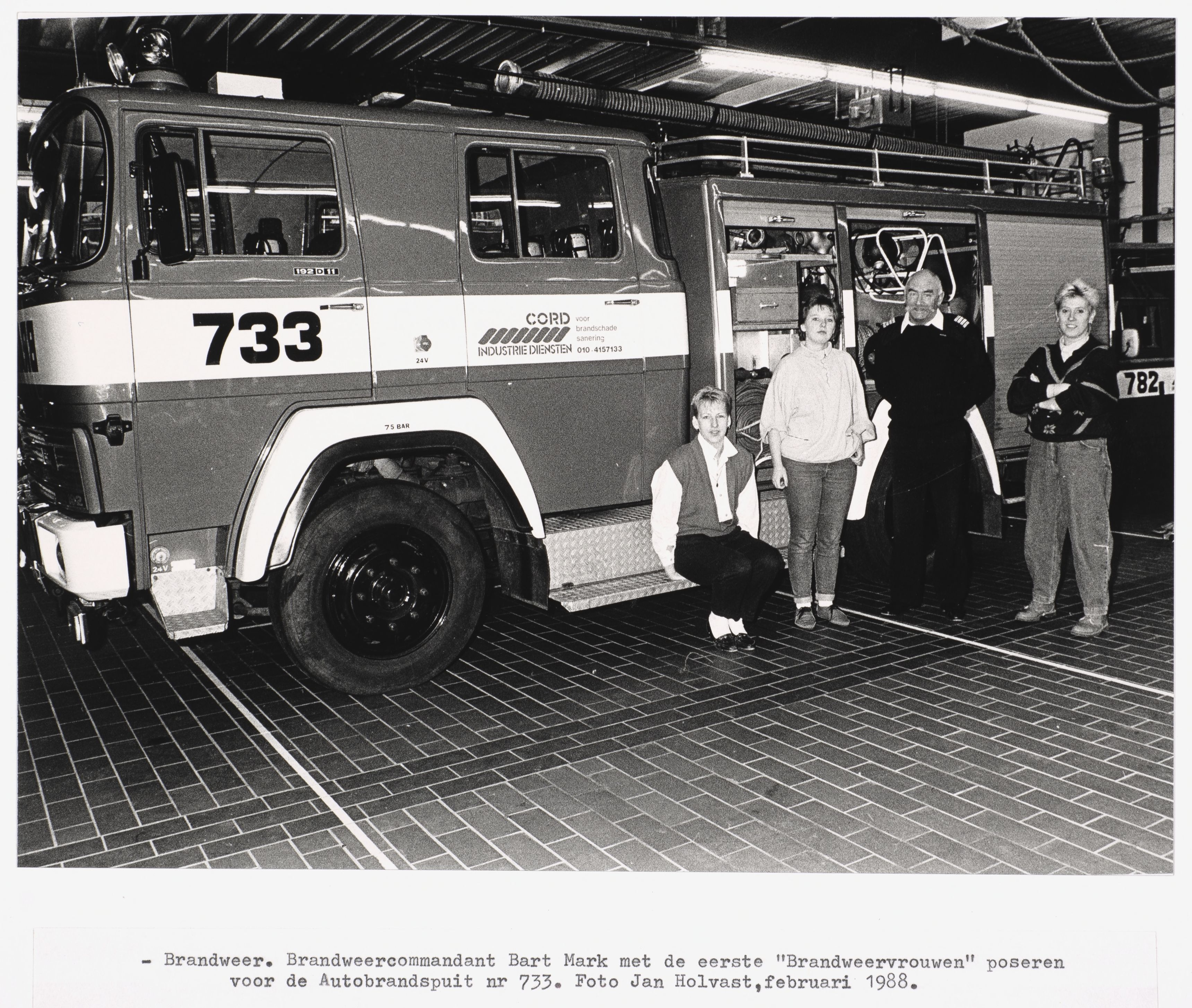
The first female firefighters of the Leiden fire department pose with their fire engine and station chief in 1988.

Women firefighters have been serving in the Netherlands since at least 1939.

In 2000, women accounted for 3.3% of professional firefighters.

=== New Zealand ===
==== Overview ====
New Zealand has a high proportion of female firefighters; in 2021, 6% of career firefighters and 20% of volunteer firefighters were female. The Women in Fire and Emergency New Zealand (WFENZ) represents women in the organisation and to national and international agencies. The organisation is also currently performing a study to identify areas to improve progression for female staff. However, in 2019, a report found that Fire & Emergency New Zealand, the national fire brigade, had a "bullying culture", and in particular had a high prevalence of misogynistic bullying.

==== Notable moments ====
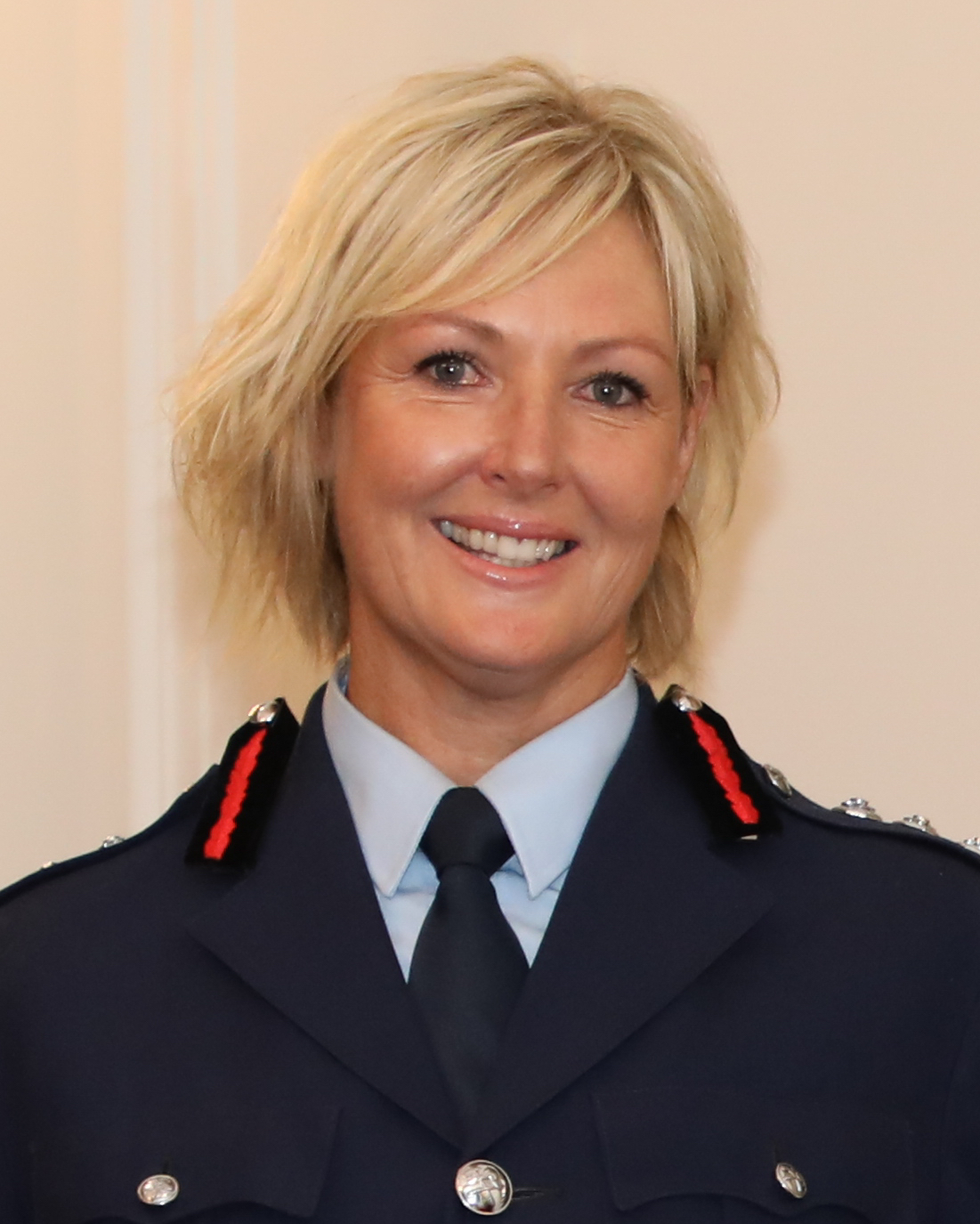
New Zealand firefighter Rachael Utumapu QSM, awarded in 2021 for services to firefighting and people with cancer.

There have many notable moments for female firefighters in New Zealand, including:

- 1940 – The Women's War Service Auxiliary and Women's Auxiliary Army Corps are formed; amongst other duties, they are trained in firefighting.
- 1943 – Dargaville Volunteer Fire Brigade forms New Zealand's first all-female brigade, formed of 11 WWSA members.
- 1964 – Nine women form the Ahipara Fire Party, the first post-war all-female brigade.
- 1968 – Five women join the Brunner Volunteer Fire Brigade as operational crew; this is the first known instance of a mixed gender fire brigade. The United Fire Brigades' Association refused to recognise the women's service.
- 1972 – Brunner VFB table a motion at the national UFBA conference to recognise female firefighters. The association responds that it was "considered inappropriate that women should be fulfilling the traditional fireman's role".
- 1979 – A modified motion to allow women to be recognised as firefighters from Brunner VFB is accepted by the UFBA, recognising the many women who were working as volunteer firefighters by this point.
- 1979 – Fire communications centre worker Anne Barry applies to join the New Zealand Fire Service as a career firefighter and is rejected on the grounds of gender.
- 1979 – A number of women compete for the first time in New Zealand at a provincial UFBA Waterways Competition in Tokomaru Bay, East Coast.
- 1981 – Sapper Jan Graham of the Royal New Zealand Engineers becomes the New Zealand Army's first full time female firefighter.
- 1981 – Anne Barry wins her 2yr battle with the NZ Fire Service Commission and was allowed to apply to join the NZFS as a career fire fighter.
- 1981 – Elizabeth England and Anne Barry complete the NZFS recruit course, with overall placings of 2nd and 3rd respectively, becoming New Zealand's first female career firefighters, and the first female career firefighters in Australasia.
- 1985 – Julie Croswell is appointed as the third female career firefighter in the NZFS.
- 1988 – Nella Booth and Sheralee Rickaby are appointed as the fourth equal female firefighters. Booth was appointed to Petone Station, Wellington Fire Region and Rickaby was appointed to Upper Hutt, Wellington Fire Region, of the NZFS.
- 1989 – Christine Hewson becomes the NZFS' first volunteer Station Officer of the Lake Hāwea Volunteer Fire Brigade.
- 1993 – Christine Hewson becomes the NZFS' first female Chief Fire Officer when she was appointed as Chief of the Lake Hāwea Volunteer Fire Brigade. Christine had served in the Brigade since May 1979.
- 1995 - Nicky Lafferty joints the NZFS career staff at Silverdale Fire Station, Auckland.
- 1998 – Nella Booth is appointed as the first career firefighter Station Officer in the NZFS at the Fire Safety section of Auckland Central Fire Station.
- 1999 – Allana Ranui is appointed as the first Māori female CFO in the NZFS for the Murupara Volunteer Fire Brigade.
- 1999 – Alison Timms is appointed acting Chief Executive of the NZFS, holding the position until 2001.
- 2001 – Melanie Horne becomes the first woman to win the Top Recruit award at the NZFS training centre.
- 2001 – Rosemary Higgins becomes New Zealand's first female 25yr Gold Star recipient. She joined the British Fire Service since 1959, and upon moving to New Zealand in 1975, she joined the Hamilton Fire Brigade in the Communications Centre. She was the only uniformed woman in Hamilton for nearly 17 years. When she retired from the Communication Centre, she joined the Pauanui Volunteer Fire Brigade.
- 2001 – Nella Booth convenes a group of career female firefighters in Auckland to discuss the possibility of setting up a support/network group. Many topics were discussed over the two days of the meeting, and one outcome was the formation of New Zealand Fire Service Women (NZFSW).
- 2005 – Stn. Officer Nella Booth, Senior FF Megan Tate and another female firefighter attend the first Women in Firefighting Conference in Sydney as representatives of New Zealand Fire Service Women (NZFSW).
- 2006 – Stn. Officer Nella Booth joins the Steering Committee of the Australasian Women in Firefighting Conference, Sydney and gave the closing address of the conference.
- 2008 – Rochelle Martin is appointed as the NZFS' first female career operational firefighter to hold the rank of Station Officer (?).
- 2014 – Maera Anderson, CFO of the Murupara brigade, is awarded the Pride of New Zealand (Emergency Services) award.
- 2015 – Rochelle Martine is appointed as the NZFS' first female career Senior Station Officer; six other women now hold career Station Officer rank.
- 2015 – New Zealand Fire Service Women (NZFSW) is reformed as Women in Fire and Emergency New Zealand (WFENZ).
- 2021 - Racheal Utumapu receives the Queen's Service Medal for services to firefighting and people with cancer; she was a founding member of the WFENZ National Women's Advisory Committee alongside several other roles supporting female firefighters.

=== Pakistan ===
Shazia Parveen, who hails from Vehari District in Punjab, joined the Rescue 1122 emergency services as a firefighter in 2010. This made her the first female firefighter in Pakistan.

=== Saudi Arabia ===
In 2018, two Saudi women became the first certified female firefighters in Saudi Arabia meeting the [Saudi] National Fire Protection Association's Professional Qualifications Standards.

=== United Kingdom ===
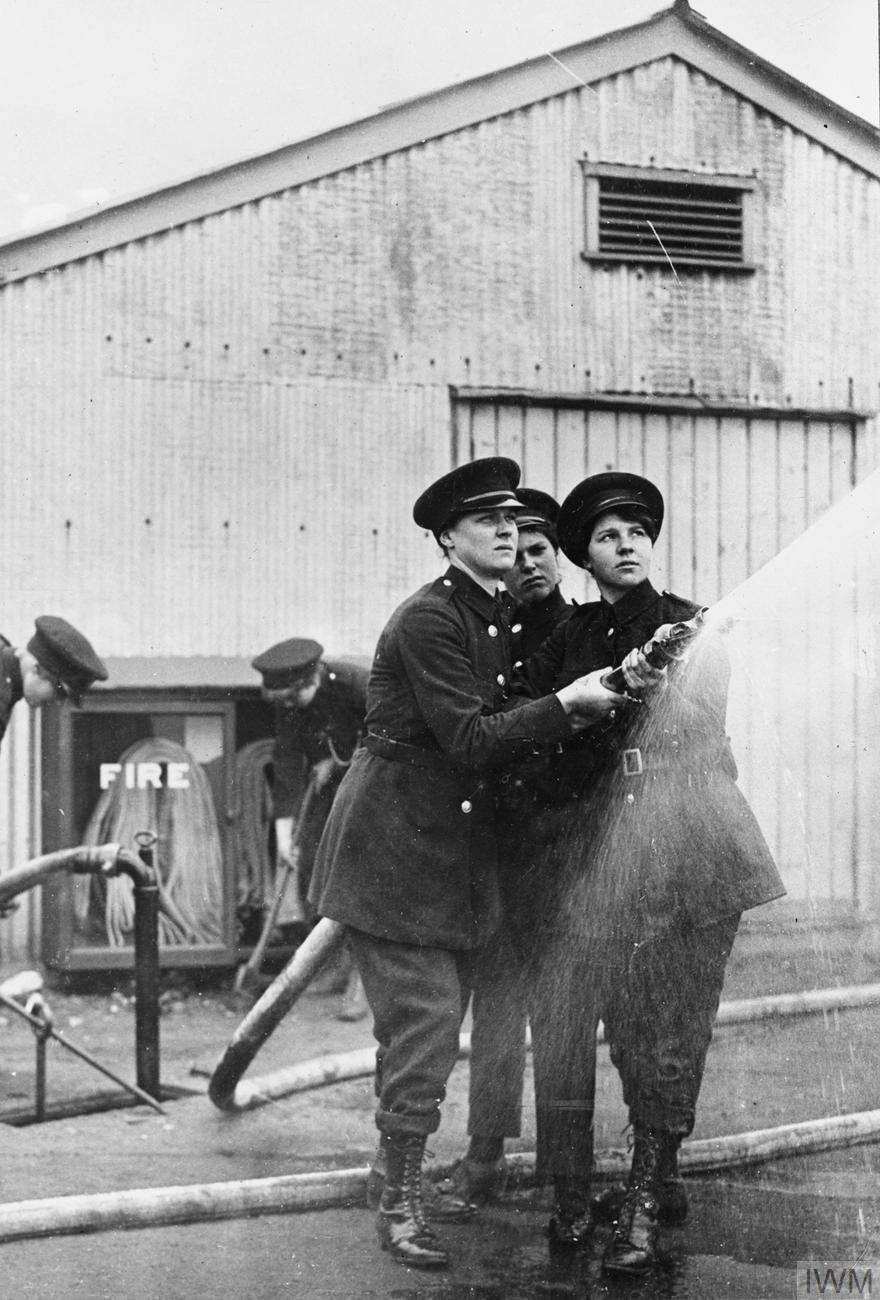
Firefighters responding to a call at a munitions factory in the United Kingdom during World War I

In Great Britain, Girton Ladies' College had an all-women's fire brigade from 1878 until 1932. In 1887 it was reported that women employed in a cigar factory in Liverpool had been formed into a fire brigade, and had effectively extinguished a fire at the factory. During World War I, women's brigades carried out firefighting and rescue in the South of England. During the 1920s, women firefighting teams were employed by private fire brigades. At the beginning of World War II, 5000 women were recruited for the Auxiliary Fire Service, rising to 7,000 women in what was then the National Fire Service. Though trained in firefighting, women were not there for that purpose, but rather for such positions as driving and firewatching. Many received awards for heroism.

In the modern era, some of the first women to participate in firefighting were based at Gordonstoun School near Elgin in Scotland. The school's staff and pupils had participated in a volunteer unit of the local Grampian Region Fire Brigade (GRFB) since the school's return from Wales in 1948. In 1972, the school accepted girls as pupils for the first time and from 1975 women were accepted into the voluntary firefighting unit. They were not initially allowed to be official members of the GRFB, but could operate only within the school. The turning point took place in 1976, when the scale of a forest fire on Ben Aigan near Craigellachie on Speyside led the GRFB to seek volunteers from the local community to help fight the fire. Alongside personnel from local Royal Air Force bases, a group of trained women firefighters from Gordonstoun attended. The performance and endurance of this group over seven days and nights of firefighting led the GRFB to agree to allow women to take on official front-line firefighting roles for the first time. The drought of the same year led to a call for extra firefighters and prompted other brigades to allow women to join. Mary Joy Langdon joined the East Sussex Fire Brigade on August 21 as a retained firefighter and was described by the press as Britain's first female firefighter. She was the first woman to be an operational firefighter in Britain.

In 1978, it was announced that women would be accepted into the fire service. Josephine Reynolds became the country's first female fulltime firefighter when she joined Norfolk Fire and Rescue Service in the early 1980s, after a year of training.

In 1996, Fleur Lombard became the first female firefighter to die in peacetime service in Britain.

In 2002, the Equal Opportunities Commission submitted a seven-page submission to the Independent Review of the Fire Service criticizing numerous practices which contributed to the extremely low recruitment of women and racial minorities in the fire service. In particular, the Commission highlighted the system of long day and night shifts, which likely discouraged women with children from applying, and the practice of only allowing those with firefighting experience to move into the higher ranks, which meant that control staff were ineligible.

In 2004, Dany Cotton became the first woman to be awarded the Queen's Fire Service Medal.

In 2011, Ann Millington became the first female chief fire officer, taking charge of the Kent Fire and Rescue Service. In 2016, Rebecca Bryant was appointed to lead the Staffordshire Fire and Rescue Service; she was the first female CFO to be a former frontline firefighter, while Station Manager Sally Harper received the Queen's Fire Service Medal. In 2017, Dany Cotton became Commissioner of the London Fire Brigade.

In 2017, 5.2% of operational firefighters in the UK were women, an increase from 3.1% in 2007. There were 300 female firefighters in the London Fire Brigade, amounting to 7% of the total.

=== United States ===
The first known female firefighter in the United States was in the early 1800s. She was an African American slave from New York, named Molly Williams, who was said to be "as good a fire laddie as many of the boys." In the 1820s, Marina Betts was a volunteer firefighter in Pittsburgh. Then, in 1863, Lillie Hitchcock was made an honorary member of the Knickerbocker Engine Company, No. 5., in San Francisco in 1863.

The first paid fire company was in Cincinnati, Ohio in 1853, and was all men. Women remained volunteer for years after. In the 1910s, there were women's volunteer fire companies in Silver Spring, Maryland, and Los Angeles, California.

During World War I, many women entered the workforce to replace the men who were fighting overseas. This resulted in thousands of women working in traditionally male-dominated professions, for example, the military hired approximately 11,000 women by 1918 for clerical work.

In 1936 Emma Vernell became the first official female firefighter in New Jersey, after her husband died in the line of duty.

During World War II, some women served as firefighters in the United States to replace male firefighters who joined the military; and during part of the war, two fire departments in Illinois were all-female. In 1942, the first all-female forest firefighting crew in California was created.

In the 1960s, there were all-female fire companies in Kings County, California, and Woodbine, Texas. During the summer of 1971, an all-female Bureau of Land Management (BLM) firefighting crew fought fires in the wilds of Alaska. Furthermore, an all-female United States Forest Service firefighting crew fought fires in 1971 and 1972 in Montana.

Over 100 years after the first paid male firefighter, Sandra Forcier became the first known paid female firefighter (excluding forest firefighting) in the United States, and began working in North Carolina in 1973 for Winston-Salem Fire Department. Forcier was a Public Safety Officer, a combination of police officer and firefighter. The first woman to work solely as a paid firefighter (excluding forest firefighting) was Judith Livers, hired by the Arlington County, Virginia fire department in 1974.

Brenda Berkman took legal action against a discriminating physical test of the New York City Fire Department in 1982. After winning the case, she and about 40 other women became the first female firefighters in the history of New York City. Berkman was also the founder of the United Women Firefighters and the first openly gay professional firefighter in America.

Chief Rosemary Bliss was the first female head of a career fire department in Tiburon, California. She became fire chief in 1993.

In 2002, approximately 2% of all firefighters were female in the United States.

In 2005, Sarinya Srisakul was the first Asian-American woman to be hired by the New York City Fire Department.

In 2013, Los Angeles Mayor Eric Garcetti vowed to make sure that 5% of the Los Angeles Fire Department's firefighters were women by 2020. As of 2018 3.1% of the department's firefighters were women. In 2022, Kristin Crowley became the first female, and the first openly gay, chief of the Los Angeles Fire Department.

In 2015, the New York City Fire Department had 58 women, representing less than 0.5% of the 10,000 active operational firefighters. That same year, Regina Wilson became the first woman president of the Vulcan Society (an African-American firefighting association). In 2022, Laura Kavanagh became the first female commissioner of the New York City Fire Department.

As of 2016, 7% of firefighters in the United States were women.

=== South Korea ===
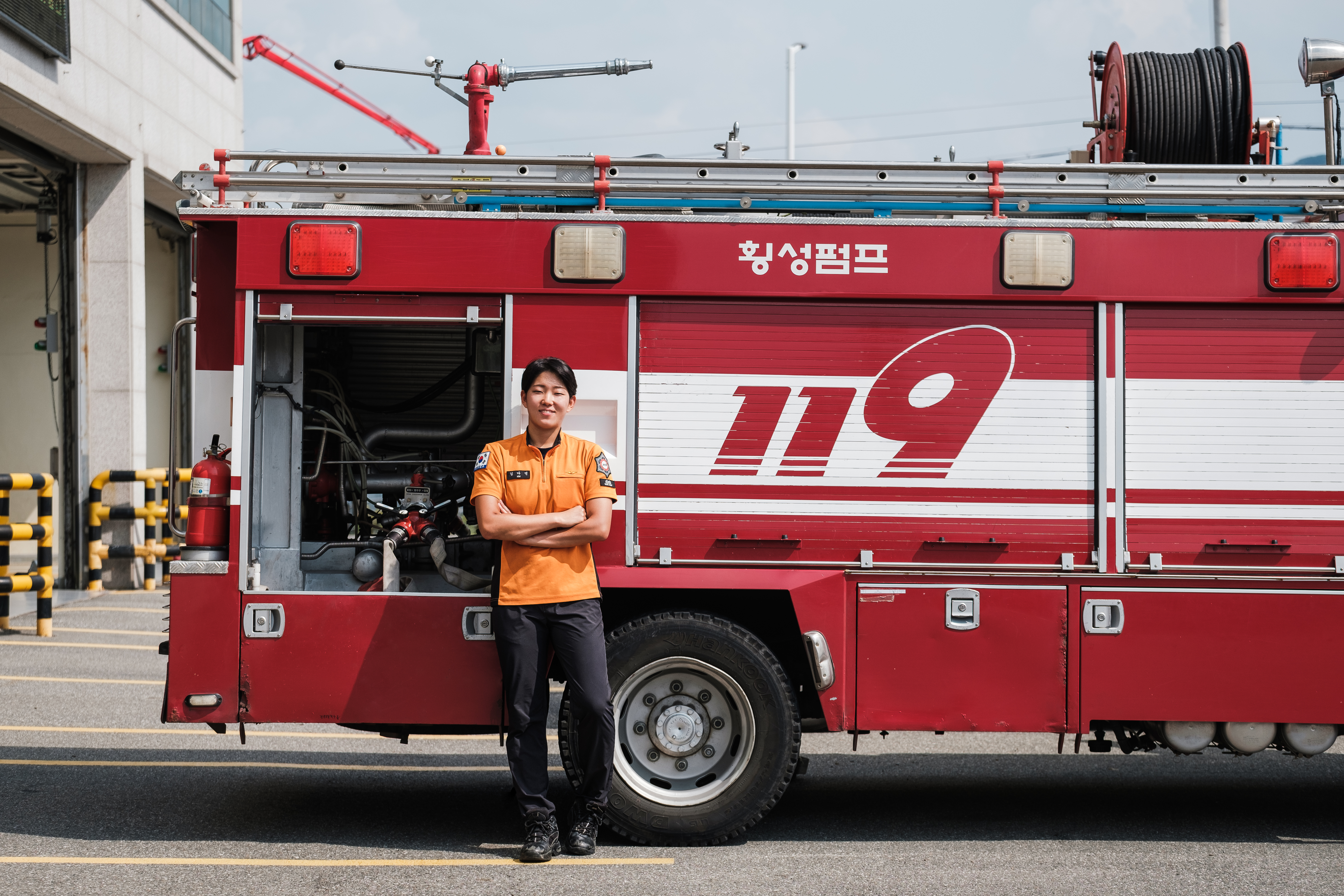
Kim Da-yeon, the first female firefighter in South Korea to participate in The Strongest Firefighter Games

In 2019, Jung Moon-ho, the commissioner of National Fire Agency, said, "We will increase the proportion of women by 10% of the prefecture as there are many demands for recruiting firefighters regardless of gender". As of the end of October 2018, the number of firefighters in South Korea was 48,146. Of these, 3,610 women (7.5 percent) were women.

=== Turkey ===
The first known female firefighter in the Ottoman Empire was Tulumbacı Bahriye. She worked voluntarily in the fire brigade (Tulumbacılar) from 1884 until 1892.

In modern times, Sabiha Yalçın became the first female firefighter in Turkey in İzmit in 1988.

In 1999, the İzmir Fire Department hired the first woman firefighter of that city, Devrim Özdemir. By the year 2007, the number of the city's firefighters who were female was six.

In 2013, the Gaziantep Fire Department hired the first woman firefighter of that city, Fatma Doğan.

In 2021, 37 women joined the Istanbul Fire Department as the first women firefighters of the city.

== Additional notable female firefighters ==
- Lillie Hitchcock Coit – American. Volunteer firefighter in San Francisco, in the 1920s and beyond.
- Dany Cotton – British. First woman to win the Queen's Fire Service Medal, highest ranking operational female firefighter in the country.
- Molly Williams – American. First known female firefighter in the United States.

== See also ==
- Women in the military
- Women in law enforcement
