= Firefighting in the United States =

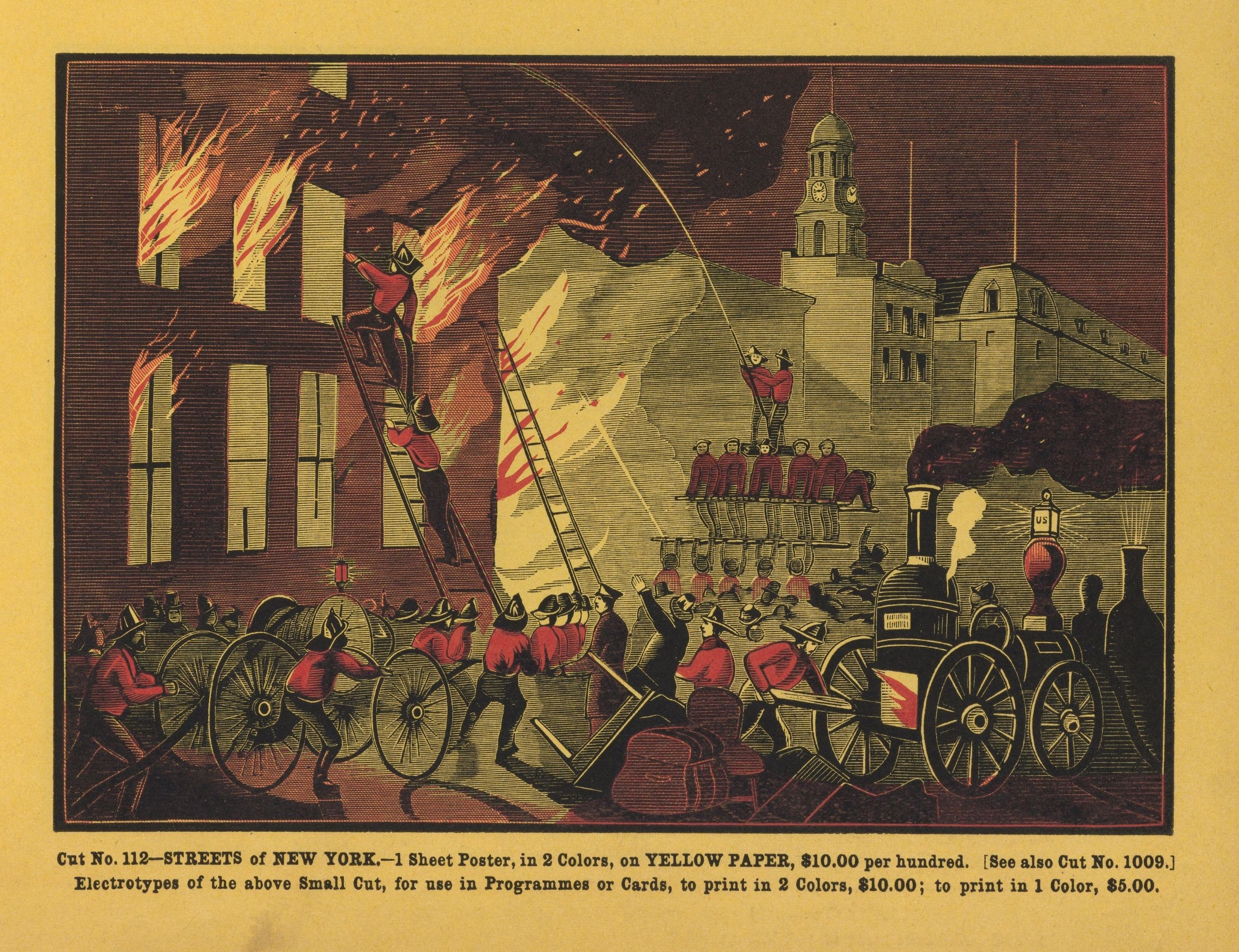
Streets of New York (1869)

Firefighting in the United States dates back to the earliest European colonies in the Americas. Early firefighters were simply community members who would respond to neighborhood fires with buckets. The first dedicated volunteer fire brigade was established in 1736 in Philadelphia. Insurance companies often paid these volunteer companies in return for protecting their clients.

As cities grew, this method became unreliable, and the first professional fire department was established in Cincinnati in 1853. By the 20th century, fire departments were forced to adapt to modern hazards, such as high-rise and hazardous-material fires. They also began to expand their services to include other, non-fire, public safety needs including vehicle rescue and EMS service. As of 2018, 62% of fire departments offered some form of emergency medical response.

Firefighters in the United States today are organized along paramilitary lines, utilizing modern equipment, and are most often grouped into city or county departments. In 2025, professional fire departments protect 68% of the US population, with a total of 1,216,600 firefighters serving in 27,228 fire departments nationwide and responding to emergencies from 58,150 fire stations. Union firefighters are represented by the International Association of Fire Fighters (IAFF). The New York City Fire Department is the largest in the United States.

== Overview ==
A fire department responds to a fire every 23 seconds throughout the United States. Fire departments responded to 26,959,000 calls for service in 2020. Of these, 64.2% were for medical help, 8% were false alarms, and 3.9% were for actual fires.

Since at least 1980, calls for fires have decreased both as a proportion of total calls and in absolute numbers, from 3,000,000 to 1,400,000 in 2011, while medical calls have increased from 5,000,000 to 19,800,000 in the same period. While some medical calls are dealt with only by ambulances, it is common for fire engines to respond to them as well.

The professionalization of American firefighting was largely a result of four factors: steam fire engines, fire insurance companies that demanded the municipalization of firefighting, and the theory that suggested that payment of wages would naturally result in improved service. Paid firefighters may be union or non-union. Union American firefighters are represented and united in the International Association of Fire Fighters with headquarters in Washington, D.C. However, many municipalities still rely on volunteer, paid on call, or part-time firefighters. These non-full-time firefighters are rarely unionized, and their interests are represented by the National Volunteer Fire Council.

The United States Fire Administration provides national leadership to local fire services. Fire departments report fires and other incidents according to the National Fire Incident Reporting System, which maintains records of these incidents in a uniform manner. The National Fire Protection Association sets and maintains minimum standards and requirements for firefighting duties and equipment. The suppression of wildfires is regulated by the United States Department of Agriculture, US Forest Service, Bureau of Land Management, and the Bureau of Indian Affairs. This is done through the National Wildland Coordination Center.

The two million fire calls that American fire departments respond to each year represent the highest figures in the industrialized world. On average every year between 2008 and 2017, 3,190 civilians died, 16,225 were injured, and property damage reached $14.7 billion. Indirect costs, such as temporary lodging expenses, lost time at work, medical expenses, and psychological damages are equally high (the United States Fire Administration 1996). According to statistics from the American Red Cross, the annual losses from floods, hurricanes, tornadoes, earthquakes, and other natural disasters combined in the United States average just a fraction of those from fires. House fires, in particular, are one of the most common tragedies facing emergency disaster workers in recent history. According to the US Fire Administration, the United States has a more severe fire problem than is generally perceived. In inner-city Pennsylvania neighborhoods, house fires have increased significantly, especially in socially and economically disadvantaged areas. A trend in these house fires is that 60% of the houses lack working smoke detectors. Additionally, these households are prone to using supplemental heating devices and substandard extension cords that are not Underwriters Laboratories (UL) compliant. UL-compliant extension cords are labeled with information on their use, size, and rating.

== History ==
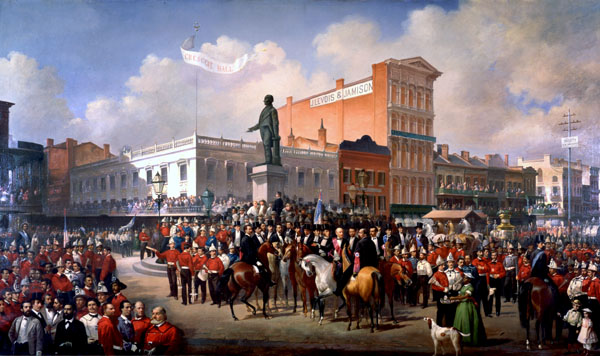
Volunteer Firemen's Parade, March 4th 1872 in New Orleans around the statue of Henry Clay. Painting by Victor Pierson and Paul E. Poincy.

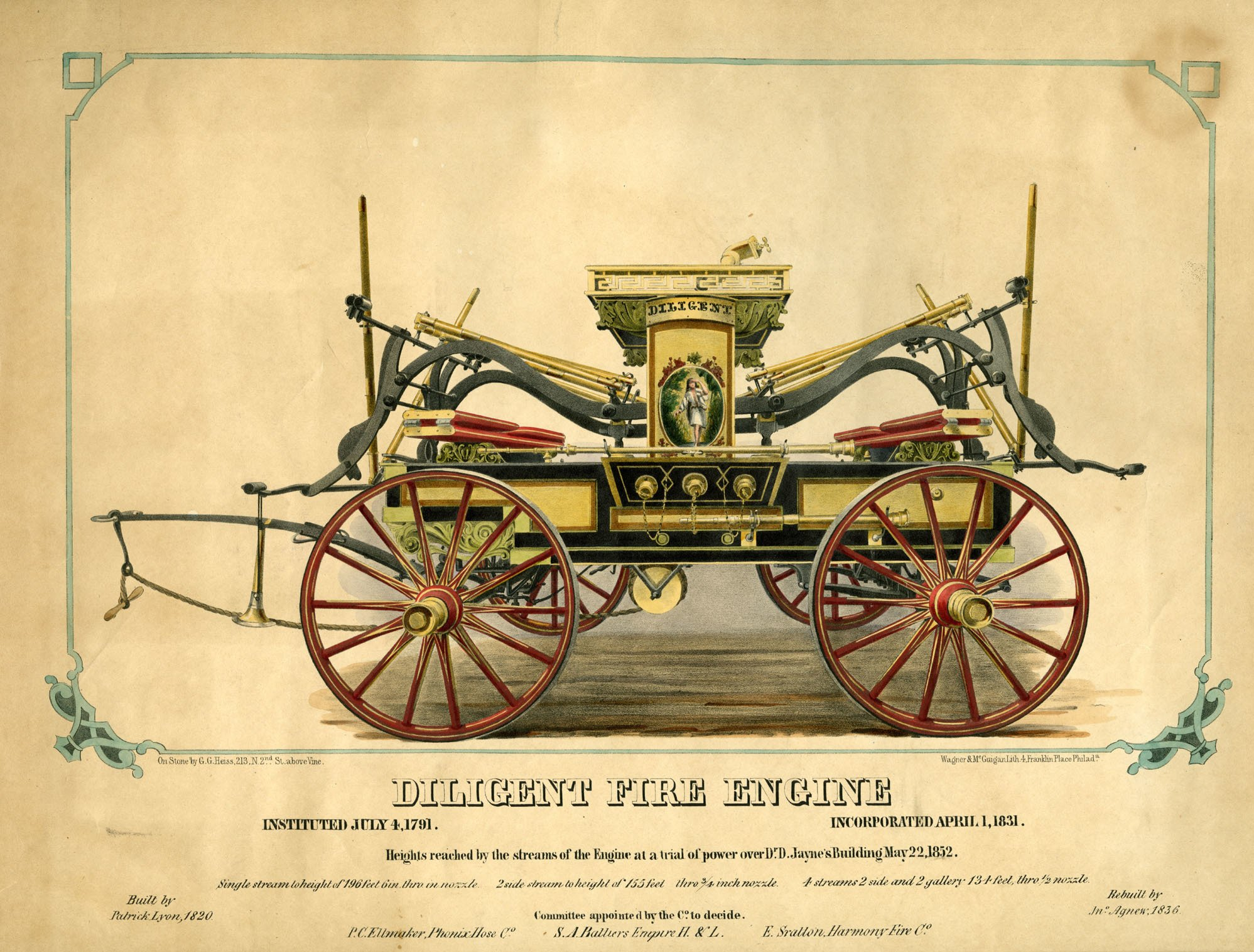
Diligent Fire Engine (1820), built by Patrick Lyon, Philadelphia.

Firefighting in the United States can be traced back to the 17th century when, after a great conflagration in Boston in 1631, the Massachusetts Bay Colony passed a law banning smoking in public places.

New Amsterdam established the colonies' first firefighting system in 1647. Fire wardens inspected the houses and chimneys, fining for potential hazards. An eight-man team called a Rattle-Watch patrolled the streets at night. When a fire was detected, they shook wooden rattles to alert townspeople. In 1711, the concerned Americans formed the so-called mutual fire societies, each with approximately 20 members. When a member of the society was struck by fire, other members rushed to assist. The first water-pumping engines were imported to New York in the 1730s.

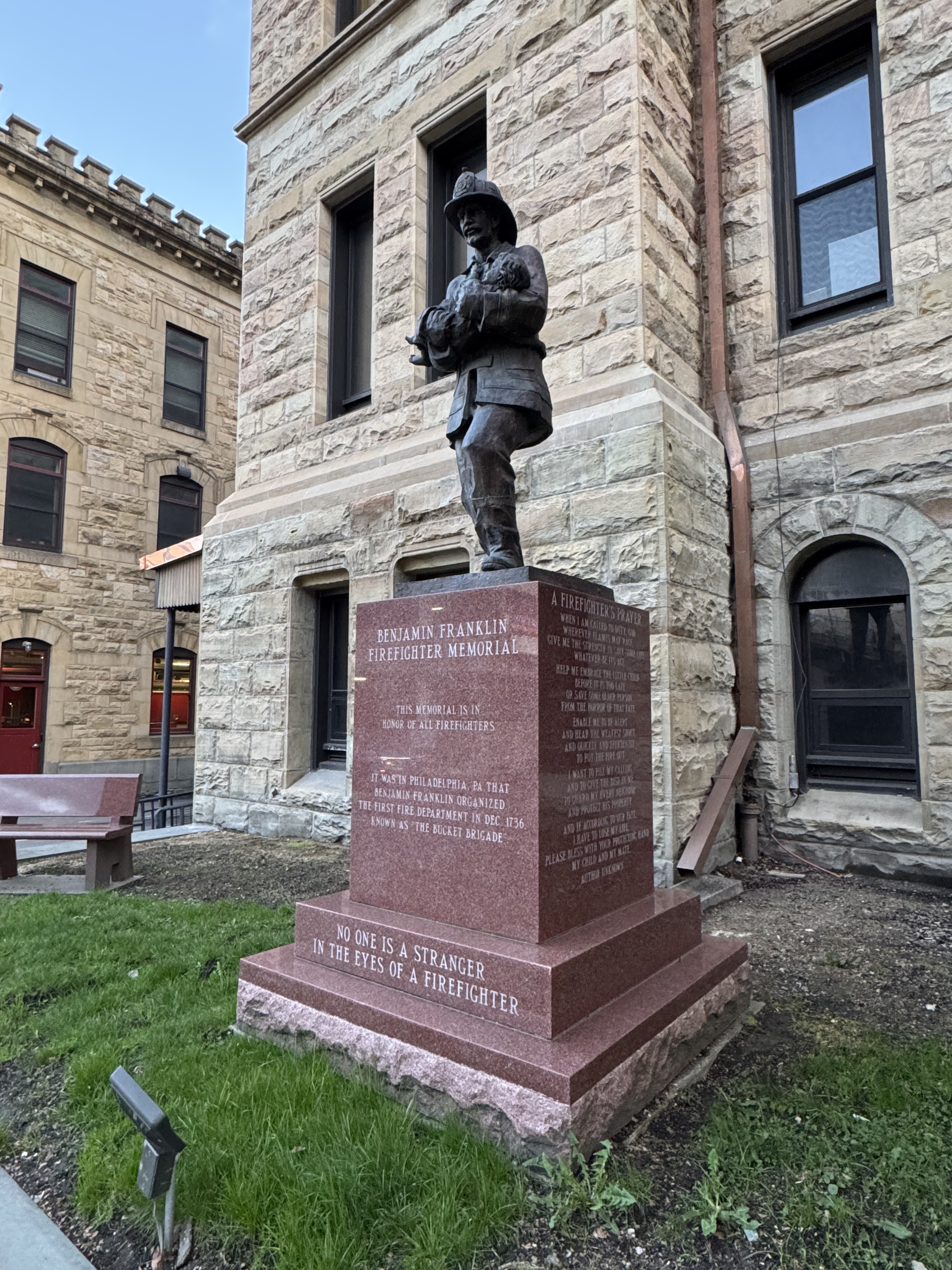
The Benjamin Franklin Firefighter Memorial in Scranton, Pennsylvania. Benjamin Franklin founded the first American volunteer fire company in Philadelphia in 1736.

=== Fire companies ===
Benjamin Franklin founded the first American volunteer fire company in Philadelphia in 1736. Such companies were soon organized in other colonies. Among those who served as volunteer firefighters were George Washington, Alexander Hamilton, John Hancock, Samuel Adams and Paul Revere. In 1818 the first known female firefighter Molly Williams rose to prominence in New York, when she took her place with the men on the drag ropes and pulled the pumper to the fire through the deep snow. Volunteer firefighters were honored with frequent stanzas in urban newspapers and made the subject of heroizing prints by the popular American printmaking firm Currier & Ives. Nathaniel Currier, of Currier & Ives, served as a volunteer firefighter in New York City during the 1850s.

In the early days of the fire service, fire companies were, more or less, social organizations. Being an accepted member meant a certain social status in the community. Remnants of that social status can still be found today in the traditional firefighter's parade helmets that resemble top hats worn by the early firefighters. Money that was used to help fund the organization was obtained by insurance company payouts from fighting fires. Firefighters could easily tell which homeowners had fire insurance and which didn't by fire insurance marks on the front of the home. Often, it was a problem for homeowners without insurance to have the fire company respond to a fire in their home and effectively remove belongings and such, because the firefighters knew there wouldn't be any money in it for them.

The first fire companies in Washington D.C. – the Union Fire Company, the Columbia Fire Company, and the Anacostia Fire Company – were organized in 1804 to serve the White House, the Capitol, and the neighborhood of Anacostia, respectively. By the 1840s and 1850s, the differences between companies within the same city had become quite significant.

With few exceptions, like in Savannah, Georgia, firefighters denied African Americans the opportunity to join the companies or form their own ones. As early as 1818 in Philadelphia, the local free black community attempted to form the African Fire Association. Meanwhile, some southern cities, such as Charleston and Savannah, relied on African American labor.

=== Fire apparatus ===
American firefighters designed, built, or specified their equipment. In particular, they dedicated themselves to the engines and viewed them as integral to the fire company's identity.

Blacksmith Patrick Lyon of Philadelphia was an innovator in the construction of firefighting apparatus. In 1800, he patented a hand-pumped engine that was the most powerful in the United States, and he built the first hose wagon in 1804, which eliminated the need for bucket brigades in cities. Lyon's masterpiece was the hand-pumper Diligent, which, at 32-years-old, outperformed the new Cincinnati-built steam pumper Young America in a famous 1852 contest.

In 1853, the first practical, steam-powered, fire engine was tested in Cincinnati (OH). It was created by Abel Shawk, Alexander Bonner Latta, and Miles Greenwood. The engine was then named Uncle Joe Ross after a city council member.

=== Fire departments ===
Before the 1850s, there were only volunteer fire companies. In 1853, Cincinnati, Ohio, became the first city with a fully paid fire department, followed 11 months later by the Providence Fire Department in Providence, Rhode Island. In 1855, the Metropolitan Hook and Ladder Company Number 1 Firehouse, Washington's oldest extant firehouse, was built at Massachusetts Avenue. Then, in 1859, came the fully paid Fire Force in Indianapolis (IFD), under the guidance and authority of Mayor Samuel D. Maxwell, going so far as to ban the volunteer departments from the city. As a proud Norse Celt, he vowed that "Indianapolis will only accept aggressive, paid firemen possessing the bravery and strength of a Highland Warrior and the dedication to battle like the Viking". Many volunteer companies disbanded around America's larger cities; however, volunteer fire departments still protected property and played an important role, as they do even today. Later, the specialized life-saving units in American fire departments - the pompier corps - were formed.

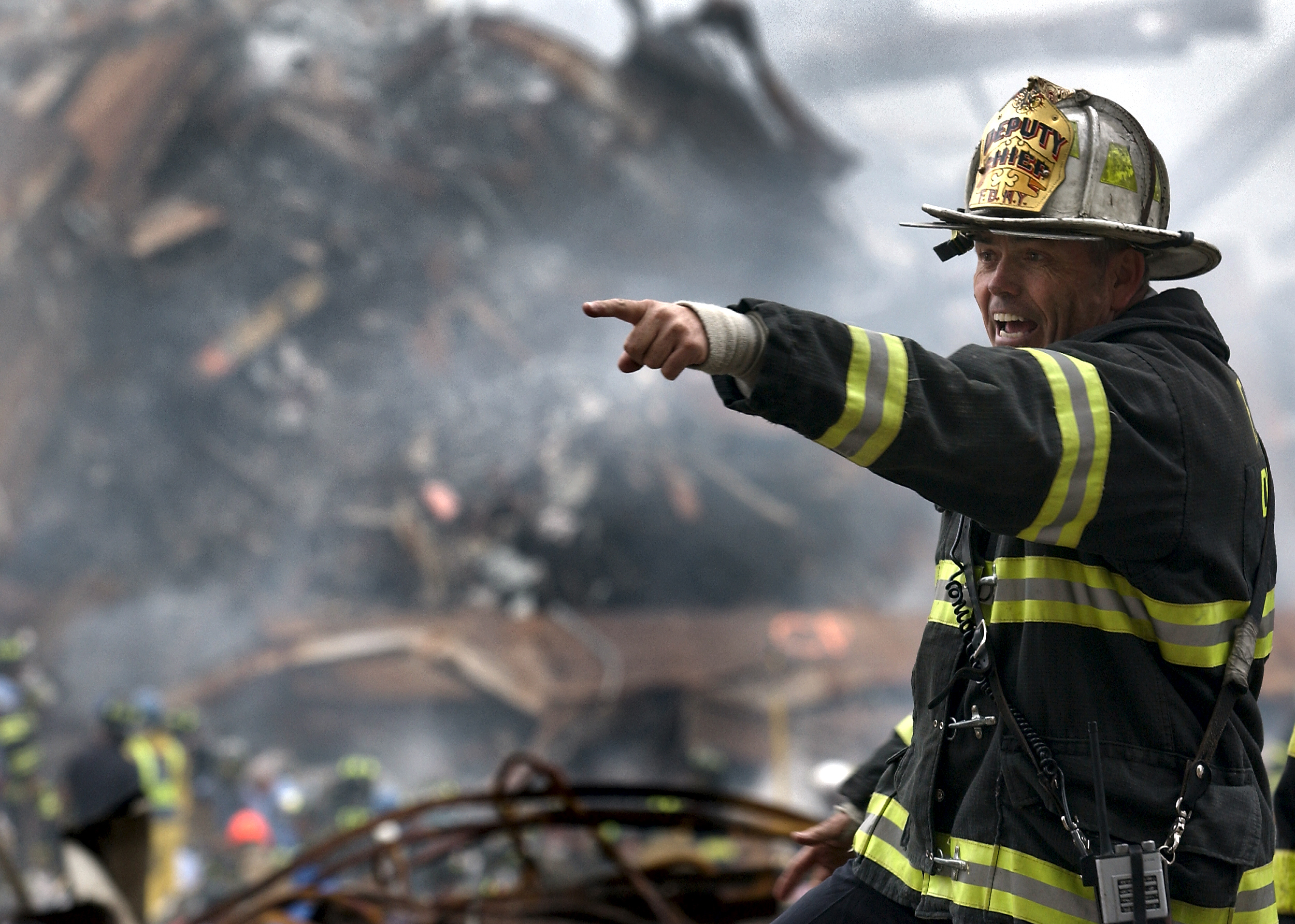
FDNY Deputy Chief Joseph Curry at the World Trade Center site of 2001 September 11 attacks.

In the 20th century, the nature of an American firefighter's job began to change. Structural firefighting was still the main purpose of the department, but more specialized training and education, such as for high-rise structure fires, confined space environments, and building construction education, were included and emphasized. Other disciplines were taken on as responsibilities in lifesaving. An example of such is the practice of Paramedicine, which debuted in the late 1960s and early 1970s. Presently, almost all fire departments across the United States are trained in and perform technical rescue, vehicle rescue, high-angle rescue, wildland firefighting, and hazardous materials response. Additionally, almost all career departments, as well as many volunteer departments, have emergency medical assets readily available.

Several notable events have resulted in the deaths of many firefighters. Japanese planes attacked Honolulu Fire Department (HFD) personnel responding to the December 7, 1941, attack on Pearl Harbor, killing three. 343 New York City Fire Department (FDNY) firefighters were killed when the World Trade Center towers collapsed during the attacks of September 11, 2001. In 2007, the Sofa Super Store fire in Charleston, South Carolina, killed nine members of the City of Charleston Fire Department.

In 2011, there were about 1.1 million firefighters in the country. 31% were paid, and the remainder volunteered. The nation has seen an increase in paid positions; an 8.6% decrease in volunteers from 2008 to 2011. As of 2018, this decline continued, with 33% or 370,000 being career firefighters and 67% or 745,000 being volunteers.

== Company and unit types ==
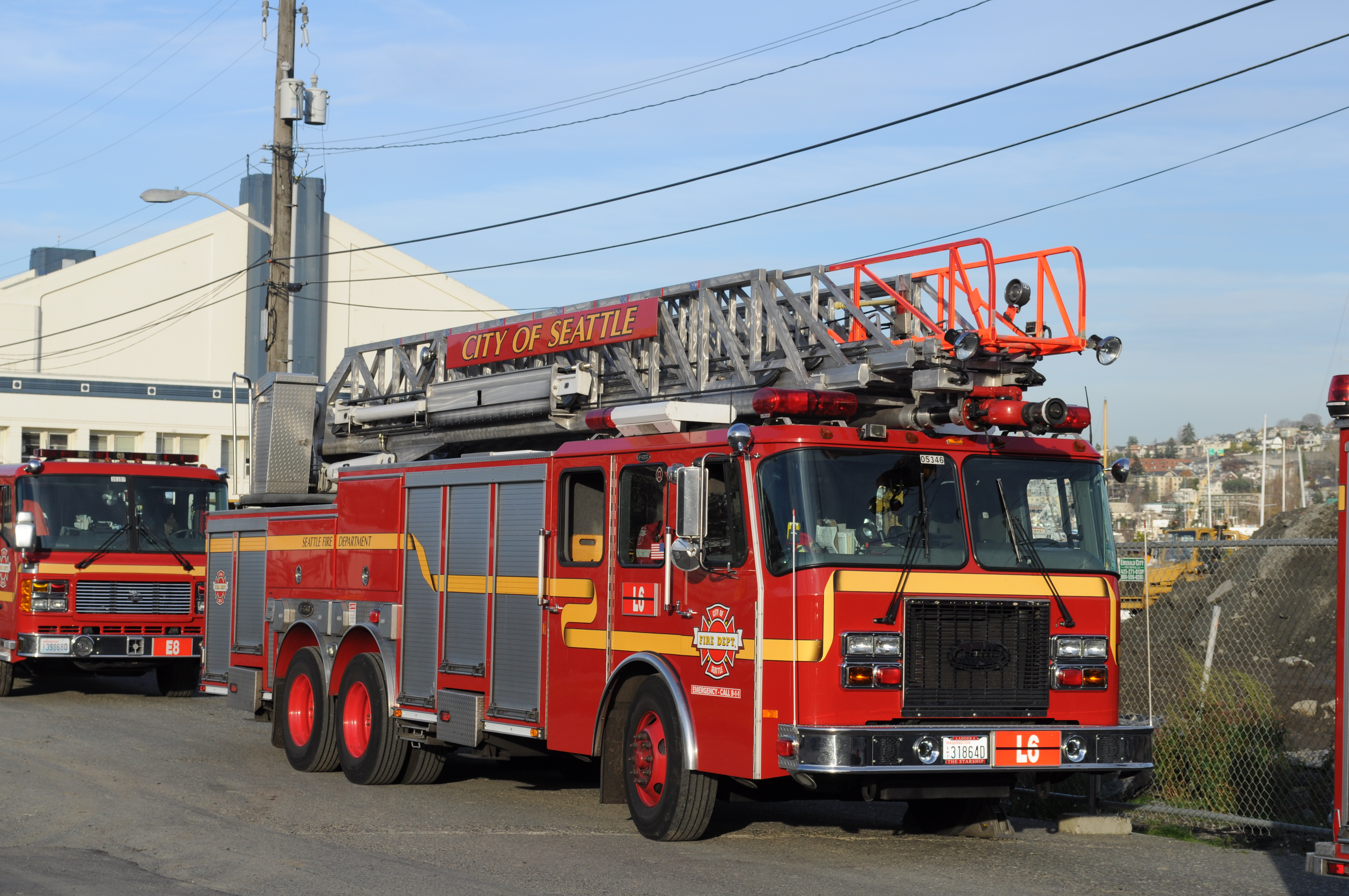
Fire trucks in Seattle

Fire companies and units come in several types. Note that the names below are not standard and have numerous local variations. Examples of these units are described below.

=== Engine companies or pumper companies ===
Engine companies, or pumper companies, operate units that deliver water to a fire and perform other duties on various emergency calls. Modern engine companies or pumper companies almost always operate "triple-combination" units that include a pump, a water tank, and hoses. This company has the primary responsibility for supplying water to a fire scene, locating and confining the fire, and extinguishing it. Some engine companies or pumper companies are equipped for some levels of medical first response. Engine Companies or Pumper Companies have a varied number of personnel on board, but there is usually a Driver or Engineer, an officer (Either a Lieutenant or Captain), and either two, three, or more firefighters.

=== Truck companies or ladder companies ===
Truck companies or ladder companies operate units that carry ladders, aerial devices, and other equipment to access buildings above ground level and to assist in other emergencies. Some truck companies or ladder companies have been designated "quint trucks". Primarily, the truck company or ladder company performs the ladder work and supplies master streams to the fireground. The truck company or ladder company also performs structural ventilation and overhaul, primary and secondary search & rescue, securing of utilities, and often supplies rapid intervention teams. Some ladder trucks also have rescue tools and medical equipment on board. There are several types of ladder companies or truck companies in the United States fire service. This includes Hook and Ladder Companies, Tower Ladder Companies, and Aerial Tower Companies. Some aerial ladder trucks will also act as quint trucks if necessary. The number of personnel on Truck Companies or Ladder Companies depends on the response profile and department.

=== Heavy rescue companies ===
Heavy rescue companies operate units that carry a wide variety of tools and equipment to assist in the search and rescue of victims during incidents such as fires, traffic collisions, or other emergencies. It may or may not provide emergency medical response and may or may not transport patients to a hospital, depending on its response profile. The New York City Fire Department has five heavy rescue companies. The Chicago Fire Department has four rescue squads in service. Some departments, including the Albany (New York) Fire Department, the Philadelphia (Pennsylvania) Fire Department, and Baltimore City Fire Department, have only one heavy rescue company in service. A variety of specialized equipment and tools are found on a Heavy Rescue Company apparatus. This includes the Jaws Of Life Hydraulic Rescue Tool Systems (Spreaders, Cutters, Combi Tools, Rams, Etc), specialized power saws, air bags, specialized air, electric and battery-operated breaching, breaking, and cutting tools, specialized cutting torches, cribbing, rope rescue equipment, hazardous materials response equipment, emergency medical services equipment, and other types of specialized tools and equipment. Heavy Rescue Company Units have a varied number of personnel on board depending on their department and response profile.

=== Squad Company ===
This type of unit has many different local and regional definitions. In the New York City Fire Department and Baltimore City Fire Department, for example, a squad company is a hybrid company consisting of an apparatus equipped with supplies necessary to perform some levels of rescue operations, as well as tools and equipment necessary for engine company and truck company operations. In some areas, it is identical to a rescue unit or a medic company. A squad in the Los Angeles County Fire Department is a small truck that serves as the primary response vehicle for rescue and medical operations. It carries a small amount of firefighting, rescue, and medical equipment. A fictional squad example is Squad 51 from the TV show Emergency!. It was used by two paramedics in the Los Angeles County Fire Department to respond to a variety of emergencies, including medical calls, fires, and other incidents.

=== Medic units or ambulance units ===
Medic units/ambulance units are units that provide Emergency Medical Services (EMS), often at the Paramedic/Advanced Life Support or Emergency Medical Technician/Basic Life Support response level. Many fire services offer some form of medical response, and ambulance units or medic companies may or may not transport patients to hospitals. Cardiac monitors and defibrillators, cardiac drugs, oxygen equipment, intubation and airway management supplies, and other equipment are found on Ambulance Units and Medic Units.

=== Quint Companies ===
Quint is short for quintuple-combination engine. This unit has the three items that an engine has—pump, tank, hose—but also carries ground ladders, an aerial device, specialized equipment, and tools for certain situations.

=== Hazardous materials Companies ===
Hazardous materials companies operate specialized units that handle the mitigation of hazardous materials incidents. This truck may carry tools and equipment to respond to events such as train derailments, large-vehicle accidents, industrial accidents, CBRNE incidents, and other situations that may threaten the public. Non-sparking tools, generators, tarps, and other items are found on a Hazardous Materials Company apparatus.

=== Tanker units and tender trucks ===
Tanker units and tender trucks are vehicles with large water tanks. They may also have a pump.

=== Brush patrol unit ===
A brush patrol unit is typically built on a heavy-duty pickup chassis and equipped to fight brush fires. A brush unit typically responds with an engine to major fires, though the brush unit may also respond alone.

=== Helicopter or air ambulance apparatus ===
Depending on the department, a helicopter may be used as an air ambulance or as a suppression and fire-observation tool for brush fires. Some are even used for both, as in departments like the Los Angeles Fire Department. These units have specialized emergency medical services equipment or firefighting tools to assist in certain rescue incidents or at fire scenes.

=== Chief officer vehicle ===
Chief Officer Units operate vehicles that are staffed by Commanding Officers who hold Chief Officer Ranks including Battalion Chiefs, District Chiefs, Deputy Chiefs, Etc.These Officers are in charge of a multitude of Fire Companies/Units and Fire Stations in their respective areas.These vehicles are equipped to assist with command and control at fires or other incidents, and may also carry medical equipment to respond to EMS incidents.

=== EMS supervisor or EMS captain Vehicle ===
Similar to a chief vehicle, the EMS supervisor or EMS captain vehicle contains a chief officer or other officers for emergency medical services, which usually respond to large emergencies, and is usually tasked with directing medical resources on scene. These units have specialized equipment to help these members give instructions and provide command and control at certain scenes. These units are also designed to carry a wide assortment of Emergency Medical Services Supplies and provide medical assistance during certain emergencies.

== Specialized firefighting categories ==
- Structural firefighting - Structural Firefighting is usually conducted in urban or suburban areas.Structural firefighters engage with fires that take place in residential and commercial buildings.
- Highrise firefighting-This is a variant of structural firefighting.It deals with fires in high-rise buildings (defined as any building greater than 75 feet in height)
- Confined space firefighting-Confined Space firefighting is conducted in spaces not designed for regular occupancy. Confined space firefighting may involve limited mobility and maneuverability and may have a hazardous build-up of toxic gases.
- Wildland firefighting - Wildland firefighters tackle wildfires in the wilderness, particularly forests and prairies.
- Airport firefighting - Aircraft Rescue and Fire Fighting (ARFF) involves aviation accidents that require firefighting equipment and personnel. Usually found at or nearby airports.
- Hazardous materials (HAZMAT) firefighting - deals with incidents involving hazardous materials; chemical, biological, radiological, nuclear, and/or explosive.

== Organization ==
U.S. firefighters work under the auspices of fire departments (also commonly called fire protection districts, fire divisions, fire companies, fire bureaus, and fire-rescue companies, etc.). These departments are generally organized as local or county government subsidiaries, special-purpose district entities, or not-for-profit corporations. The parent government may fund them through millage, service fees, fundraising, or charitable contributions. Some state governments and the federal government operate fire departments to protect their wildlands, e.g., California Department of Forestry and Fire Protection (CAL FIRE), New Jersey Forest Fire Service, USDA Forest Service – Wildland Firefighting Workforce and Forest Service Aviation. Many military installations, major airports and large industrial facilities also operate their own fire departments.

A small number of U.S. fire departments are privatized, that is, operated by for-profit corporations on behalf of public entities. Knox County, Tennessee is among the largest public entities protected by privatized fire departments.

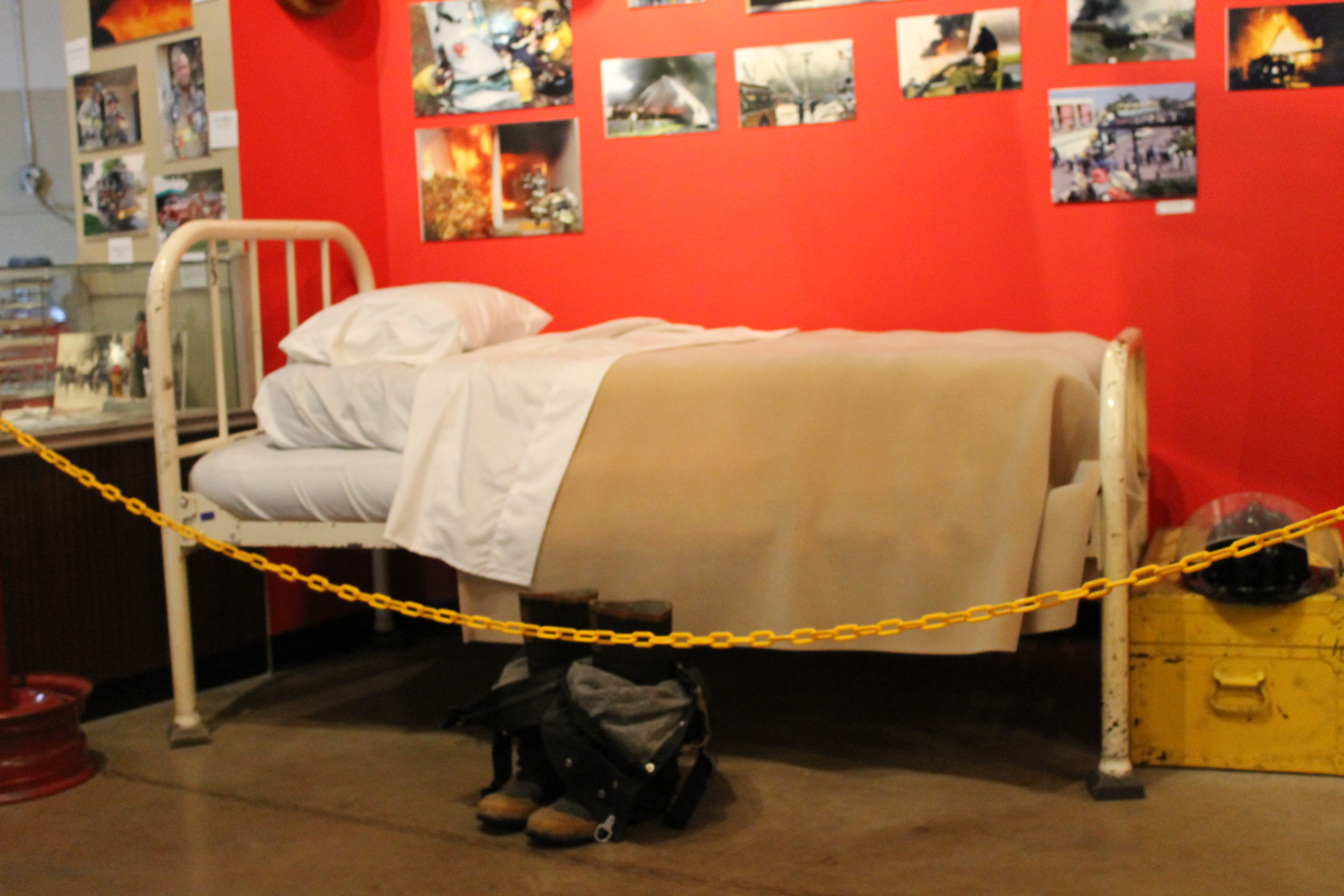
A firefighter's bunk with uniform ready to wear in the San Antonio Fire Museum in San Antonio, Texas

Most larger urban areas have career firefighters. Most rural areas have volunteer or paid on-call firefighters. Smaller towns and suburban areas may have either. 74% of career firefighters are in departments that protect 25,000 or more people. 95% of volunteer firefighters are in departments that protect fewer than 25,000 people, and more than half of these are in small, rural departments protecting fewer than 2,500 people. Departments range in size from a handful of firefighters to the New York City Fire Department, with over 11,400 sworn firefighters and 4,600 additional personnel. These additional personnel include uniformed emergency medical technicians (EMTs) and paramedics. Many U.S. fire departments have emergency medical service corps (EMS), which may be structurally separate from or combined with their firefighting operations, including firefighters cross-trained as EMTs and paramedics.

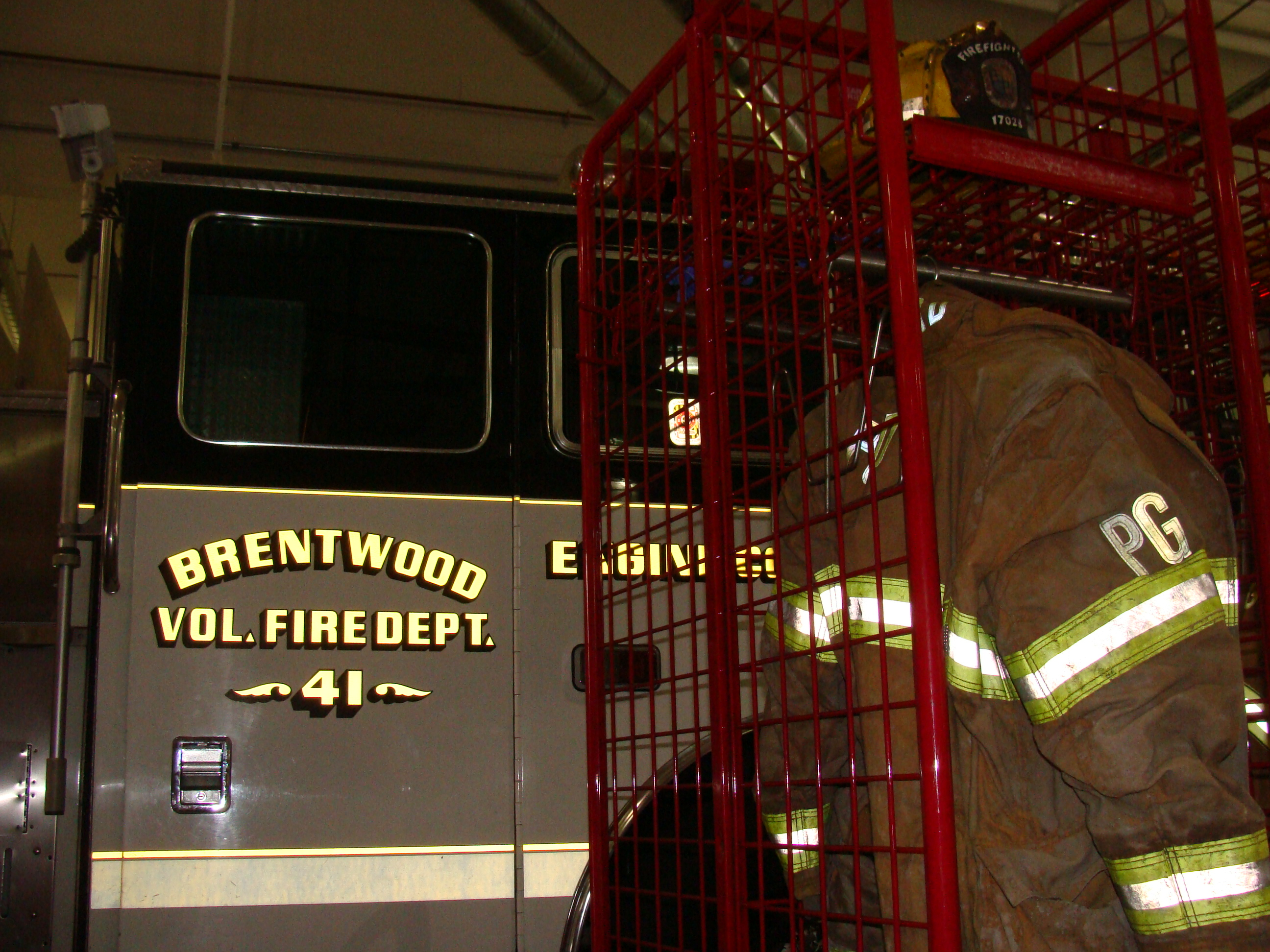
A fire fighter's turnout gear staged in front of a fire engine

According to the National Fire Department Registry, in January 2025 there were 1,207,800 firefighters in the United States (this includes career, volunteer, and paid per call firefighters as well as civilian staff and non-firefighting personnel). Of these, 14.7% are mostly or entirely career, and 85.3% are mostly or entirely volunteer. These firefighters operate out of 52,314 registered fire departments. In 2016, career firefighters represented 15% of all departments but protected approximately two-thirds of the U.S. population. Meanwhile, 85% of fire departments were volunteer or mostly volunteer and protected approximately one-third of the population.

Like most U.S. police departments or law enforcement agencies, U.S. fire departments are usually structured in a paramilitary manner. Firefighters are sworn, uniformed members of their departments. Rank-and-file firefighters are equivalent to enlisted personnel; supervisory firefighters are command officers with ranks such as lieutenant, captain, battalion chief, deputy chief, assistant chief, division chief, district chief, etc. Fire departments, especially larger ones, may also be organized into military-style echelons, such as companies, battalions, and divisions or districts. Fire departments may also have unsworn or non-uniformed members in non-firefighting capacities such as administration and civilian oversight, e.g., a board of commissioners. While adhering to a paramilitary command structure, most fire departments operate on a much less formal basis than the military.

Firefighting in the United States is becoming more of a profession than it once was. Historically, especially in smaller departments, little formal training of firefighters was required. Now, most states require both career and volunteer firefighters to complete a certificate program at a fire academy. This often includes certifications in Firefighter 1 and 2, as well as Hazardous Materials Awareness & Operations, in accordance with NFPA training standards. Associate's, bachelor's, and master's degree programs in firefighting disciplines are available at colleges and universities. Such advanced training is becoming a de facto prerequisite for command in larger departments. The U.S. Fire Administration operates the National Fire Academy, which also provides specialized firefighter training.

== Ranks and insignia ==
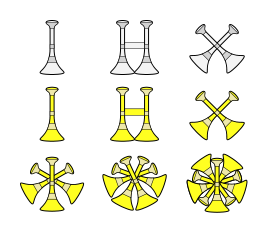
Commonly used "bugle" insignia.

There is no single standard system of rank insignia in use, but certain ranks are common. Many variations in insignia systems make use of the voice trumpet, a type of megaphone, and these are frequently referred to as a "bugle."

- Firefighter (occasionally probie) is the lowest rank. Often, it may be subdivided into grades (such as 1st class, senior, or master firefighter - typically awarded based on seniority), which may or may not be marked on the individual's badge or by uniform rank insignia.
- Many departments use drivers, engineers, or fire equipment operators. Usually, no insignia is present, but the badge will often note the rank. Some will have multiple grades of this rank.
- Lieutenant is typically used as the lowest "fire officer" rank, usually marked by a single bugle, often in silver. Some departments instead use a single bar (as in military/police fashion), again usually in silver. Others may use a single gold bugle or bar. Some departments have multiple grades of lieutenant. An older name for the same rank, still used by some fire departments, is assistant foreman.
- Captain is used in most large or municipal departments, usually being denoted with a pair of parallel bugles or parallel bars, connected by a thin cross-bar, in either silver or gold. This is frequently used as a senior supervisor role within a single company. A captain may be in command of a single-apparatus firehouse in either a municipal or small department. At a firehouse with two or more apparatus, there will typically be two captains, with one serving as the firehouse's commander. In Philadelphia, for example, a captain in charge of a ladder company is the commanding officer of that firehouse, and the captain of the engine company supervises the medic unit in that station. Although the captain only works 1 of 4 shifts as the company officer, the captain is the supervising officer of the house overall and is reported to by the lieutenants on the other 3 shifts, even when the captain is not present during those shifts. As with lieutenant, some departments still use the older style, foreman, instead of captain.
- Senior captain is rarely used, and may be shown as 2 bugles crossed.
- Battalion chief (sometimes division chief or district chief) is often the highest-ranking shift officer that is always on duty at any given time in a smaller department (i.e., operating as the shift commander); or, in the case of a larger departments comprising multiple battalions, there may be Battalion Chiefs, District Chiefs and Division Chiefs assigned to supervise a large number of fire companies and Special Units in each battalion, district or division. This is common in different parts of any city. The Boston Fire Department, for example, has 10 district chiefs who operate under 2 division chiefs citywide, supervising a total of 34 engine companies, 23 ladder companies, and 2 heavy rescue companies, along with several specialty units. This is usually the lowest rank among chiefs. Typical insignia is two crossed gold bugles or two stars, although some departments use 3 bugles or 1 star. Some are occasionally identified with an oak leaf, as with a US military Major, as in the FDNY's BC collar insignia.
- Additional chief grades usually exist between chief and battalion chief; usual insignia is 3 or 4 crossed gold bugles or 3 or 4 stars. Common titles include district chief, division chief, assistant chief, and deputy chief, etc.
- Chief is usually the highest rank of a uniformed member in any given department, traditionally shown with 5 gold bugles or 5 stars.

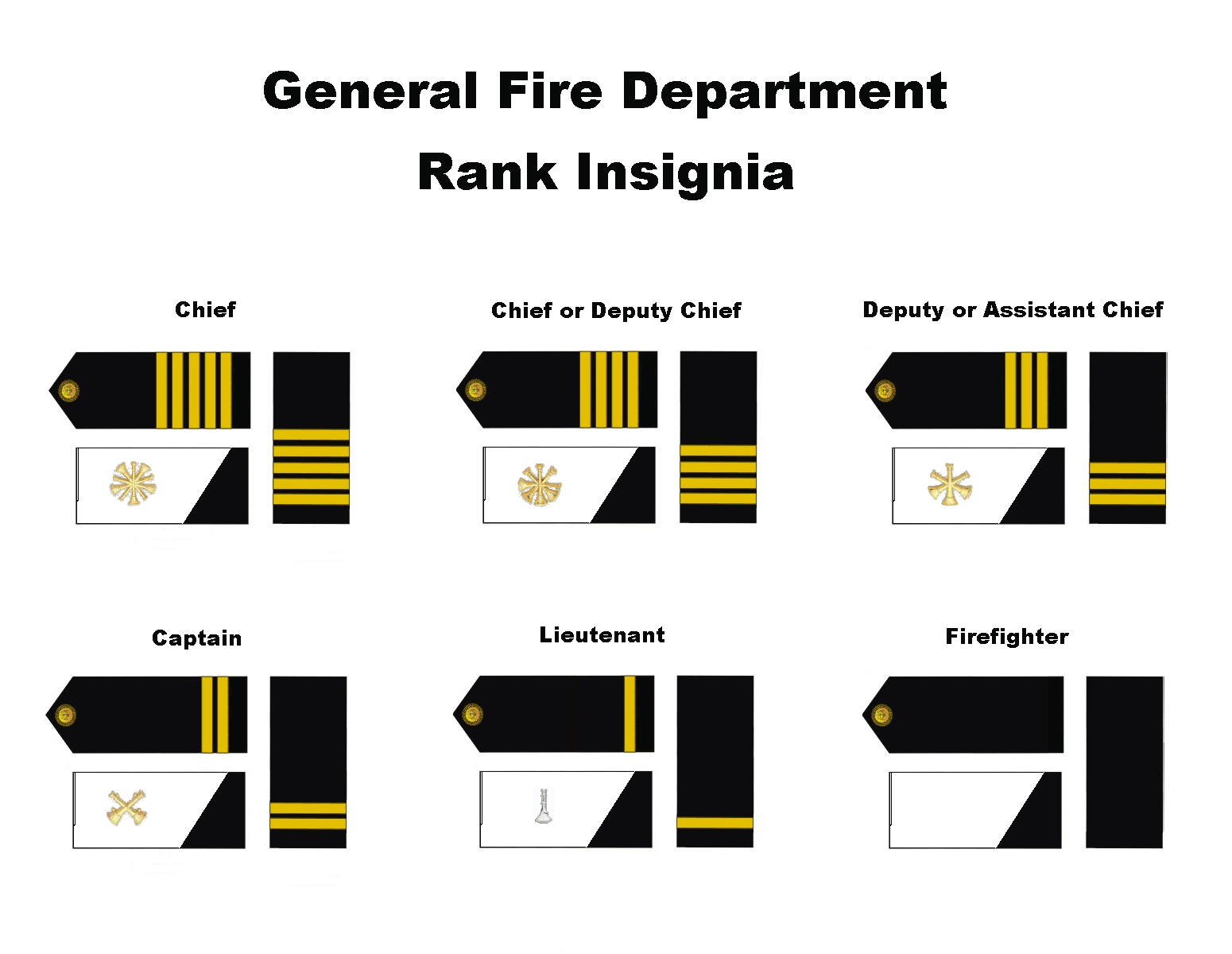
Rank insignia of professional American firefighters.

Additional ranks outside the normal chain may exist; sergeants, majors, and inspectors are other ranks used by some departments. According to the 1986 Anchorage Fire Department Explorer Handbook, the Anchorage Fire Department used a single gold bugle for inspectors and, depending on assignment, either a single silver bugle or a single gold bar for lieutenants.

Many fire departments use cuff stripes, bugles, or military-style insignia on their dress uniforms. Typically, they match the number and color of the bugles/stars worn, but variations exist.

Many departments also frequently display seniority service stripes (hash marks) on the lower-left sleeve of a dress uniform jacket, or sometimes on long-sleeved uniform shirts, with years of service varying greatly between departments (each stripe typically represents 2–5 years of service).

== Firefighter unions ==
Professional firefighter unions began forming in the late 19th and early 20th centuries to address poor working conditions and minimal safety protections. Early organizing efforts frequently faced severe political pushback and anti-union legislation. In 1918, the International Association of Fire Fighters was established in Washington, D.C., which united dozens of local chapters across the United States and Canada. Various state-based unions have also seen success, notably the New Jersey Firefighters Mutual Benevolent Association.

== See also ==
- 1978 Memphis fire and police strikes - A labor dispute involving firefighters
- Occupational hazards with fire debris cleanup
- Smokejumper
