= Mary Joy Langdon =

British nun, firefighter and riding activist

- Born: 1951 (age 74–75)
- Other names: Sister Mary Joy Langdon
- Occupations: Firefighter, religious Sister
- Known for: UK's first retained female firefighter
- Honours: British Empire Medal (BEM)

Sister Mary-Joy Langdon BEM (born 1951) is a British nun who was the first woman to be an operational firefighter in Britain on 21 August 1976. She started a pony riding centre to supply therapy and she was an Olympic flag carrier in 2012.

== Life and career ==
Langdon was born in 1951 in Battle, East Sussex. She attended Charters Towers School, Bexhill, East Sussex.

In the summer of 1976 there was a major drought in Britain and the fire brigades needed extra people. Langdon volunteered and joined the Battle fire station, close to her family farm as part of the East Sussex Fire Brigade, part-time but being on call for 24 hours. She had passed all the normal tests including carrying an 11 stone (150 lb; 70 kg) man for 100 yards. At the age of 25, she was the UK's first ever female firefighter to be formally admitted to a brigade. She joined on 21 August 1976, leaving in 1983. In 1978, women firefighters were accepted everywhere in the UK.

In 1984, Sister Mary-Joy joined the Roman Catholic congregation Sisters of the Infant Jesus.

== Wormwood Scrubs Pony Centre ==
Sister Mary-Joy founded the Wormwood Scrubs Pony Centre, a charity, in 1989. The Centre is an inner city community riding school for children and young people, many of whom have learning difficulties and physical disabilities. The children, parents and local people are encouraged to actively get involved by offering help with fund raising or joining the volunteering programmes. In 1994, the television programme Challenge Anneka built a training ground for the charity. The actor Martin Clunes and the painter Lucian Freud have been supporters. When Freud first visited, Langdon helpfully gave him a book on how to paint horses.

In 2012, she was chosen to be one of the people carrying the Olympic torch on its journey to the 2012 Summer Olympics in London.

In September 2023, Sister Mary Joy Langdon announced that she will step back from her role as Chief Executive of the Wormwood Scrubs Pony Centre in 2024 after 35 years in the position.

Sister Mary Joy's life and musical interests featured in Private Passions on BBC Radio 3, 28 December 2024.

== See also ==
- Women in firefighting
