= Shazia Parveen =

Pakistani firefighter

- Born: Vehari, Punjab.
- Occupation: Firefighter
- Father: Rehmat Ullah

Shazia Parveen is a Pakistani female firefighter. She joined Rescue 1122 emergency services in 2010.

== Personal life ==
Parveen lives in Karampur with eight family members. She was trained at Rescue 1122 in Lahore and was the only woman who completed the training.According to Parveen, she chose the profession by choice and had the support of her late father, Rehmat Ullah, a former army member. She said that she and her siblings were brought up to help people so she joined the rescue services. She said she was inspired to continue her training because she was told she would become the first female firefighter in Asia.

== Career ==
Parveen, who was 22 at the time, joined the rescue services in 2010 and started work after completing her seven months of training. She started her work at the Vehari Fire Department where she has taken part in many tasks. Her tasks involved extinguishing fires in factories and homes, mostly electrical fires.

In 2016, Parveen was promoted to lead fire instructor at the Vehari Fire Department. She was later transferred to the Thokar Niaz Baig Rescue Department of Lahore where she was appointed as a trainer. She trained new members on standard operating procedures at the Punjab Emergency Services Department. She has trained women cadets on extinguishing fires and boys and girls at a department that has received more than 1,000 new recruits.

Parveen was also featured in the book Pakistan for Women by Maleeha Abidi. The book includes some of Pakistan's most notable women and has received recognition nationally and internationally.

== Awards ==
- CCBPL award 2015

== See also ==
- Women in Pakistan
