= Brenda Berkman =

American firefighter

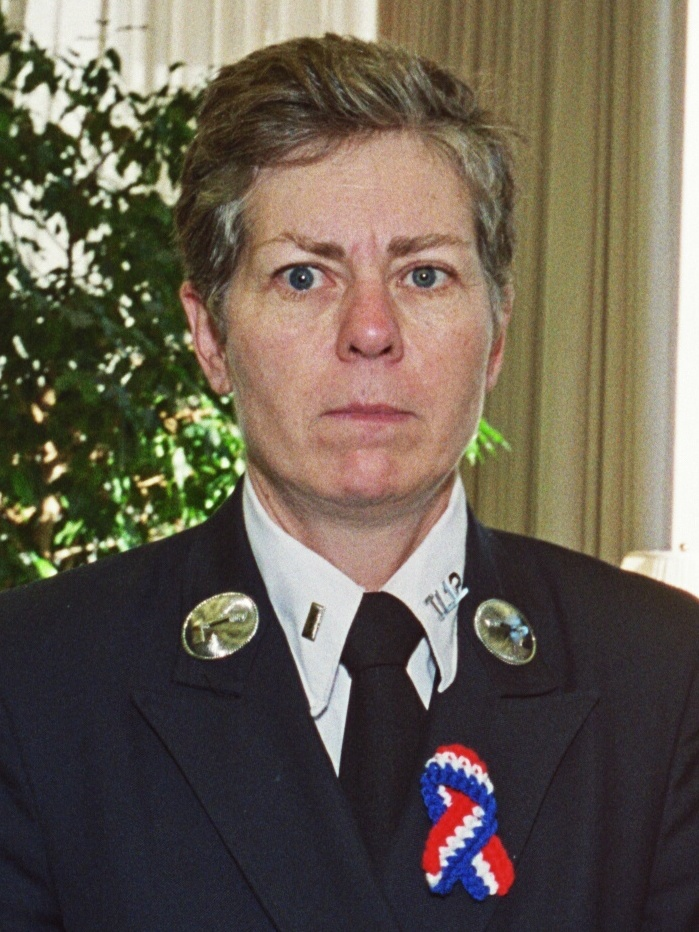
- Berkman in 2001
- Education: St. Olaf College (BA), Indiana University (MA), New York University (JD), John Jay College (MS)
- Occupations: Firefighter, artist, lawyer
- Board member of: Monumental Women
- Website: brendaberkmanartworks.com

Brenda Berkman (born 1951) is a pioneering female firefighter. She was the sole named class plaintiff in the federal sex discrimination lawsuit that opened the Fire Department of the City of New York (FDNY) to women firefighters. After she won the lawsuit in 1982, she and 40 other women became FDNY firefighters.

== Early childhood ==
Berkman grew up in Minneapolis, where as a child she became acutely aware of gender preference in favor of boys. Her application to Little League was turned down solely on the basis of her gender.

== Career ==
Brenda Berkman was enrolled in her third year of law school when the New York City Fire Department announced that women could take the exam to become firefighters in 1977. After passing the written portion of the exam, Berkman and 89 other women subsequently failed the physical portion. It was stated by an official that their physical test was “the most difficult the department had ever administered, [and] was designed more to keep women out than to accurately assess job-related skills as they were required to perform such feats as carrying a 120 pound dummy up a flight of stairs, climb an eight foot wall, and jog for one mile.”

After Berkman's requests for a fairer test were ignored, she filed an ultimately successful class-action lawsuit: Brenda Berkman, et al. v. The City of New York (1982). A new test was created in which standards were changed so the test was job-related and Berkman with 40 other women passed to enter the fire academy in 1982. (See Brenda Berkman, et al. v. The City of New York, CV-79-1813, 536 F. Supp. 177 (E.D.N.Y. 1982), aff’d Berkman v. City of New York, 705 F.2d 584 (2d Cir. 1983.))

Berkman was the founder of the United Women Firefighters in 1982, an organization for women in the FDNY. She was its first president and then elected president again multiple times until 1996.

Less than a year after joining the fire department Berkman was fired for alleged lack of physical ability, while her performance was consistently in the top tier of every task the fire department had given women. When she had returned to her firehouse on the Lower East Side to collect her belongings, the male firefighters wouldn't speak to her. As she exited in silence, they began clapping.

In 1983 Brenda Berkman and Zaida Gonzalez successfully sued to be reinstated. Judge Sifton's 56-page ruling was highly critical of the Fire Department, which the judge said had ''failed lamentably to prepare its officers and members for the extraordinary task of integrating women into its previously all-male ranks.'' While serving as firefighters, the two women were subjected to ''extensive'' sexual harassment, the judge said.

Lieutenant Berkman was off duty when the first plane hit the World Trade Center on September 11. She ran to the nearest firehouse and arrived at the site just as the North Tower collapsed. Berkman spent the rest of 9/11 and many weeks following looking for survivors and remains. Most 9/11 accounts reinforced the notion of heroes as men, often referring to firefighters as “firemen’ instead of the gender-neutral term and paid little attention to female workers at the scene. Her push to have women recognized for their contributions eventually led to the production of a video titled “The Women at Ground Zero.” Her experience was also featured in the book Women at Ground Zero: stories of courage and compassion.

She retired in 2006 at the rank of captain.

The struggle of women to join the FDNY, and Berkman's part in it, was featured in a 2006 PBS documentary called Taking The Heat.

Berkman has remained an outspoken advocate for gender equality.

== Awards ==
- Susan B. Anthony Award from the National Organization for Women (1984)
- Revson Fellowship on the Future of the City of New York, from Columbia University (1987-1988)
- New York Women's Foundation Celebrating Women Honoree (2000)
- Distinguished Alumni Award from St. Olaf College (1996)
- Women of Courage Award from the National Organization for Women (2002).
- She was also the first firefighter to be a White House Fellow.

== Artwork ==
Berkman responded to the World Trade Center attacks and in 2011 decided for the first time, to deal with her 9/11 experience in her art. She drew and created the stone lithograph print “2001”, a self-portrait depicting a bent over figure, covering her head and moving away as if under attack from above. In 2012 a self-portrait she created was exhibited at the 9/11 Decade Exhibit at the Westbeth Sculpture Gallery Annex. The series of stone lithograph images she drew and printed over three years (2015-2017) is titled “Thirty-Six Views of One World Trade Center." “Thirty-six Views” documents both the rebuilding and the memories of the World Trade Center site. The entire series was acquired by the National September 11 Memorial & Museum permanent collection, St. Olaf College (MN) and a private collector. The 36th print, the only one with color, depicts the two blue lights beamed from Ground Zero annually on 9/11.
