= Karam Pur =

Town in Vehari District, Punjab, Pakistan

Karampur (Urdu: کرَمپُور), is a town and union council in Tehsil Mailsi, District Vehari, Punjab, Pakistan.

Its geographical coordinates are 29° 54' 0" North, 72° 21' 0" East and its original name (with diacritics) is Karampur.
