= City of Charleston Fire Department =

Charleston Fire Department
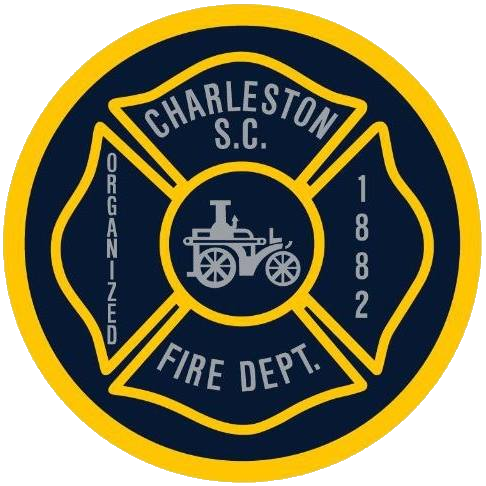

Operational area
- Country: United States
- State: South Carolina
- City: Charleston

Agency overview
- Established: 1 January 1882 (origins go back to 1819)
- Annual calls: 24660 (2025)
- Employees: 472 (2025)
- Annual budget: $34,943,437 (2018)
- Staffing: Career
- Fire chief: Chief Daniel Curia
- IAFF: 61

Facilities and equipment
- Divisions: 1
- Battalions: 4
- Stations: 19
- Engines: 19
- Trucks: 2
- Tillers: 3
- Squads: 1
- Rescues: 1
- Tenders: 1
- HAZMAT: 2
- USAR: 1
- Wildland: 2
- Fireboats: 2
- Rescue boats: 7
- Light and air: 1

Website
- Official website
- IAFF website

The City of Charleston Fire Department provides fire protection and emergency medical services to the city of Charleston, South Carolina. In all the department is responsible for an area of 109 square miles (280 km^{2}) with over 135,000 residents.

== History ==
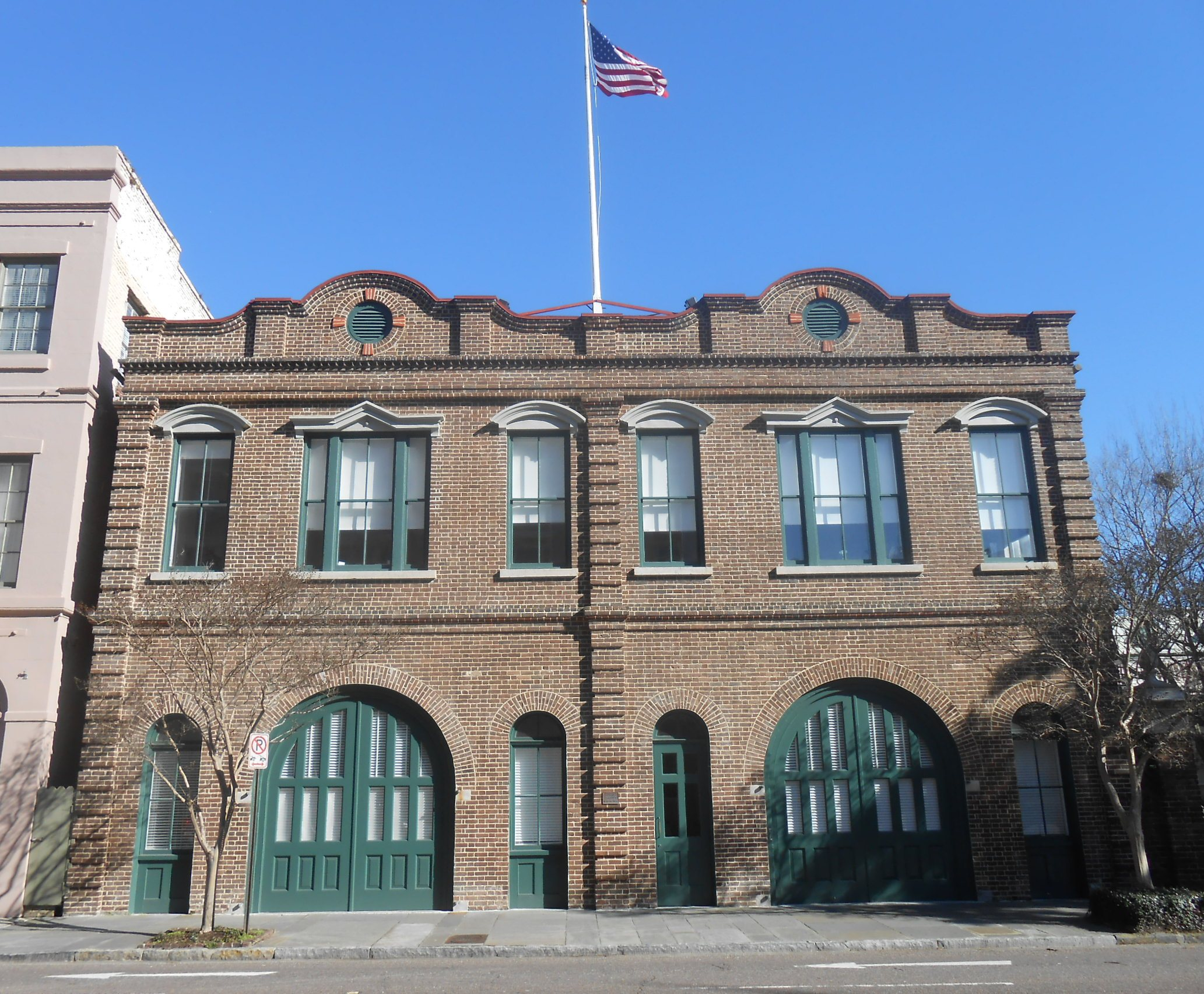
Of the three fire stations built in 1887 after the Great earthquake, only this one at 116 Meeting St. is no longer in use; it has been converted into offices.

The first fire department in Charleston was a private insurance company which responded to fires of its members only; insured houses were marked by a metal plate on the front of the house. The first fire insurance company in America, the Friendly Society, began in Charleston on February 3, 1736. The earliest records of a volunteer fire department in Charleston appear in the minutes of the Board of Firemasters dated October 18, 1819. References to a Board of Firemasters date back to at least 1792. Until January 1, 1882, the fire department was a voluntary effort; after that date, the city fire department was a paid, professional department of the city. The newly formed fire department of 1882 had 103 firemen. Its first fire pumper was bought in 1910.

Following the 1886 Charleston earthquake that devastated Charleston, the board of the Firemasters suggested selling off some stations, buying new locations, and building stations in a more strategic layout. The result was a series of three firehouses. Each one was designed by Daniel G. Wayne and cost about $28,000. The firehouse at the northeast corner of Wentworth and Meeting Streets became the most prominent and was, until 2013, the central fire house and office for the Chief of the fire department. The other two stations, built in 1887 are at 5 Cannon St. and 116 Meeting St. A new Headquarters opened on Heriot St. in November 2013. The department has a total of 17 stations with an 18th station currently (2025) under construction to house Engine 123 and several more stations in the planning process .. The new Headquarters, Station 9, was designed by Rosenblum Coe Architects is the largest fire station in Charleston and built to withstand severe storms and seismic activity.

== Stations and apparatus ==
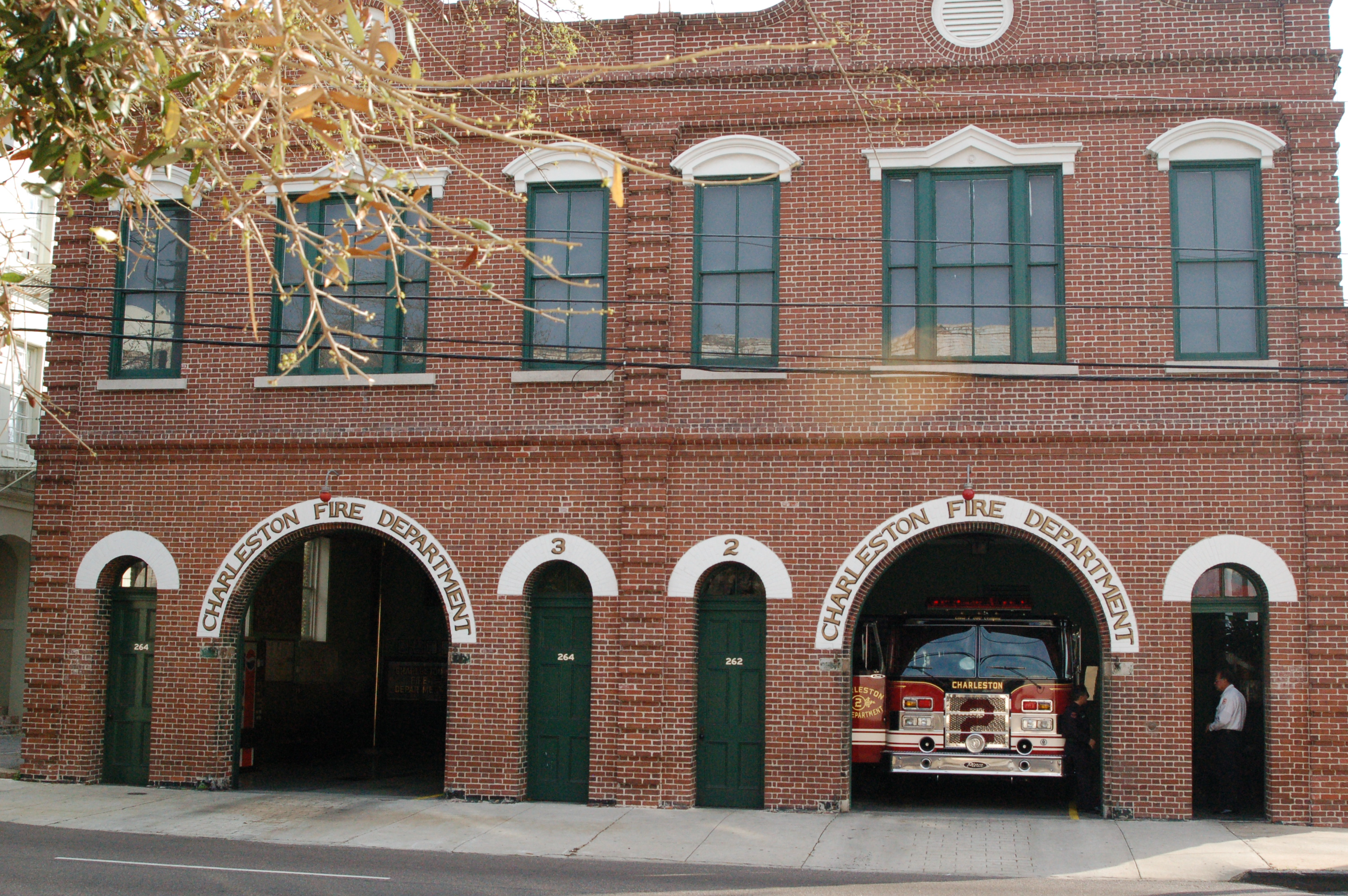
The quarters of Engine 102 and Engine 103 were built in 1887 at the northeast corner of Wentworth and Meeting Streets.

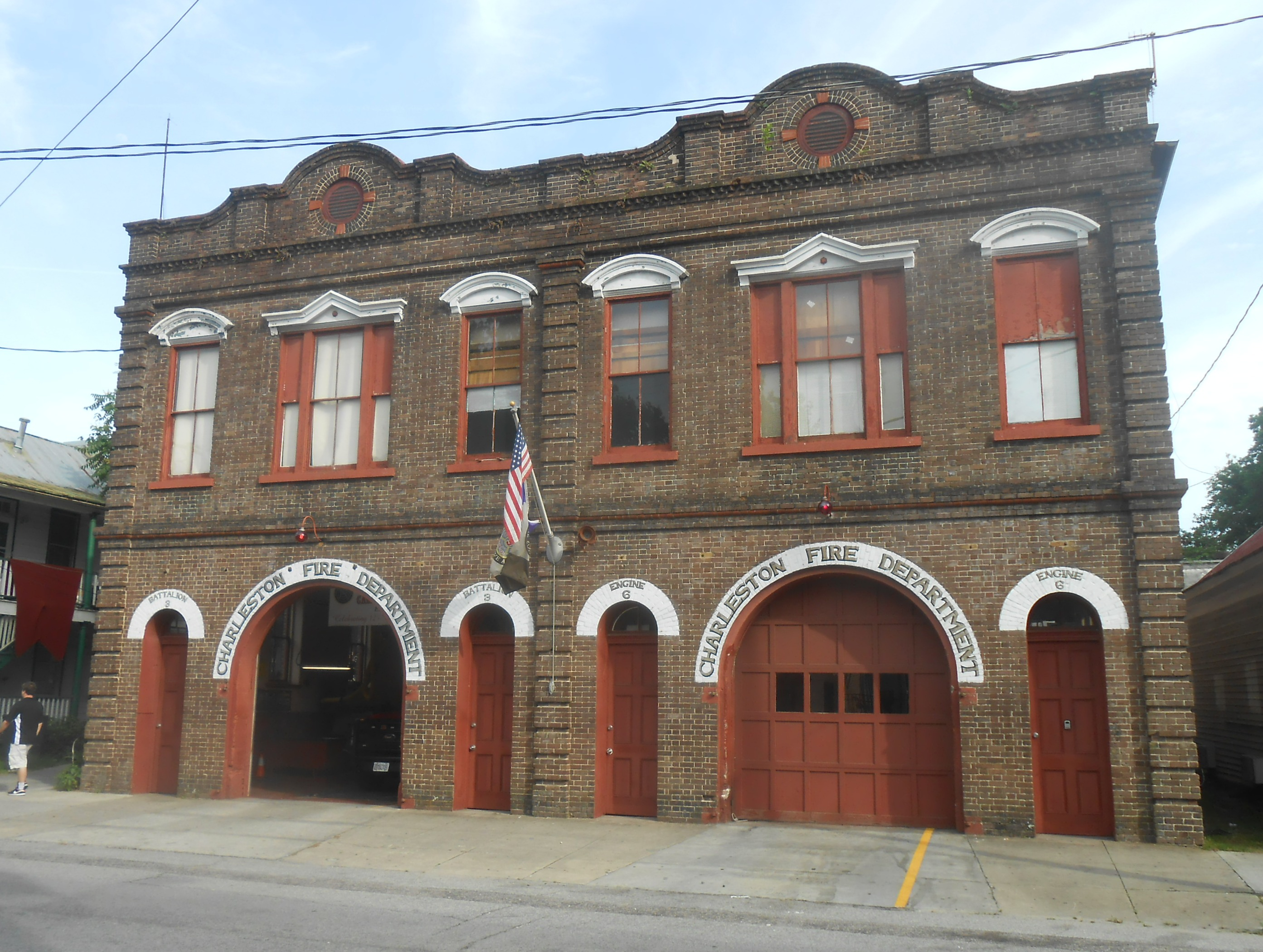
Engine 106 and Battalion 103 are located at 5 Cannon Street.

Fire Station Number	Address	Engine Company	Tower Company or Ladder (Tiller) Company	Special Unit	Chief Unit	Battalion
2/3	262/264 Meeting Street	Engine 102; Engine 103		Marine 101 Boat 102		3
6	5 Cannon Street	Engine 106			Battalion 103	3
7	1173 Fort Johnson Road	Engine 107				5
8	370 Huger Street	Engine 108				3
9	1451 King Street	Engine 109		Hazmat 109	HQ, Command Staff, Division Chief 101 (Shift Commander)	3
10	1 Nicholson Drive	Engine 110	Tower 105			5
11	1835 Savannah Hwy	Engine 111		HazMat 111 Air 101		4
12	1352 Old Towne Road	Engine 112				4
13	358 Folly Road	Engine 113			Battalion 105	5
14	3005 Memorial Drive	Engine 114			Battalion 104	4
15	162 Coming Street		Ladder 104 (Tiller)	Rescue 115		3
16	81 Ashley Hall Plantation Road	Engine 116				4
17	1830 Bohicket Road	Engine 117	Tower 106	Brush 117		5
18	235 Seven Farms Drive	Engine 118	Ladder 101 (Tiller)		Battalion 106	6
19	1985 Bees Ferry Road	Engine 119	Tower 102			4
20	1006 Pinefield Road	Engine 120		Brush 120		6
21	1165 Cainhoy Road	Engine 121		Tender 121		6

=== Emergency Medical Services ===
Emergency medical services for the City of Charleston are provided by Charleston County Emergency Medical Services (CCEMS) & Berkeley County Emergency Medical Services (BCEMS). The city is served by both Charleston & Berkeley county EMS and 911 services, since the city is part of both counties. The Charleston Fire Department provides basic life support services and assists the County's ambulatory services.

=== Fire Marshal Division ===
The CFD Fire Marshal Division (FMD) consists of a Chief Fire Marshal, three deputy fire marshals, and several assistant fire marshals. The FMD oversees inspections, plan reviews, fire investigations, and community education and risk reduction.
