= Molly Williams =

First known female and Black firefighter in the U.S.

Molly Williams (fl. 1818) was the first known female, and first known Black, firefighter in the United States.

An African American, she was a slave of the New York City merchant Benjamin Aymar. She was affiliated with the Oceanus Engine Company #11 in lower Manhattan. During her time in the company, she was called Volunteer No. 11. Williams made a distinguished presence in her sturdy work clothes of calico dress and checked apron. Her service was noted particularly during the blizzard of 1818. Male firefighters were scarce due to a cholera outbreak, but Williams took her place with the men on the dragropes and pulled the pumper to the fire through the deep snow.

When asked about her firefighting service, Williams always replied: "‘I belongs to ole ‘Leven; I allers runs wid dat ole bull-gine.’"

== See also ==
- Lillie Hitchcock Coit
