= Kent Fire and Rescue Service =

Fire and rescue service in south east England

Operational area
- Country: England
- County: Kent

Agency overview
- Employees: 2,000

Facilities and equipment
- Stations: 57
- Engines: 75

Website
- www.kent.fire-uk.org

Kent Fire and Rescue Service is the statutory fire and rescue service for the administrative county of Kent and the unitary authority area of Medway, covering a geographical area south-east of London, to the coast and including major shipping routes via the Thames and Medway rivers. The total coastline covered is 225 km (140 miles); it has 57 fire stations, and four district fire safety offices. The FRS provides emergency cover to a population of 1.88 million.

The county’s Fire and Rescue Service borders the London Fire Brigade to the north-west of the county, Surrey to the west, East Sussex to the south-west, and Essex to the north.

== Performance ==
Every fire and rescue service in England and Wales is periodically subjected to a statutory inspection by His Majesty's Inspectorate of Constabulary and Fire & Rescue Services (HMICFRS). The inspections investigate how well the service performs in each of three areas. On a scale of outstanding, good, requires improvement and inadequate, Kent Fire and Rescue Service was rated as follows:

HMICFRS Inspection Kent
Area	Rating 2018/19	Rating 2021/22	Description
Effectiveness	Good	Good	How effective is the fire and rescue service at keeping people safe and secure from fire and other risks?
Efficiency	Good	Outstanding	How efficient is the fire and rescue service at keeping people safe and secure from fire and other risks?
People	Good	Good	How well does the fire and rescue service look after its people?

== History ==
The first fire brigade appeared in Kent in 1802, when the Kent Fire Office formed an insurance brigade in Deptford (which was at the time part of Kent). In the same year, and completely separately from insurance companies, Hythe became the first town in Kent to set up its own fire brigade, followed by Ashford in 1826.

By the 20th century, it was quite fashionable for local authorities to have their own fire brigades. Maidstone had seen the formation of its borough fire brigade in 1901, when the Royal Insurance Company provided a new Shand Mason horse-drawn steam fire engine, named The Queen. This company had taken over the Kent Fire Office in the same year, simultaneously disbanding their own brigade. Things often became very competitive between individual town and village brigades, in many instances, each one trying to outdo its neighbour. In 1910, Bromley became the first town in Kent to house motorised fire engines, with two new Merryweather vehicles being stationed there.

Until 1938, the provision of a fire brigade was a discretionary power, and naturally there were a few local authorities that regarded it as an unnecessary expense. However, due to the threat of war, Parliament enacted the Fire Brigades Act 1938 (1 & 2 Geo. 6. c. 72) and made it a duty and so created over 1,600 individual fire authorities across the nation. It was these local brigades and the Auxiliary Fire Service – also formed in 1938 – that valiantly coped with the consequences of the Battle of Britain and much of The Blitz. In August 1941, local brigades and the AFS were absorbed into one organisation called The National Fire Service. It was in 1941 that the current Headquarters house The Godlands was requisitioned for war-time use by the National Fire Service and it has remained with the fire service ever since.

World War II brought dark days indeed for Kent fire-fighters. Fire-fighting has been and will probably always be a dangerous occupation, and the Roll of Honour 1899-1990, details the deaths of Kent fire-fighters while on duty. Of the 122 'Kent' names listed, 15 were pre-1939, 16 were post-1939 and 91 died during World War II. Nationally, well over 1,000 fire-fighters died during World War II, with stories of fire stations and the water supplies needed for fire-fighting being targeted by German bombers, to maximise the damage caused by incendiary bombs. The last death on duty of a Kent fire-fighter was in 1990.

The fire service was returned to local authority control on 1 April 1948 under the Fire Services Act 1947, with responsibility in England and Wales being given to the 146 counties and county boroughs of the day. The County of Kent and the City and County Borough of Canterbury combined to form Kent Fire Brigade, taking over 79 fire stations from the National Fire Service.

Subsequent local government reorganisations have had their effect upon the brigade, most significantly in 1965 when eight fire stations in the northwest of the county were transferred to the newly created Greater London area. Further reorganisation in 1974 saw Canterbury lose its county borough status and the fire brigade became the exclusive responsibility of Kent County Council. In 1998, the structure of local government changed again and Kent combined with the new Medway Towns unitary authority for fire brigade provision.

On 1 October 2003, Kent Fire Brigade was renamed Kent Fire and Rescue Service to better reflect the requirements demanded of it for many years. These changes were reflected nationally by the enactment of the Fire and Rescue Services Act 2004 which came into effect on 1 October 2004.

In the spring of 2011, Kent Fire and Rescue underwent changes to its structure, these included restructuring from three divisions to fivearea groups: North Kent, East Kent, West Kent, South Kent and Mid Kent. Each group consists of a number of clusters, which are made up of a number of certain stations where resources are locally managed. The Letter prefix for each division was dropped in the station call sign, for instance Swanley, under the old system was named as Station S31 the S standing for South Division, now it is just Station 31.

On 1 January 2017 Kent Fire & Rescue Service ceased Watches and changed to Flexible rostering with every station. This meant all members of staff had to work a 'Contractual number of shifts over the course of each calendar year'.

== Fire station crewing ==
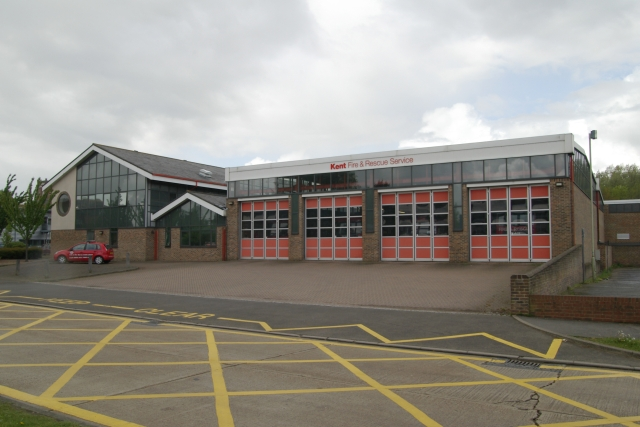
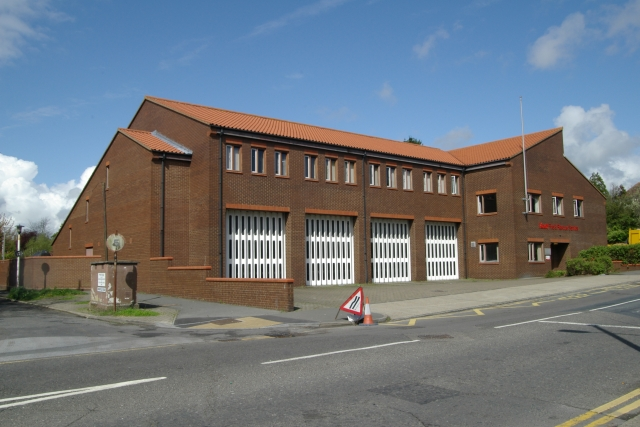
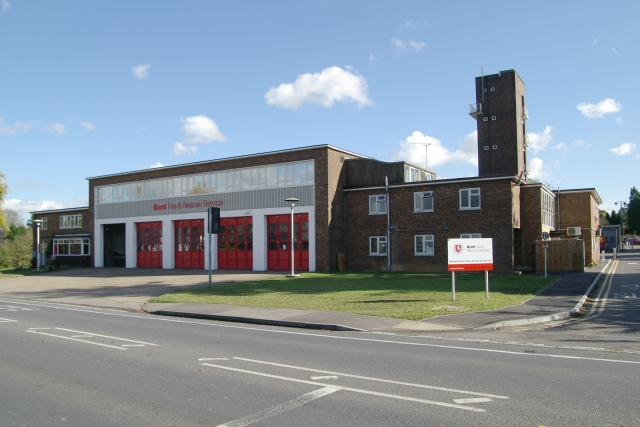
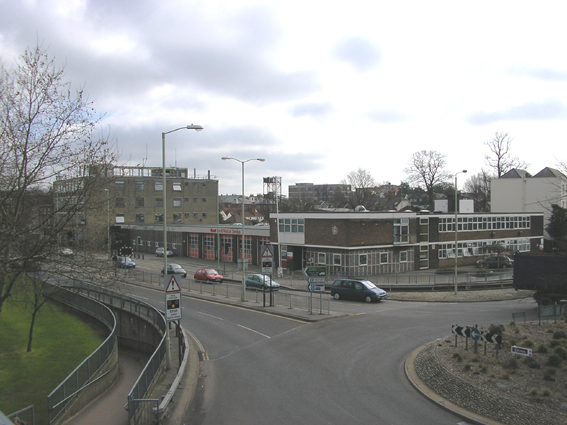
Clockwise from top left: Some of the service's fire stations in Ashford, Folkestone, Canterbury and Maidstone

Kent Fire & Rescue Service's fire stations are crewed using a number of different duty systems:

- Wholetime – fire appliances are crewed by full-time firefighters 24/7. Flexible Rostering system.
- "On-call" – retained firefighters are summoned by electronic pager and respond from their usual jobs or from home when required. All retained (and day-crewed) firefighters must live or work within five minutes of the fire station.
- Day-crewed – these fire appliances, and any attached special appliances are crewed as wholetime appliances during the daytime and crewed as ‘on-call’ appliances at night by the same firefighters. Any second fire engine based there will be entirely staffed as retained on-call.
- Cross-crewing – a cost-cutting measure where multiple fire appliances are staffed by the same crew. This means when one appliance responds any others in the scheme are unavailable.

The service works in partnership with the South East Coast Ambulance Service to provide emergency medical cover to select areas of Kent. Dymchurch, Eastchurch, Eastry, Hoo and Paddock Wood have been identified as having a greater need for ambulance cover. The aim of a fire service co-responder team is to preserve life until the arrival of either a Rapid Response Vehicle (RRV) or an Ambulance.

== See also ==
- Fire Service in the United Kingdom
- List of British firefighters killed in the line of duty
