= Fire Brigades Act 1938 =

Act of the Parliament of the United Kingdom

Fire Brigades Act 1938 (Note: Section 30(1).)
- Act of Parliament
- Parliament of the United Kingdom
- Long title: An Act to make further provision for fire services in Great Britain and for purposes connected therewith.
- Citation: 1 & 2 Geo. 6. c. 72
- Territorial extent: England and Wales; Scotland; (Note: Section 30(2).)

Dates
- Royal assent: 29 July 1938
- Commencement: 29 July 1938 (Note: The Acts of Parliament (Commencement) Act 1793.)
- Repealed: 31 July 1947
Other legislation
Amends	Town Police Clauses Act 1847; Poor Law Amendment Act 1867; Police Act 1893; Local Government Act 1894
Amended by	Local Government (Scotland) Act 1947
Repealed by	Fire Services Act 1947

Status: Repealed

Text of statute as originally enacted

The Fire Brigades Act 1938 (1 & 2 Geo. 6. c. 72) was an act of the Parliament of the United Kingdom. The act was the primary legislation for Great Britain, excluding London, that placed responsibility for the provision of a fire brigade onto the local authority, and away from the insurance companies.

== Background ==
The act was passed following a report by the Departmental Committee on Fire Brigade Services 1935, which was also known as the Riverdale Committee in reference to its chairman, Lord Riverdale.

== Subsequent developments ==
The act was only in force for a short time before in 1941 all local authority fire services in Great Britain were transferred to the National Fire Service. After World War II new legislation was passed and the Fire Services Act 1947 (10 & 11 Geo. 6. c. 41) took over as the primary legislation dealing with fire services in Great Britain.

== See also ==
- Fire service in the United Kingdom
- Fire Services Act 1947
- Fire Services Act 1951
- Fire Services Act 1959
- Fire and Rescue Services Act 2004
- Fire (Scotland) Act 2005
