= Cornwall Fire and Rescue Service =

Service in South West England

Operational area
- Country: England
- County: Cornwall

Agency overview
- Employees: 374 full-time equivalent (2019)
- Chief Fire Officer: Kathryn Billing

Facilities and equipment
- Divisions: 8
- Stations: 31
- Platforms: 2

Website
- www.cornwall.gov.uk/fire

Cornwall Fire and Rescue Service is the statutory fire and rescue service covering Cornwall, England. As of April 2019, the service employs over 400 retained firefighters, 203 full-time firefighters, plus 170 support and administrative staff. Created under the Fire Services Act 1947 as "Cornwall County Fire Brigade", the name changed to "Cornwall Fire and Rescue Service" on 1 October 2009.

The service is administered by Cornwall Council, with a new service headquarters (SHQ) at Tolvaddon opened in 2015.

== History ==
As part of the FiReControl project, the control room was planned to switch over to the regional control centre in Taunton, Somerset, that would be shared between neighbouring services in South West England. Originally scheduled to take place in July 2010, the cutover date was revised to January 2012, however the plan was scrapped in December 2010.

== Operations ==
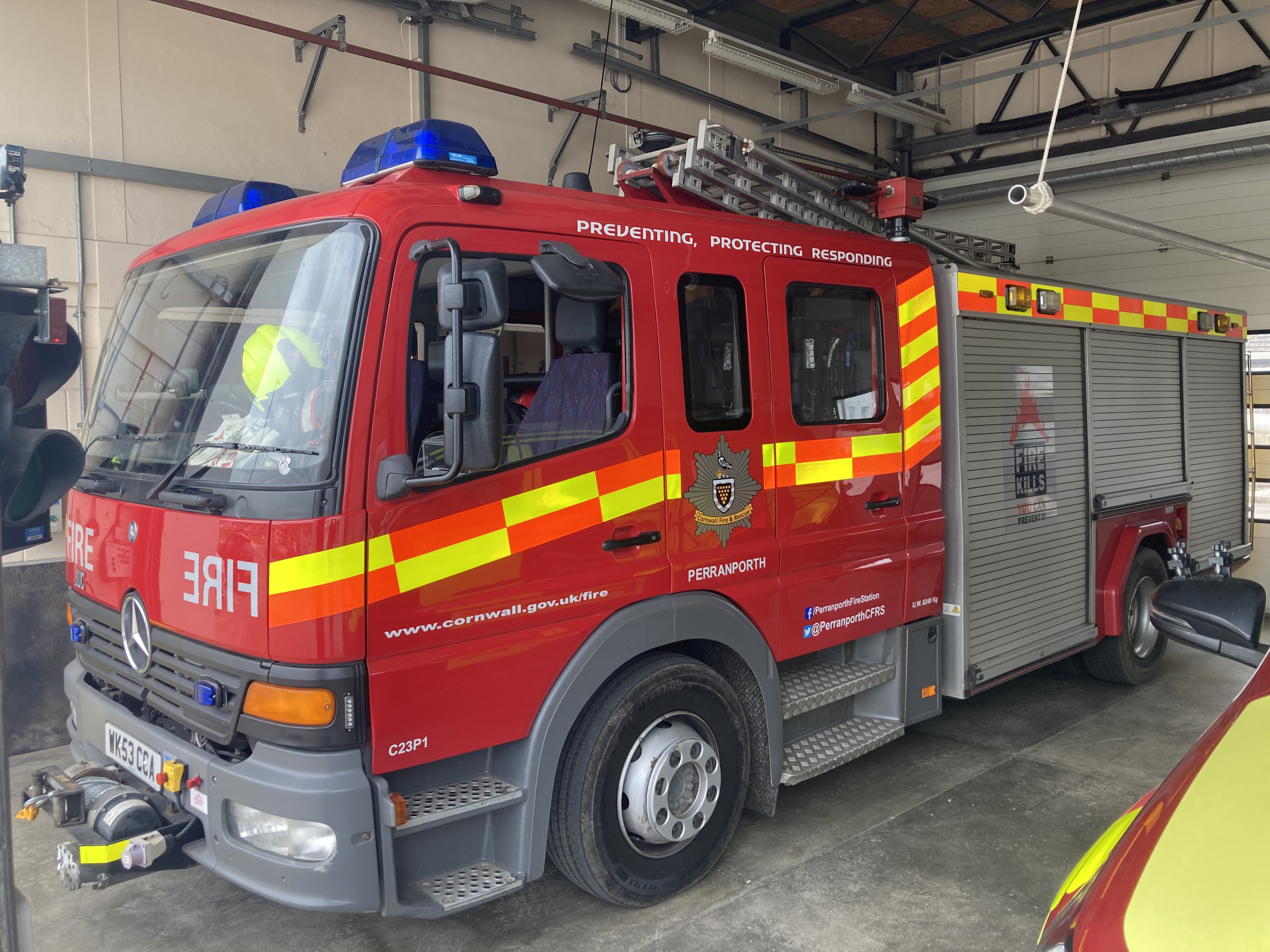
Fire appliance at Perranporth community fire station in June 2023

Cornwall Fire and Rescue Service operates 31 fire stations, which are organised into three service delivery areas: Mid, East and West.

The fire stations are manned by three different systems:

- Wholetime – stations manned by four watches of wholetime fire fighters from 07:00 to 19:00, and 19:00 to 07:00. These stations are supported by retained firefighters.
- Wholetime day – stations manned by two watches of wholetime firefighters from 07:00 to 19:00, and by retained firefighters at other times.
- On-call – stations manned by retained firefighters.

Cornwall Fire and Rescue Service works in partnership with South Western Ambulance Service to provide emergency medical cover to area of Cornwall. These are areas that have been identified as having a greater need for ambulance cover. The aim of a co-responder team is to preserve life until the arrival of either a rapid response vehicle (RRV) or an ambulance. Co-responder vehicles are equipped with oxygen and automated external defibrillator (AED) equipment, as is every one of the service's fire stations.

The service arranges its fire stations into three geographic areas: East, Mid, and West.

The service workshop and stores are located at the Tolvaddon SHQ.

== Performance ==
Every fire and rescue service in England and Wales is periodically subjected to a statutory inspection by His Majesty's Inspectorate of Constabulary and Fire & Rescue Services (HMICFRS). The inspections investigate how well the service performs in each of three areas. On a scale of outstanding, good, requires improvement and inadequate, Cornwall Fire and Rescue Service was rated as follows:

HMICFRS Inspection Cornwall
Area	Rating 2018/19	Rating 2021/22	Description
Effectiveness	Requires improvement	Requires improvement	How effective is the fire and rescue service at keeping people safe and secure from fire and other risks?
Efficiency	Requires improvement	Requires improvement	How efficient is the fire and rescue service at keeping people safe and secure from fire and other risks?
People	Good	Requires improvement	How well does the fire and rescue service look after its people?

== Mutual assistance ==
The Fire and Rescue Services Act 2004, gives fire services the power to assist other fire services or fire authorities in what is known as mutual assistance, for example with Devon and Somerset Fire and Rescue Service.

== Notable incidents ==
- SS Torrey Canyon disaster, 18 March 1967 – This incident saw possibly the largest fire brigade attendance in UK history: 78 different brigades (with over 200 appliances, 147 of which responded from London Fire Brigade) and 38 different military units spread detergent and pumped out contaminated water. The clean-up lasted months and the brigades stayed on-site throughout working 24/7. Cornwall Fire Brigade set up a workshop near the Lizard to maintain the appliances on-site whilst refilling them and portable pumps with petrol. At the height of the operation over 1,600 personnel were on scene.
- Boscastle flooding, 16 August 2004 – The first call came into Fire Control in Truro at 16:00 to report a person trapped in a car with the water rising. At 17:30 a major incident was declared and search and rescue helicopters from RNAS Culdrose along with other helicopters throughout the Southwest assisted the fire brigade and Coastguard in evacuating people. 25 appliances attended the scene along with a further 22 for relief purposes. Although the brigade could not do anything with regard to the pumping out of water they assisted searching for persons trapped in their cars and homes and helped bring them to safety via the RNAS search and rescue helicopter. The brigade also carried out salvage work once the water had receded. The brigade were in attendance for a number of days with nearly the whole of the brigades pumping resources in attendance as either first response or as a relief crew.
- Penhallow Hotel fire, 18 August 2007 – The first 999 call was received at 00:17; crews from Newquay were first on-scene and requested further appliances to attend. The fire consumed all three floors of the hotel and three people died at the scene. 25 pumps attended along with many support appliances; Devon and Somerset Fire and Rescue Service also provided a turntable ladder, officers and USAR assistance. The cause of the fire is believed to be arson, but no one was ever charged.
- A+P Falmouth Docks fire, 17 June 2011 – At around 8:00, a worker was changing over an acetylene cylinder when the tank began to vent and the gas ignited; this in turn ignited other venting tanks. On arrival of the fire brigade a 300-metre (980 ft) cordon was put in place which required the docks and many surrounding houses to be evacuated. The brigade extinguished the initial fire but then had to cool the cylinders constantly for 24-hours to prevent them from exploding due to the heat and build-up of pressure. In total Cornwall FRS sent six pumping appliances, one command support unit, one operational support unit and one welfare vehicle. The incident lasted for 24-hours and required numerous relief crews to attend overnight.

== Other emergency services ==
- Cornwall Air Ambulance
- South Western Ambulance Service
- Devon and Cornwall Constabulary
- HM Coastguard
- Royal National Lifeboat Institution (RNLI)

== See also ==
- List of British firefighters killed in the line of duty
