= Gloucestershire Fire and Rescue Service =

Fire and rescue service in western England

Operational area
- Country: England
- County: Gloucestershire

Agency overview
- Employees: ~600

Facilities and equipment
- Stations: 22

Website
- www.gloucestershire.gov.uk/glosfire

The Gloucestershire Fire and Rescue Service is the statutory emergency fire and rescue service for the non-metropolitan county of Gloucestershire, England. The service is run by Gloucestershire County Council. The service does not cover the unitary authority of South Gloucestershire which is covered by Avon Fire and Rescue Service.

The service's headquarters are located at the TriService Emergency Centre in Quedgeley, near Gloucester. Also operating from there are Gloucestershire Constabulary and South Western Ambulance Service.

An inspectors report in 2019 rated the service as "inadequate" and had "a culture of bullying and harassment.".

== Performance ==
Every fire and rescue service in England and Wales is periodically subjected to a statutory inspection by His Majesty's Inspectorate of Constabulary and Fire & Rescue Services (HMICFRS). The inspection investigates how well the service performs in each of three areas. On a scale of outstanding, good, requires improvement and inadequate, Gloucestershire Fire and Rescue Service was rated as follows:

HMICFRS Inspection Gloucestershire
Area	Rating 2018/19	Rating 2021/22	Description
Effectiveness	Requires Improvement	Requires Improvement	How effective is the fire and rescue service at keeping people safe and secure from fire and other risks?
Efficiency	Requires Improvement	Requires Improvement	How efficient is the fire and rescue service at keeping people safe and secure from fire and other risks?
People	Requires Improvement	Inadequate	How well does the fire and rescue service look after its people?

== Fire stations ==
The service has 21 fire stations, 16 of which are crewed by retained firefighters; and five which are either wholetime, or a mix of wholetime and retained.

Wholetime fire stations:

- Cheltenham West
- Gloucester South

Wholetime and retained fire stations:

- Cheltenham East
- Gloucester North
- Stroud

Retained fire stations:

- Chipping Camden
- Cinderford
- Cirencester
- Coleford
- Dursley
- Fairford
- Lydney
- Moreton-In-Marsh
- Nailsworth
- Newent
- Northleach
- Stow-On-The-Wold
- Tetbury
- Tewkesbury
- Winchcombe
- Wotton-Under-Edge

Tewkesbury fire station is also home to Severn Area Rescue Association, which has based one of its five River Severn rescue stations there.

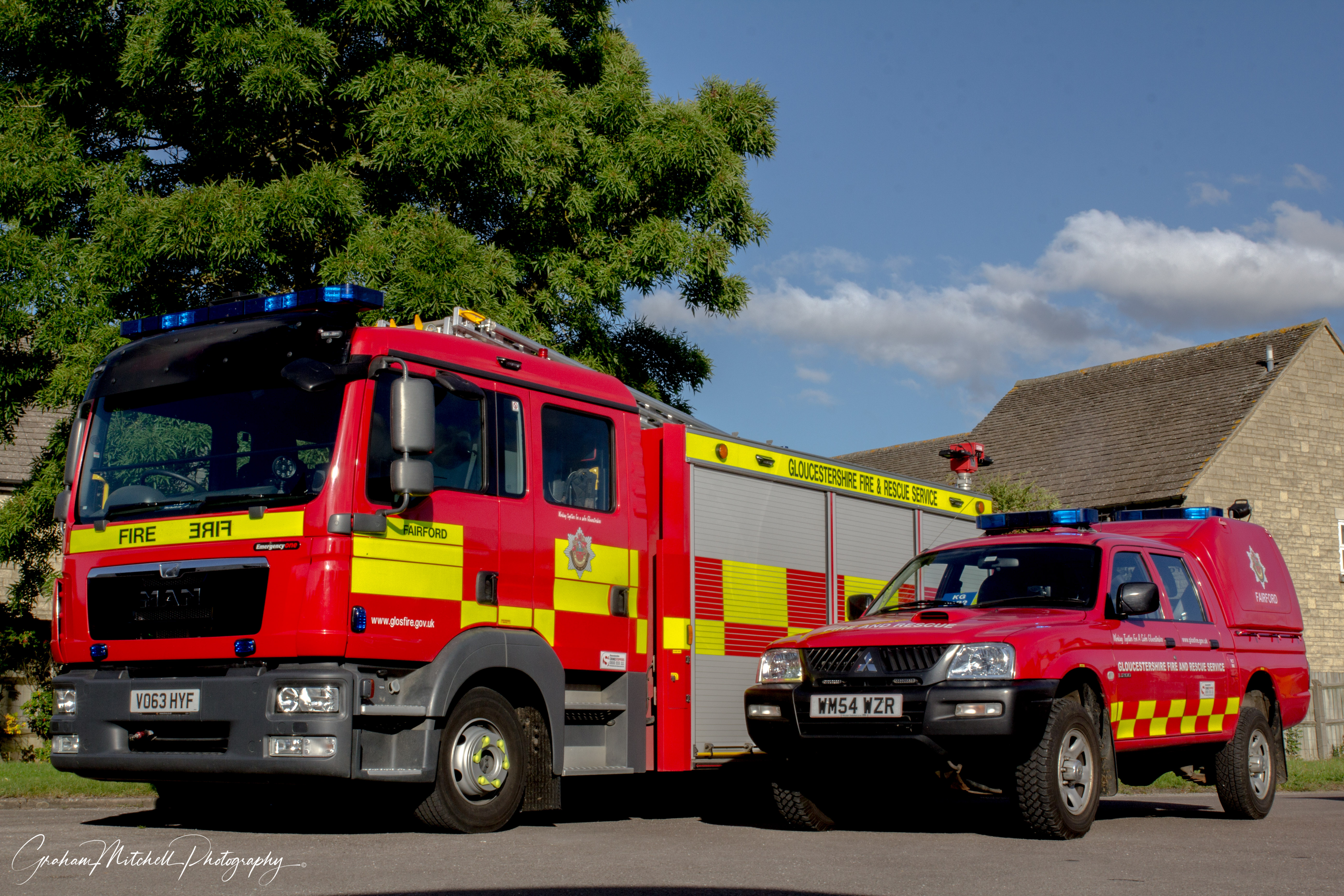
Gloucestershire fire appliances

=== Co-responder stations ===
Gloucestershire Fire and Rescue Service works in partnership with the South West Ambulance Service to provide emergency medical cover to select areas of Gloucestershire. Lydney, Coleford, Newent, Wotton-Under-Edge, Dursley, Chipping Camden, and Tetbury have been identified as having the greatest need for ambulance cover. The aim of a fire service co-responder team is to preserve life until the arrival of either a Rapid Response Vehicle (RRV) or an Ambulance.

== See also ==
- Fire service in the United Kingdom
- List of British firefighters killed in the line of duty
