= FSA =

FSA may refer to:

== Organizations ==
=== Government ===
- Federal Security Agency, a US government entity from 1939 to 1953
- Family Support Administration, now part of the US Department of Health and Human Services
- Farm Security Administration, now the Farmers Home Administration in the US
- Farm Service Agency, part of the US Department of Agriculture
- Food Science Australia, now known as the CSIRO Division of Food and Nutritional Science
- Food Standards Agency, a British regulator
- Federal Student Aid, an office of the US Department of Education
- Federation of South Arabia, now part of Yemen
- Freedom Support Act, a 1992 US law

=== Financial regulators ===
- Financial Services Agency, for Japan
- Financial Services Authority, formerly for the UK
- Financial Services Authority (Isle of Man)
- Financial Supervisory Authority (Sweden)

=== Education ===
- Flint Southwestern Academy, in Michigan, US
- Florida Student Association
- Foreign Service Academy, in Pakistan

=== Professional titles and associations ===
- Fellow of the Society of Actuaries, in North America
- Fellow of the Society of Antiquaries of London
- Fellow of the Society of Antiquaries of Scotland, normally given as "FSA Scot"
- Florida Sheriffs Association, a non-profit professional association

=== Sport ===
- FC FSA Voronezh, a Russian football club
- Federation of Sports Arenas, the former name of the Premier Arena Soccer League
- Football South Australia, the governing body of association football in South Australia
- Football Supporters' Association, the national organisation for football supporters in England and Wales
- Salvadorian Athletics Federation (Spanish: Federación Salvadoreña de Atletismo)
- Saxony-Anhalt Football Association (German: Fußballverband Sachsen-Anhalt)

=== Other organizations ===
- Financial Security Assurance, an American insurance company
- FSA Corporation, now part of the Canadian computer company McAfee Associates
- Fran Silvestre Arquitectos, a studio based in Valencia
- Free Spirit Alliance, an American non-profit organization serving the Pagan and Pantheist communities
- Free Syrian Army, an opposition army group
  - Syrian National Army, a group of Free Syrian Army subunits which sometimes use the term to refer to their formation specifically.

== Finance ==
- Financial statement analysis
- Financial Services Act (disambiguation)
- Flexible spending account, employer-funded medical savings account

== Science and technology ==
- Fast statistical alignment
- Finite-state automaton
- Forward scattering alignment

== Other uses ==
- Fire Services Act (disambiguation)
- Flying Saucer Attack, an English rock band
- Forward Sortation Area, part of a Canadian postal code
