= Fire Services Act =

Fire Services Act may refer to:

- Fire Services Act 1947 of the Parliament of the United Kingdom
- Fire Services Act 1951 of the Parliament of the United Kingdom
- Fire Services Act 1959 of the Parliament of the United Kingdom
