= List of Scottish statutory instruments, 2005 =

This is a complete list of Scottish statutory instruments in 2005.

== 1-100 ==
- Food Labelling (Added Phytosterols or Phytostanols) (Scotland) Regulations 2005 (S.S.I. 2005/1)
- National Health Service (Travelling Expenses and Remission of Charges) (Scotland) Amendment Regulations 2005 (S.S.I. 2005/3)
- Sexual Offences Act 2003 (Prescribed Police Stations) (Scotland) Amendment Regulations 2005 (S.S.I. 2005/9)
- School Education (Ministerial Powers and Independent Schools) (Scotland) Act 2004 (Commencement No. 1) Order 2005 (S.S.I. 2005/10)
- Road Traffic (Permitted Parking Area and Special Parking Area) (South Lanarkshire Council) Designation Order 2005 (S.S.I. 2005/11)
- Parking Attendants (Wearing of Uniforms) (South Lanarkshire Council Parking Area) Regulations 2005 (S.S.I. 2005/12)
- Road Traffic (Parking Adjudicators) (South Lanarkshire Council) Regulations 2005 (S.S.I. 2005/13)
- Non-Domestic Rate (Scotland) Order 2005 (S.S.I. 2005/14)
- Holyrood Park Amendment Regulations 2005 (S.S.I. 2005/15)
- Food Protection (Emergency Prohibitions) (Amnesic Shellfish Poisoning) (Orkney) (No. 2) (Scotland) Order 2004 Revocation Order 2005 (S.S.I. 2005/16)
- Land Reform (Scotland) Act 2003 (Commencement No. 3) Order 2005 (S.S.I. 2005/17)
- Community Reparation Orders (Requirements for Consultation and Prescribed Activities) (Scotland) Regulations 2005 (S.S.I. 2005/18)
- Local Government Finance (Scotland) Order 2005 (S.S.I. 2005/19)
- Act of Sederunt (Ordinary Cause Rules) Amendment (Caution and Security) 2005 (S.S.I. 2005/20)
- Waste (Scotland) Regulations 2005 (S.S.I. 2005/22)
- Conservation of Salmon (Esk Salmon Fishery District) Regulations 2005 (S.S.I. 2005/24)
- Higher Education Act 2004 (Commencement No. 1) (Scotland) Order 2005 (S.S.I. 2005/33)
- Food Protection (Emergency Prohibitions) (Amnesic Shellfish Poisoning) (West Coast) (Scotland) Order 2005 (S.S.I. 2005/34)
- Parking Attendants (Wearing of Uniforms) (South Lanarkshire Council Parking Area) (No. 2) Regulations 2005 (S.S.I. 2005/35)
- Electronic Fingerprinting etc. Device Approval (Scotland) Order 2005 (S.S.I. 2005/36)
- Conservation of Salmon (River Annan Salmon Fishery District) Regulations 2005 (S.S.I. 2005/37)
- Potatoes Originating in Egypt (Scotland) Amendment Regulations 2005 (S.S.I. 2005/39)
- Criminal Procedure (Amendment) (Scotland) Act 2004 (Incidental, Supplemental and Consequential Provisions) Order 2005 (S.S.I. 2005/40)
- Valuation for Rating (Decapitalisation Rate) (Scotland) Regulations 2005 (S.S.I. 2005/41)
- European Communities (Matrimonial and Parental Responsibility Jurisdiction and Judgments) (Scotland) Regulations 2005 (S.S.I. 2005/42)
- Antisocial Behaviour (Noise Control) (Scotland) Regulations 2005 (S.S.I. 2005/43)
- Act of Adjournal (Criminal Procedure Rules Amendment) (Criminal Procedure (Amendment) (Scotland) Act 2004) 2005 (S.S.I. 2005/44)
- Council Tax (Discount for Unoccupied Dwellings) (Scotland) Regulations 2005 (S.S.I. 2005/51)
- Waste and Emissions Trading Act 2003 (Commencement) (Scotland) Order 2005 (S.S.I. 2005/52)
- Domestic Water and Sewerage Charges (Reduction) (Scotland) Regulations 2005 (S.S.I. 2005/53)
- Water Services Charges (Billing and Collection) (Scotland) Order 2005 (S.S.I. 2005/54)
- Food Protection (Emergency Prohibitions) (Amnesic Shellfish Poisoning) (Orkney) (No. 3) (Scotland) Order 2004 Revocation Order 2005 (S.S.I. 2005/56)
- Act of Sederunt (Registration Appeal Court) 2005 (S.S.I. 2005/59)
- Act of Sederunt (Summary Applications, Statutory Applications and Appeals etc. Rules) Amendment (Land Reform (Scotland) Act 2003) 2005 (S.S.I. 2005/61)
- Housing Revenue Account General Fund Contribution Limits (Scotland) Order 2005 (S.S.I. 2005/62)
- Water (Prevention of Pollution) (Code of Practice) (Scotland) Order 2005 (S.S.I. 2005/63)
- Less Favoured Area Support Scheme (Scotland) Amendment Regulations 2005 (S.S.I. 2005/64)
- Land Reform (Scotland) Act 2003 (Modification) Order 2005 (S.S.I. 2005/65)
- Possession of Pesticides (Scotland) Order 2005 (S.S.I. 2005/66)
- Sea Fish (Prohibited Methods of Fishing) (Firth of Clyde) Order 2005 (S.S.I. 2005/67)
- Food Protection (Emergency Prohibitions) (Amnesic Shellfish Poisoning) (West Coast) (Nos. 5 and 9) (Scotland) Orders 2004 Partial Revocation Order 2005 (S.S.I. 2005/68)
- Food Protection (Emergency Prohibitions) (Amnesic Shellfish Poisoning) (West Coast) (No. 2) (Scotland) Order 2005 (S.S.I. 2005/69)
- Food (Pistachios from Iran) (Emergency Control) (Scotland) Amendment Regulations 2005 (S.S.I. 2005/70)
- Food Protection (Emergency Prohibitions) (Radioactivity in Sheep) Partial Revocation (Scotland) Order 2005 (S.S.I. 2005/71)
- Annual Close Time (Esk Salmon Fishery District) Order 2005 (S.S.I. 2005/72)
- Potatoes Originating in the Netherlands (Notification) (Scotland) Order 2005 (S.S.I. 2005/73)
- Potatoes Originating in the Netherlands (Scotland) Revocation Regulations 2005 (S.S.I. 2005/74)
- Act of Sederunt (Fees in the National Archives of Scotland) 2005 (S.S.I. 2005/77)
- Police (Retention and Disposal of Motor Vehicles) (Scotland) Regulations 2005 (S.S.I. 2005/80)
- Poultry Meat, Farmed Game Bird Meat and Rabbit Meat (Hygiene and Inspection) Amendment (Scotland) Regulations 2005 (S.S.I. 2005/81)
- National Assistance (Assessment of Resources) Amendment (Scotland) Regulations 2005 (S.S.I. 2005/82)
- National Assistance (Sums for Personal Requirements) (Scotland) Regulations 2005 (S.S.I. 2005/84)
- Water Environment (Drinking Water Protected Areas) (Scotland) Order 2005 (S.S.I. 2005/88)
- Food Protection (Emergency Prohibitions) (Amnesic Shellfish Poisoning) (West Coast) (No. 7) (Scotland) Order 2004 Partial Revocation Order 2005 (S.S.I. 2005/89)
- Sea Fishing (Restriction on Days at Sea) (Scotland) Order 2005 (S.S.I. 2005/90)
- Dairy Produce Quotas (Scotland) Regulations 2005 (S.S.I. 2005/91)
- Plastic Materials and Articles in Contact with Food Amendment (Scotland) Regulations 2005 (S.S.I. 2005/92)
- Criminal Legal Aid (Fixed Payments) (Scotland) Amendment Regulations 2005 (S.S.I. 2005/93)
- Colours in Food Amendment (Scotland) Regulations 2005 (S.S.I. 2005/94)
- National Health Service (General Dental Services) (Scotland) Amendment Regulations 2005 (S.S.I. 2005/95)
- Regulation of Care (Excepted Services) (Scotland) Regulations 2002 Partial Revocation Regulations 2005 (S.S.I. 2005/96)
- Regulation of Care (Fees) (Scotland) Order 2005 (S.S.I. 2005/97)
- Regulation of Care (Scotland) Act 2001 (Transitional Provisions) Order 2005 (S.S.I. 2005/98)
- Diseases of Animals (Approved Disinfectants) Amendment (Scotland) Order 2005 (S.S.I. 2005/99)
- Births, Deaths, Marriages and Divorces (Fees) (Scotland) Amendment Regulations 2005 (S.S.I. 2005/100)

== 101-200 ==
- Pollution Prevention and Control (Scotland) Amendment Regulations 2005 (S.S.I. 2005/101)
- Representation of the People (Variation of Limits of Candidates' Local Government Election Expenses) (Scotland) Order 2005 (S.S.I. 2005/102)
- Non Domestic Rating (Rural Areas and Rateable Value Limits) (Scotland) Order 2005 (S.S.I. 2005/103)
- Non-Domestic Rating (Former Agricultural Premises) (Scotland) Order 2005 (S.S.I. 2005/104)
- Valuation (Stud Farms) (Scotland) Order 2005 (S.S.I. 2005/105)
- Antisocial Behaviour (Fixed Penalty Offence) (Prescribed Area) (Scotland) Regulations 2005 (S.S.I. 2005/106)
- Police Grant (Scotland) Order 2005 (S.S.I. 2005/107)
- Health Boards (Membership and Procedure) (Scotland) Amendment Regulations 2005 (S.S.I. 2005/108)
- Pesticides (Maximum Residue Levels in Crops, Food and Feeding Stuffs) (Scotland) Amendment Regulations 2005 (S.S.I. 2005/109)
- Antisocial Behaviour (Amount of Fixed Penalty) (Scotland) Order 2005 (S.S.I. 2005/110)
- Advice and Assistance (Scotland) Amendment Regulations 2005 (S.S.I. 2005/111)
- Civil Legal Aid (Scotland) Amendment Regulations 2005 (S.S.I. 2005/112)
- Criminal Legal Aid (Scotland) (Fees) Amendment Regulations 2005 (S.S.I. 2005/113)
- Community Care (Direct Payments) (Scotland) Amendment Regulations 2005 (S.S.I. 2005/114)
- NHS Quality Improvement Scotland (Amendment) Order 2005 (S.S.I. 2005/115)
- Feeding Stuffs (Establishments and Intermediaries) Amendment (Scotland) Regulations 2005 (S.S.I. 2005/116)
- Agricultural Subsidies (Appeals) (Scotland) Amendment Regulations 2005 (S.S.I. 2005/117)
- National Health Service (Service Committees and Tribunal) (Scotland) Amendment Regulations 2005 (S.S.I. 2005/118)
- National Health Service (Optical Charges and Payments) (Scotland) Amendment Regulations 2005 (S.S.I. 2005/119)
- NHS Quality Improvement Scotland (Establishment of the Scottish Health Council) Regulations 2005 (S.S.I. 2005/120)
- National Health Service (Dental Charges) (Scotland) Amendment Regulations 2005 (S.S.I. 2005/121)
- Dissolution of Local Health Councils (Scotland) Order 2005 (S.S.I. 2005/122)
- Road Traffic (NHS Charges) Amendment (Scotland) Regulations 2005 (S.S.I. 2005/123)
- National Health Service (Charges for Drugs and Appliances) (Scotland) Amendment Regulations 2005 (S.S.I. 2005/124)
- Gender Recognition (Disclosure of Information) (Scotland) Order 2005 (S.S.I. 2005/125)
- Non-Domestic Rates (Levying) (Scotland) Regulations 2005 (S.S.I. 2005/126)
- Non-Domestic Rating (Valuation of Utilities) (Scotland) Order 2005 (S.S.I. 2005/127)
- National Health Service (General Ophthalmic Services) (Scotland) Amendment Regulations 2005 (S.S.I. 2005/128)
- Intensive Support and Monitoring (Scotland) Regulations 2005 (S.S.I. 2005/129)
- Antisocial Behaviour (Fixed Penalty Notice) (Additional Information) (Scotland) Order 2005 (S.S.I. 2005/130)
- Ullapool Harbour Revision (Constitution) Order 2005 (S.S.I. 2005/132)
- Scrabster Harbour Revision (Constitution) Order 2005 (S.S.I. 2005/133)
- Act of Sederunt (Rules of the Court of Session Amendment) (Jurisdiction, Recognition and Enforcement of Judgments) 2005 (S.S.I. 2005/135)
- Food Protection (Emergency Prohibitions) (Amnesic Shellfish Poisoning) (West Coast) (No. 12) (Scotland) Order 2004 Revocation Order 2005 (S.S.I. 2005/136)
- Food Protection (Emergency Prohibitions) (Amnesic Shellfish Poisoning) (West Coast) (Scotland) Revocation Order 2005 (S.S.I. 2005/137)
- Inshore Fishing (Prohibition of Fishing for Cockles) (Scotland) Amendment Order 2005 (S.S.I. 2005/140)
- Remote Monitoring Requirements (Prescribed Courts) (Scotland) Regulations 2005 (S.S.I. 2005/141)
- Bail Conditions (Specification of Devices) and Restriction of Liberty Order (Scotland) Amendment Regulations 2005 (S.S.I. 2005/142)
- Common Agricultural Policy Single Farm Payment and Support Schemes (Scotland) Regulations 2005 (S.S.I. 2005/143)
- Home Energy Efficiency Scheme Amendment (Scotland) Regulations 2005 (S.S.I. 2005/144)
- Act of Sederunt (Rules of the Court of Session Amendment No. 2) (Fees of Solicitors) 2005 (S.S.I. 2005/147)
- Act of Sederunt (Rules of the Court of Session Amendment No.3) (Fees of Shorthand Writers) 2005 (S.S.I. 2005/148)
- Act of Sederunt (Fees of Solicitors and Witnesses in the Sheriff Court) (Amendment) 2005 (S.S.I. 2005/149)
- Act of Sederunt (Fees of Shorthand Writers in the Sheriff Court) (Amendment) 2005 (S.S.I. 2005/150)
- Gender Recognition (Prescription of Particulars to be Registered) (Scotland) Regulations 2005 (S.S.I. 2005/151)
- Pensions Appeal Tribunals (Scotland) (Amendment) Rules 2005 (S.S.I. 2005/152)
- Act of Sederunt (Rules of the Court of Session Amendment No. 4) (Prevention of Terrorism Act 2005) 2005 (S.S.I. 2005/153)
- Education (Additional Support for Learning) (Scotland) Act 2004 (Commencement No. 1) Order 2005 (S.S.I. 2005/154)
- Additional Support Needs Tribunals for Scotland (Appointment of President, Conveners and Members and Disqualification) Regulations 2005 (S.S.I. 2005/155)
- Sexual Offences Act 2003 (Prescribed Police Stations) (Scotland) Amendment (No. 2) Regulations 2005 (S.S.I. 2005/156)
- Landfill Allowances Scheme (Scotland) Regulations 2005 (S.S.I. 2005/157)
- Act of Adjournal (Criminal Procedure Rules Amendment No. 2) (Miscellaneous) 2005 (S.S.I. 2005/160)
- Mental Health (Care and Treatment) (Scotland) Act 2003 (Commencement No. 4) Order 2005 (S.S.I. 2005/161)
- Civil Legal Aid (Financial Conditions) (Scotland) Regulations 2005 (S.S.I. 2005/162)
- Advice and Assistance (Financial Conditions) (Scotland) Regulations 2005 (S.S.I. 2005/163)
- Budget (Scotland) Act 2004 Amendment Order 2005 (S.S.I. 2005/164)
- Advice and Assistance (Assistance by Way of Representation) (Scotland) Amendment Regulations 2005 (S.S.I. 2005/165)
- Housing Support Grant (Scotland) Order 2005 (S.S.I. 2005/166)
- Invergarry-Kyle of Lochalsh Trunk Road (A87) Extension (Skye Bridge Crossing) Toll Order (Revocation) Order 2005 (S.S.I. 2005/167)
- Vulnerable Witnesses (Scotland) Act 2004 (Commencement) Order 2005 (S.S.I. 2005/168)
- Advice and Assistance (Scotland) Amendment (No. 2) Regulations 2005 (S.S.I. 2005/171)
- Building (Forms) (Scotland) Regulations 2005 (S.S.I. 2005/172)
- TSE (Scotland) Amendment Regulations 2005 (S.S.I. 2005/173)
- Salmon and Freshwater Fisheries (Consolidation) (Scotland) Act 2003 (Commencement) Order 2005 (S.S.I. 2005/174)
- Mental Health (Fee Payable to Designated Medical Practitioners) (Scotland) Regulations 2005 (S.S.I. 2005/175)
- Mental Welfare Commission for Scotland (Prescribed Persons) Regulations 2005 (S.S.I. 2005/176)
- Food Protection (Emergency Prohibitions) (Amnesic Shellfish Poisoning) (West Coast) (No. 7) (Scotland) Order 2004 Partial Revocation (No. 2) Order 2005 (S.S.I. 2005/177)
- Non-Domestic Rating (Valuation of Utilities) (Scotland) Revocation Order 2005 (S.S.I. 2005/178)
- National Health Service (Travelling Expenses and Remission of Charges) (Scotland) Amendment (No. 2) Regulations 2005 (S.S.I. 2005/179)
- Renewables Obligation (Scotland) Order 2005 (S.S.I. 2005/185)
- Act of Adjournal (Criminal Procedure Rules Amendment No. 3) (Vulnerable Witnesses (Scotland) Act 2004) 2005 (S.S.I. 2005/188)
- Act of Sederunt (Ordinary Cause Rules) Amendment (Gender Recognition Act 2004) 2005 (S.S.I. 2005/189)
- Act of Sederunt (Child Care and Maintenance Rules) Amendment (Vulnerable Witnesses (Scotland) Act 2004) 2005 (S.S.I. 2005/190)
- Food Protection (Emergency Prohibitions) (Amnesic Shellfish Poisoning) (West Coast) (No. 9) (Scotland) Order 2004 Partial Revocation Order 2005 (S.S.I. 2005/191)
- Act of Sederunt (Rules of the Court of Session Amendment No. 5) (Miscellaneous) 2005 (S.S.I. 2005/193)
- Act of Sederunt (Rules of the Court of Session Amendment No. 6) (Asylum and Immigration (Treatment of Claimants, etc.) Act 2004) 2005 (S.S.I. 2005/198)
- Act of Sederunt (Messengers-at-Arms and Sheriff Officers Rules Amendment) (Caution and Insurance) 2005 (S.S.I. 2005/199)
- Police Pensions Amendment (Scotland) Regulations 2005 (S.S.I. 2005/200)

== 201-300 ==
- Intensive Support and Monitoring (Scotland) Amendment Regulations 2005 (S.S.I. 2005/201)
- Food Protection (Emergency Prohibitions) (Amnesic Shellfish Poisoning) (West Coast) (No. 13) (Scotland) Order 2004 Revocation Order 2005 (S.S.I. 2005/202)
- Food Protection (Emergency Prohibitions) (Amnesic Shellfish Poisoning) (West Coast) (No. 5) (Scotland) Order 2004 Partial Revocation Order 2005 (S.S.I. 2005/203)
- Food Protection (Emergency Prohibitions) (Amnesic Shellfish Poisoning) (West Coast) (No. 10) (Scotland) Order 2004 Revocation Order 2005 (S.S.I. 2005/204)
- Mental Welfare Commission for Scotland (Authorised Persons) Regulations 2005 (S.S.I. 2005/205)
- Mental Health (Provision of Information to Patients) (Prescribed Times) (Scotland) Regulations 2005 (S.S.I. 2005/206)
- Fire (Scotland) Act 2005 (Commencement No. 1) Order 2005 (S.S.I. 2005/207)
- Food Protection (Emergency Prohibitions) (Amnesic Shellfish Poisoning) (West Coast) (No. 3) (Scotland) Order 2005 (S.S.I. 2005/208)
- Food Protection (Emergency Prohibitions) (Amnesic Shellfish Poisoning) (West Coast) (No. 6) (Scotland) Order 2004 Revocation Order 2005 (S.S.I. 2005/210)
- Food Protection (Emergency Prohibitions) (Amnesic Shellfish Poisoning) (West Coast) (No. 5) (Scotland) Order 2004 Revocation Order 2005 (S.S.I. 2005/212)
- Food Protection (Emergency Prohibitions) (Amnesic Shellfish Poisoning) (West Coast) (No. 3) (Scotland) Order 2004 Revocation Order 2005 (S.S.I. 2005/213)
- Miscellaneous Food Additives Amendment (Scotland) Regulations 2005 (S.S.I. 2005/214)
- Smoke Flavourings (Scotland) Regulations 2005 (S.S.I. 2005/215)
- Plant Health (Import Inspection Fees) (Scotland) Regulations 2005 (S.S.I. 2005/216)
- Education (Student Fees and Support) Temporary Protection (Scotland) Amendment Regulations 2005 (S.S.I. 2005/217)
- Production of Bovine Collagen Intended for Human Consumption in the United Kingdom (Scotland) Regulations 2005 (S.S.I. 2005/218)
- Farm Business Development (Scotland) Variation Scheme 2005 (S.S.I. 2005/219)
- Food Protection (Emergency Prohibitions) (Amnesic Shellfish Poisoning) (West Coast) (No. 9) (Scotland) Order 2004 Partial Revocation (No. 2) Order 2005 (S.S.I. 2005/220)
- Food Protection (Emergency Prohibitions) (Amnesic Shellfish Poisoning) (West Coast) (No. 7) (Scotland) Order 2004 Revocation Order 2005 (S.S.I. 2005/221)
- Food Labelling Amendment (Scotland) Regulations 2005 (S.S.I. 2005/222)
- Horse Passports (Scotland) Regulations 2005 (S.S.I. 2005/223)
- Land Management Contracts (Menu Scheme) (Scotland) Regulations 2005 (S.S.I. 2005/225)
- Food Protection (Emergency Prohibitions) (Amnesic Shellfish Poisoning) (West Coast) (No. 2) (Scotland) Revocation Order 2005 (S.S.I. 2005/227)
- Food Protection (Emergency Prohibitions) (Amnesic Shellfish Poisoning) (West Coast) (No. 11) (Scotland) Order 2004 Revocation Order 2005 (S.S.I. 2005/228)
- Emergency Workers (Scotland) Act 2005 (Commencement) Order 2005 (S.S.I. 2005/229)
- Water Environment and Water Services (Scotland) Act 2003 (Commencement No. 2) Order 2005 (S.S.I. 2005/235)
- Materials and Articles in Contact with Food (Scotland) Regulations 2005 (S.S.I. 2005/243)
- Fireworks (Scotland) Amendment Regulations 2005 (S.S.I. 2005/245)
- Feed (Corn Gluten Feed and Brewers Grains) (Emergency Control) (Scotland) Regulations 2005 (S.S.I. 2005/246)
- Confirmation to Small Estates (Scotland) Order 2005 (S.S.I. 2005/251)
- Prior Rights of Surviving Spouse (Scotland) Order 2005 (S.S.I. 2005/252)
- Water Environment and Water Services (Scotland) Act 2003 (Commencement No. 3) Order 2005 (S.S.I. 2005/256)
- Common Agricultural Policy Single Farm Payment and Support Schemes (Scotland) Amendment Regulations 2005 (S.S.I. 2005/257)
- Food Protection (Emergency Prohibitions) (Amnesic Shellfish Poisoning) (West Coast) (No. 4) (Scotland) Order 2005 (S.S.I. 2005/260)
- Mental Welfare Commission for Scotland (Appointment of Medical Commissioners) Regulations 2005 (S.S.I. 2005/261)
- Mental Health (Conflict of Interest) (Scotland) Regulations 2005 (S.S.I. 2005/262)
- Education (Additional Support for Learning) (Scotland) Act 2004 (Commencement No. 2) Order 2005 (S.S.I. 2005/263)
- Additional Support for Learning (Appropriate Agency Request Period and Exceptions) (Scotland) Regulations 2005 (S.S.I. 2005/264)
- Additional Support for Learning (Changes in School Education) (Scotland) Regulations 2005 (S.S.I. 2005/265)
- Additional Support for Learning (Co-ordinated Support Plan) (Scotland) Regulations 2005 (S.S.I. 2005/266)
- Additional Support for Learning (Publication of Information) (Scotland) Regulations 2005 (S.S.I. 2005/267)
- Act of Sederunt (Rules of the Court of Session Amendment No. 7) (Miscellaneous) 2005 (S.S.I. 2005/268)
- St Mary's Music School (Aided Places) (Scotland) Amendment Regulations 2005 (S.S.I. 2005/269)
- Education (Assisted Places) (Scotland) Amendment Regulations 2005 (S.S.I. 2005/270)
- Producer Responsibility Obligations (Packaging Waste) Amendment (Scotland) Regulations 2005 (S.S.I. 2005/271)
- Food Protection (Emergency Prohibitions) (Amnesic Shellfish Poisoning) (West Coast) (No. 3) (Scotland) Revocation Order 2005 (S.S.I. 2005/272)
- Food Protection (Emergency Prohibitions) (Amnesic Shellfish Poisoning) (West Coast) (No. 8) (Scotland) Order 2004 Revocation Order 2005 (S.S.I. 2005/273)
- Food Protection (Emergency Prohibitions) (Amnesic Shellfish Poisoning) (West Coast) (No. 9) (Scotland) Order 2004 Revocation Order 2005 (S.S.I. 2005/274)
- Right to Purchase (Prescribed Persons) (Scotland) Amendment Order 2005 (S.S.I. 2005/275)
- Wick Harbour Revision (Constitution) Order 2005 (S.S.I. 2005/276)
- Contaminants in Food (Scotland) Amendment Regulations 2005 (S.S.I. 2005/277)
- Animals and Animal Products (Import and Export) (Scotland) Amendment Regulations 2005 (S.S.I. 2005/278)
- Seed Potatoes (Fees) (Scotland) Regulations 2005 (S.S.I. 2005/279)
- Seed Potatoes (Scotland) Amendment Regulations 2005 (S.S.I. 2005/280)
- Pesticides (Maximum Residue Levels in Crops, Food and Feeding Stuffs) (Scotland) Amendment (No. 2) Regulations 2005 (S.S.I. 2005/281)
- Registration of Fish Sellers and Buyers and Designation of Auction Sites (Scotland) Regulations 2005 (S.S.I. 2005/286)
- Mental Health (Medical treatment subject to safeguards) (Section 234) (Scotland) Regulations 2005 (S.S.I. 2005/291)
- Mental Health (Medical treatment subject to safeguards) (Section 237) (Scotland) Regulations 2005 (S.S.I. 2005/292)
- Local Government Pension Scheme (Scotland) Amendment Regulations 2005 (S.S.I. 2005/293)
- Food (Chilli, Chilli Products, Curcuma and Palm Oil) (Emergency Control) (Scotland) Regulations 2005 (S.S.I. 2005/294)
- Electricity (Applications for Consent) Amendment (Scotland) Regulations 2005 (S.S.I. 2005/295)
- Adam Smith College, Fife (Establishment) Order 2005 (S.S.I. 2005/298)
- Road Traffic (Temporary Restrictions) Procedure Amendment (Scotland) Regulations 2005 (S.S.I. 2005/299)
- Air Quality Limit Values (Scotland) Amendment Regulations 2005 (S.S.I. 2005/300)

== 301-400 ==
- Loch Crinan Scallops Several Fishery Order 2005 (S.S.I. 2005/304)
- Nitrate (Public Participation etc.) (Scotland) Regulations 2005 (S.S.I. 2005/305)
- Charities (Designated Religious Bodies) (Scotland) Order 2005 (S.S.I. 2005/306)
- Honey (Scotland) Amendment Regulations 2005 (S.S.I. 2005/307)
- Wildlife and Countryside Act 1981 (Variation of Schedule) (Scotland) Order 2005 (S.S.I. 2005/308)
- Mental Health (Content and amendment of care plans) (Scotland) Regulations 2005 (S.S.I. 2005/309)
- Mental Health (Social Circumstances Reports) (Scotland) Regulations 2005 (S.S.I. 2005/310)
- Sea Fishing (Enforcement of Community Quota and Third Country Fishing Measures) (Scotland) Order 2005 (S.S.I. 2005/311)
- Mental Health (Content and amendment of Part 9 care plans) (Scotland) Regulations 2005 (S.S.I. 2005/312)
- Edinburgh College of Art (Scotland) Order of Council 1995 (Amendment) Order of Council 2005 (S.S.I. 2005/313)
- Student Loans (Information Requests, Maximum Threshold, Maximum Repayment Levels and Hardship Loans) (Scotland) Regulations 2005 (S.S.I. 2005/314)
- Local Government Pension Scheme (Scotland) Amendment (No. 2) Regulations 2005 (S.S.I. 2005/315)
- Genetically Modified Organisms (Transboundary Movements) (Scotland) Regulations 2005 (S.S.I. 2005/316)
- Falkirk College of Further and Higher Education (Change of Name) Order 2005 (S.S.I. 2005/317)
- Regulation of Care (Social Service Workers) (Scotland) Order 2005 (S.S.I. 2005/318)
- Gaming Act (Variation of Fees) (Scotland) Order 2005 (S.S.I. 2005/319)
- Non-Domestic Rating (Valuation of Utilities) (Scotland) Amendment Order 2005 (S.S.I. 2005/320)
- False Monetary Instruments (Scotland) Order 2005 (S.S.I. 2005/321)
- Housing (Scotland) Act 2001 (Payments out of Grants for Housing Support Services) Amendment Order 2005 (S.S.I. 2005/322)
- Products of Animal Origin (Third Country Imports) (Scotland) Amendment Regulations 2005 (S.S.I. 2005/323)
- Financial Assistance for Environmental Purposes (Scotland) Order 2005 (S.S.I. 2005/324)
- Additional Support for Learning (Appropriate Agencies) (Scotland) Order 2005 (S.S.I. 2005/325)
- National Health Service (Charges for Drugs and Appliances) (Scotland) Amendment (No. 2) Regulations 2005 (S.S.I. 2005/326)
- National Health Service (Pharmaceutical Services) (Scotland) Amendment Regulations 2005 (S.S.I. 2005/327)
- Cereal Seed (Scotland) Regulations 2005 (S.S.I. 2005/328)
- Fodder Plant Seed (Scotland) Regulations 2005 (S.S.I. 2005/329)
- Prevention and Monitoring of Cetacean Bycatch (Scotland) Order 2005 (S.S.I. 2005/330)
- Plant Protection Products (Scotland) Regulations 2005 (S.S.I. 2005/331)
- Eggs (Marketing Standards) (Enforcement) (Scotland) Regulations 2005 (S.S.I. 2005/332)
- National Health Service (Primary Medical Services Performers Lists) (Scotland) Amendment Regulations 2005 (S.S.I. 2005/333)
- National Health Service (Service Committees and Tribunal) (Scotland) Amendment (No. 2) Regulations 2005 (S.S.I. 2005/334)
- National Health Service (Tribunal) (Scotland) Amendment Regulations 2005 (S.S.I. 2005/335)
- National Health Service (Primary Medical Services Section 17C Agreements) (Scotland) Amendment Regulations 2005 (S.S.I. 2005/336)
- National Health Service (General Medical Services Contracts) (Scotland) Amendment Regulations 2005 (S.S.I. 2005/337)
- Local Authorities' Traffic Orders (Procedure) (Scotland) Amendment Regulations 2005 (S.S.I. 2005/338)
- Advice and Assistance (Scotland) Amendment (No. 3) Regulations 2005 (S.S.I. 2005/339)
- Pollution Prevention and Control (Scotland) Amendment (No. 2) Regulations 2005 (S.S.I. 2005/340)
- Education (Graduate Endowment, Student Fees and Support) (Scotland) Amendment Regulations 2005 (S.S.I. 2005/341)
- Fire (Additional Function) (Scotland) Order 2005 (S.S.I. 2005/342)
- Fire (Charging) (Scotland) Order 2005 (S.S.I. 2005/343)
- Fire (Scotland) Act 2005 (Consequential Modifications and Amendments) (No. 2) Order 2005 (S.S.I. 2005/344)
- Education (Student Loans) Amendment (Scotland) Regulations 2005 (S.S.I. 2005/345)
- Public Service Vehicles (Registration of Local Services) (Scotland) Amendment Regulations 2005 (S.S.I. 2005/346)
- Water Environment (Controlled Activities) (Scotland) Regulations 2005 (S.S.I. 2005/348)
- Water Services etc. (Scotland) Act 2005 (Commencement No. 1 and Savings) Order 2005 (S.S.I. 2005/351)
- Fire (Scotland) Act 2005 (Relevant Premises) Regulations 2005 (S.S.I. 2005/352)
- Caledonian MacBrayne Limited (Kennacraig) Harbour Empowerment Order 2005 (S.S.I. 2005/353)
- Education (Listed Bodies) (Scotland) Amendment Order 2005 (S.S.I. 2005/354)
- Requirements for Teachers (Scotland) Regulations 2005 (S.S.I. 2005/355)
- Serious Organised Crime and Police Act 2005 (Commencement No. 1) (Scotland) Order 2005 (S.S.I. 2005/358)
- Caledonian MacBrayne (Oban Quay) Harbour Revision Order 2005 (S.S.I. 2005/359)
- Food Protection (Emergency Prohibitions) (Amnesic Shellfish Poisoning) (West Coast) (No. 4) (Scotland) Revocation Order 2005 (S.S.I. 2005/360)
- Criminal Justice (Scotland) Act 2003 (Amendment of Police (Scotland) Act 1967) Order 2005 (S.S.I. 2005/361)
- Mental Health (Compulsion orders – documents and reports to be submitted to the Tribunal) (Scotland) Regulations 2005 (S.S.I. 2005/365)
- Mental Health (Compulsory treatment orders – documents and reports to be submitted to the Tribunal) (Scotland) Regulations 2005 (S.S.I. 2005/366)
- Regulation of Scallop Dredges (Scotland) Order 2005 (S.S.I. 2005/371)
- Mental Health (Care and Treatment) (Scotland) Act 2003 (Commencement No. 4) Amendment Order 2005 (S.S.I. 2005/375)
- Food Protection (Emergency Prohibitions) (Amnesic Shellfish Poisoning) (West Coast) (No. 5) (Scotland) Order 2005 (S.S.I. 2005/379)
- Mental Health (Conflict of Interest) (Scotland) (No. 2) Regulations 2005 (S.S.I. 2005/380)
- Mental Health (Removal Order) (Scotland) Regulations 2005 (S.S.I. 2005/381)
- Act of Sederunt (Registration Appeal Court) (No. 2) 2005 (S.S.I. 2005/382)
- Fire (Scotland) Act 2005 (Consequential Modifications and Amendments) Order 2005 (S.S.I. 2005/383)
- Food Protection (Emergency Prohibitions) (Amnesic Shellfish Poisoning) (West Coast) (No. 6) (Scotland) Order 2005 (S.S.I. 2005/384)
- Food Protection (Emergency Prohibitions) (Amnesic Shellfish Poisoning) (West Coast) (No. 7) (Scotland) Order 2005 (S.S.I. 2005/391)
- Fire (Scotland) Act 2005 (Commencement No. 2) Order 2005 (S.S.I. 2005/392)
- Teachers' Superannuation (Scotland) Regulations 2005 (S.S.I. 2005/393)

== 401-500 ==
- Mental Health (Safeguards for Certain Informal Patients) (Scotland) Regulations 2005 (S.S.I. 2005/401)
- Food Protection (Emergency Prohibitions) (Amnesic Shellfish Poisoning) (West Coast) (No. 5) (Scotland) Revocation Order 2005 (S.S.I. 2005/406)
- Mental Health (Specified Persons' Correspondence) (Scotland) Regulations 2005 (S.S.I. 2005/408)
- Food Protection (Emergency Prohibitions) (Amnesic Shellfish Poisoning) (West Coast) (No. 8) (Scotland) Order 2005 (S.S.I. 2005/410)
- Mental Welfare Commission for Scotland (Procedure and Delegation of Functions) Regulations 2005 (S.S.I. 2005/411)
- Mental Health (Fee Payable to Designated Medical Practitioners) (Scotland) (No. 2) Regulations 2005 (S.S.I. 2005/412)
- Food Protection (Emergency Prohibitions) (Paralytic Shellfish Poisoning) (East Coast) (Scotland) Order 2005 (S.S.I. 2005/415)
- Mental Health (Period for Appeal) Regulations 2005 (S.S.I. 2005/416)
- Mental Health (Care and Treatment) (Scotland) Act 2003 (Code of Practice) Order 2005 (S.S.I. 2005/417)
- Further and Higher Education (Scotland) Act 2005 (Commencement) Order 2005 (S.S.I. 2005/419)
- Mental Health Tribunal for Scotland (Practice and Procedure) Rules 2005 (S.S.I. 2005/420)
- Food Protection (Emergency Prohibitions) (Amnesic Shellfish Poisoning) (West Coast) (No. 9) (Scotland) Order 2005 (S.S.I. 2005/421)
- Regulation of Care (Scotland) Act 2001 (Commencement No. 6) Order 2005 (S.S.I. 2005/426)
- Civil Partnership Act 2004 (Commencement No. 1) (Scotland) Order 2005 (S.S.I. 2005/428)
- Food Protection (Emergency Prohibitions) (Amnesic Shellfish Poisoning) (West Coast) (No. 10) (Scotland) Order 2005 (S.S.I. 2005/431)
- Regulation of Care (Prescribed Registers) (Scotland) Order 2005 (S.S.I. 2005/432)
- Criminal Justice (Scotland) Act 2003 (Commencement No. 6) Order 2005 (S.S.I. 2005/433)
- Tuberculosis (Scotland) Order 2005 (S.S.I. 2005/434)
- Food Safety (General Food Hygiene) Amendment (Scotland) Regulations 2005 (S.S.I. 2005/435)
- Dissolution of Funding Councils (Scotland) Order 2005 (S.S.I. 2005/437)
- Registration of Fish Sellers and Buyers and Designation of Auction Sites (Scotland) Amendment Regulations 2005 (S.S.I. 2005/438)
- Housing (Scotland) Act 2001 (Transfer of Scottish Homes Property and Liabilities) Order 2005 (S.S.I. 2005/439)
- Mental Health (Period for Appeal) (Scotland) (No. 2) Regulations 2005 (S.S.I. 2005/441)
- Mental Welfare Commission for Scotland (Procedure and Delegation of Functions) (No. 2) Regulations 2005 (S.S.I. 2005/442)
- Mental Health (Certificates for Medical Treatment) (Scotland) Regulations 2005 (S.S.I. 2005/443)
- Mental Health (Form of Documents) (Scotland) Regulations 2005 (S.S.I. 2005/444)
- Mental Health (Care and Treatment) (Scotland) Act 2003 (Modification of Subordinate Legislation) Order 2005 (S.S.I. 2005/445)
- Mental Health (Class of Nurse) (Scotland) Regulations 2005 (S.S.I. 2005/446)
- Mental Health (Class of Nurse) (Scotland) Revocation Order 2005 (S.S.I. 2005/447)
- Civil Legal Aid (Scotland) Amendment (No. 2) Regulations 2005 (S.S.I. 2005/448)
- Civil Legal Aid (Scotland) (Fees) Amendment Regulations 2005 (S.S.I. 2005/449)
- Criminal Legal Aid (Scotland) Amendment Regulations 2005 (S.S.I. 2005/450)
- Legal Aid in Contempt of Court Proceedings (Scotland) Amendment Regulations 2005 (S.S.I. 2005/451)
- Mental Health (Care and Treatment) (Scotland) Act 2003 (Transitional and Savings Provisions) Order 2005 (S.S.I. 2005/452)
- Fire and Rescue Services (Framework) (Scotland) Order 2005 (S.S.I. 2005/453)
- Transport (Scotland) Act 2005 (Commencement No. 1) Order 2005 (S.S.I. 2005/454)
- Food Protection (Emergency Prohibitions) (Amnesic Shellfish Poisoning) (West Coast) (No. 11) (Scotland) Order 2005 (S.S.I. 2005/455)
- Food Labelling Amendment (No. 2) (Scotland) Regulations 2005 (S.S.I. 2005/456)
- Act of Adjournal (Criminal Procedure Rules Amendment No. 4) (Mental Health (Care and Treatment) (Scotland) Act 2003) 2005 (S.S.I. 2005/457)
- Registration of Civil Partnerships (Prescription of Forms, Publicisation and Errors) (Scotland) Regulations 2005 (S.S.I. 2005/458)
- Mental Health (Care and Treatment) (Scotland) Act 2003 (Commencement No. 4) Amendment (No. 2) Order 2005 (S.S.I. 2005/459)
- Plant Breeders' Rights (Discontinuation of Prior Use Exemption) (Scotland) Order 2005 (S.S.I. 2005/460)
- Pollution Prevention and Control (Designation of Public Participation Directive) (Scotland) Order 2005 (S.S.I. 2005/461)
- Mental Health (Absconding by mentally disordered offenders) (Scotland) Regulations 2005 (S.S.I. 2005/463)
- Mental Health (Safety and Security) (Scotland) Regulations 2005 (S.S.I. 2005/464)
- Mental Health (Care and Treatment) (Scotland) Act 2003 (Modification of Enactments) Order 2005 (S.S.I. 2005/465)
- Mental Health (Definition of Specified Person: Correspondence) (Scotland) Regulations 2005 (S.S.I. 2005/466)
- Mental Health (Cross border transfer: patients subject to detention requirement or otherwise in hospital) (Scotland) Regulations 2005 (S.S.I. 2005/467)
- Mental Health (Use of Telephones) (Scotland) Regulations 2005 (S.S.I. 2005/468)
- TSE (Scotland) Amendment (No. 2) Regulations 2005 (S.S.I. 2005/469)
- Bovine Products (Restriction on Placing on the Market) (Scotland) Regulations 2005 (S.S.I. 2005/470)
- Act of Adjournal (Criminal Procedure Rules Amendment No. 5) (Sexual Offences Prevention Orders) 2005 (S.S.I. 2005/472)
- Act of Sederunt (Summary Applications, Statutory Applications and Appeals etc. Rules) Amendment (Protection of Children and Prevention of Sexual Offences (Scotland) Act 2005) 2005 (S.S.I. 2005/473)
- Tryptophan in Food (Scotland) Regulations 2005 (S.S.I. 2005/479)
- Protection of Children and Prevention of Sexual Offences (Scotland) Act 2005 (Commencement and Savings) Order 2005 (S.S.I. 2005/480)
- Advice and Assistance (Assistance by Way of Representation) (Scotland) Amendment (No. 2) Regulations 2005 (S.S.I. 2005/482)
- Criminal Justice Act 1988 (Offensive Weapons) (Scotland) Order 2005 (S.S.I. 2005/483)
- Reporting of Prices of Milk Products (Scotland) Regulations 2005 (S.S.I. 2005/484)
- River Awe Salmon Fishery District (Baits and Lures) Revocation Regulations 2005 (S.S.I. 2005/485)
- Removal, Storage and Disposal of Vehicles (Prescribed Sums and Charges etc.) Amendment (Scotland) Regulations 2005 (S.S.I. 2005/486)
- Argyll Salmon Fishery District Designation Order 2005 (S.S.I. 2005/487)
- Housing Grants (Assessment of Contributions) (Scotland) Amendment Regulations 2005 (S.S.I. 2005/488)
- Inverness Harbour Revision (Works) Order 2005 (S.S.I. 2005/489)
- Peterhead Port Authority Harbour (Constitution) Revision Order 2005 (S.S.I. 2005/491)
- Smoking, Health and Social Care (Scotland) Act 2005 (Commencement No. 1) Order 2005 (S.S.I. 2005/492)
- Civil Contingencies Act 2004 (Commencement) (Scotland) Order 2005 (S.S.I. 2005/493)
- Civil Contingencies Act 2004 (Contingency Planning) (Scotland) Regulations 2005 (S.S.I. 2005/494)
- Police Pensions (Part-time Service) Amendment (Scotland) Regulations 2005 (S.S.I. 2005/495)
- Salmonella in Broiler Flocks (Sampling Powers) (Scotland) Regulations 2005 (S.S.I. 2005/496)
- Food Protection (Emergency Prohibitions) (Amnesic Shellfish Poisoning) (West Coast) (No. 12) (Scotland) Order 2005 (S.S.I. 2005/497)
- Food Protection (Emergency Prohibitions) (Amnesic Shellfish Poisoning) (East Coast) (Scotland) Order 2005 (S.S.I. 2005/498)
- Food Protection (Emergency Prohibitions) (Paralytic Shellfish Poisoning) (East Coast) (Scotland) Revocation Order 2005 (S.S.I. 2005/499)

== 501-600 ==
- Additional Support for Learning Dispute Resolution (Scotland) Regulations 2005 (S.S.I. 2005/501)
- Animals and Animal Products (Import and Export) (Scotland) Amendment (No. 2) Regulations 2005 (S.S.I. 2005/502)
- Act of Sederunt (Summary Applications, Statutory Applications and Appeals etc. Rules) Amendment (Mental Health (Care and Treatment) (Scotland) Act 2003) 2005 (S.S.I. 2005/504)
- Food Hygiene (Scotland) Regulations 2005 (S.S.I. 2005/505)
- Food Protection (Emergency Prohibitions) (Paralytic Shellfish Poisoning) (Orkney) (Scotland) Order 2005 (S.S.I. 2005/506)
- Scottish Water (Allt Beithe) Water Order 2005 (S.S.I. 2005/508)
- Scottish Water (Loch a'Bhaid Luachraich) Water Order 2005 (S.S.I. 2005/509)
- Pollution Prevention and Control (Public Participation etc.) (Scotland) Regulations 2005 (S.S.I. 2005/510)
- National Health Service (Superannuation Scheme, Injury Benefits and Compensation for Premature Retirement) (Scotland) Amendment Regulations 2005 (S.S.I. 2005/512)
- Scottish Water (Abhainn Chro Bheinn) Water Order 2005 (S.S.I. 2005/513)
- Additional Support Needs Tribunals for Scotland (Practice and Procedure) Rules 2005 (S.S.I. 2005/514)
- Additional Support for Learning (Placing Requests and Deemed Decisions) (Scotland) Regulations 2005 (S.S.I. 2005/515)
- Education (Additional Support for Learning) (Scotland) Act 2004 (Transitional and Savings Provisions) Order 2005 (S.S.I. 2005/516)
- Education (Additional Support for Learning) (Scotland) Act 2004 (Consequential Modifications of Subordinate Legislation) Order 2005 (S.S.I. 2005/517)
- Additional Support for Learning (Co-ordinated Support Plan) (Scotland) Amendment Regulations 2005 (S.S.I. 2005/518)
- Mental Health Tribunal for Scotland (Practice and Procedure) (No. 2) Rules 2005 (S.S.I. 2005/519)
- Food Protection (Emergency Prohibitions) (Amnesic Shellfish Poisoning) (West Coast) (No. 13) (Scotland) Order 2005 (S.S.I. 2005/520)
- Act of Sederunt (Rules of the Court of Session Amendment No. 8) (Miscellaneous) 2005 (S.S.I. 2005/521)
- National Assistance (Assessment of Resources) Amendment (No. 2) (Scotland) Regulations 2005 (S.S.I. 2005/522)
- Act of Sederunt (Sheriff Court European Enforcement Order Rules) 2005 (S.S.I. 2005/523)
- Glasgow School of Art (Scotland) Amendment Order of Council 2005 (S.S.I. 2005/525)
- Victim Statements (Prescribed Offences) (Scotland) Revocation Order 2005 (S.S.I. 2005/526)
- Food Protection (Emergency Prohibitions) (Amnesic Shellfish Poisoning) (West Coast) (No. 14) (Scotland) Order 2005 (S.S.I. 2005/529)
- Avian Influenza (Preventive Measures) (Scotland) Regulations 2005 (S.S.I. 2005/530)
- Avian Influenza (Preventive Measures in Zoos) (Scotland) Regulations 2005 (S.S.I. 2005/531)
- Public Appointments and Public Bodies etc. (Scotland) Act 2003 (Treatment of Office or Body as Specified Authority) Order 2005 (S.S.I. 2005/539)
- Public Appointments and Public Bodies etc. (Scotland) Act 2003 (Amendment of Specified Authorities) Order 2005 (S.S.I. 2005/540)
- Food Labelling Amendment (No. 3) (Scotland) Regulations 2005 (S.S.I. 2005/542)
- Teachers' Superannuation (Scotland) Amendment Regulations 2005 (S.S.I. 2005/543)
- National Health Service (Superannuation Scheme, Injury Benefits, Additional Voluntary Contributions and Compensation for Premature Retirement) (Civil Partnership) (Scotland) Amendment Regulations 2005 (S.S.I. 2005/544)
- Education (Graduate Endowment, Student Fees and Support) (Scotland) Amendment (No. 2) Regulations 2005 (S.S.I. 2005/545)
- Food Protection (Emergency Prohibitions) (Paralytic Shellfish Poisoning) (Orkney) (Scotland) Revocation Order 2005 (S.S.I. 2005/547)
- Food Protection (Emergency Prohibitions) (Paralytic Shellfish Poisoning) (Orkney) (No. 2) (Scotland) Order 2005 (S.S.I. 2005/548)
- Electricity from Non-Fossil Fuel Sources (Scotland) Saving Arrangements Order 2005 (S.S.I. 2005/549)
- Common Services Agency (Membership and Procedure) Amendment (Scotland) Regulations 2005 (S.S.I. 2005/550)
- Food Protection (Emergency Prohibitions) (Amnesic Shellfish Poisoning) (West Coast) (No. 10) (Scotland) Partial Revocation Order 2005 (S.S.I. 2005/551)
- Sea Fishing (Enforcement of Community Control Measures) (Scotland) Amendment Order 2005 (S.S.I. 2005/552)
- Antisocial Behaviour etc. (Scotland) (Commencement and Savings) Amendment Order 2005 (S.S.I. 2005/553)
- Local Government Pensions Etc. (Civil Partnership) (Scotland) Amendment Regulations 2005 (S.S.I. 2005/554)
- Plant Health Fees (Scotland) Amendment Regulations 2005 (S.S.I. 2005/555)
- Marriages and Civil Partnerships (Fees) (Scotland) Regulations 2005 (S.S.I. 2005/556)
- Private Landlord Registration (Advice and Assistance) (Scotland) Regulations 2005 (S.S.I. 2005/557)
- Private Landlord Registration (Information and Fees) (Scotland) Regulations 2005 (S.S.I. 2005/558)
- Private Landlord Registration (Appeals against Decision as to Rent Payable) (Scotland) Regulations 2005 (S.S.I. 2005/559)
- Antisocial Behaviour Notice (Appeals against Order as to Rent Payable) (Scotland) Regulations 2005 (S.S.I. 2005/560)
- Antisocial Behaviour Notice (Management Control Orders) (Scotland) Regulations 2005 (S.S.I. 2005/561)
- Antisocial Behaviour Notice (Landlord Liability) (Scotland) Regulations 2005 (S.S.I. 2005/562)
- Antisocial Behaviour Notice (Advice and Assistance) (Scotland) Regulations 2005 (S.S.I. 2005/563)
- Education (Additional Support for Learning) (Scotland) Act 2004 (Commencement No. 3) Order 2005 (S.S.I. 2005/564)
- Disability Discrimination (Public Authorities) (Statutory Duties) (Scotland) Regulations 2005 (S.S.I. 2005/565)
- Firefighters' Pension Scheme Amendment (Scotland) Order 2005 (S.S.I. 2005/566)
- Civil Partnership (Supplementary Provisions relating to the Recognition of Overseas Dissolutions, Annulments or Separations) (Scotland) Regulations 2005 (S.S.I. 2005/567)
- Civil Partnership Act 2004 (Relationships Arising Through Civil Partnership) (Scotland) Order 2005 (S.S.I. 2005/568)
- Less Favoured Area Support Scheme (Scotland) Regulations 2005 (S.S.I. 2005/569)
- School Education (Ministerial Powers and Independent Schools) (Scotland) Act 2004 (Commencement No. 2 and Transitional Provisions) Order 2005 (S.S.I. 2005/570)
- Registration of Independent Schools (Scotland) Regulations 2005 (S.S.I. 2005/571)
- Civil Partnership Act 2004 (Modification of Subordinate Legislation) Order 2005 (S.S.I. 2005/572)
- Civil Partnership (Overseas Relationships) (Scotland) Order 2005 (S.S.I. 2005/573)
- Act of Adjournal (Criminal Procedure Rules Amendment No. 6) (Vulnerable Witnesses (Scotland) Act 2004) (Evidence on Commission) 2005 (S.S.I. 2005/574)
- Food Protection (Emergency Prohibitions) (Amnesic Shellfish Poisoning) (West Coast) (No. 15) (Scotland) Order 2005 (S.S.I. 2005/575)
- Scottish Water (Allt nan Corp) Water Order 2005 (S.S.I. 2005/576)
- Scottish Water (Allt Ach Na Braighe) Water Order 2005 (S.S.I. 2005/577)
- Scottish Water (Loch Bealach na Gaoithe) Water Order 2005 (S.S.I. 2005/578)
- Food Protection (Emergency Prohibitions) (Amnesic Shellfish Poisoning) (West Coast) (No. 16) (Scotland) Order 2005 (S.S.I. 2005/579)
- Fees in the Registers of Scotland Amendment Order 2005 (S.S.I. 2005/580)
- Criminal Justice (International Co operation) Act 1990 (Enforcement of Overseas Forfeiture Orders) (Scotland) Order 2005 (S.S.I. 2005/581)
- Act of Sederunt (Fees of Messengers-at-Arms) 2005 (S.S.I. 2005/582)
- Act of Sederunt (Fees of Sheriff Officers) 2005 (S.S.I. 2005/583)
- Criminal Legal Aid (Scotland) (Fees) Amendment (No. 2) Regulations 2005 (S.S.I. 2005/584)
- Food Protection (Emergency Prohibitions) (Amnesic Shellfish Poisoning) (West Coast) (No. 17) (Scotland) Order 2005 (S.S.I. 2005/585)
- Bovine Products (Restriction on Placing on the Market) (Scotland) (No. 2) Regulations 2005 (S.S.I. 2005/586)
- Diseases of Animals (Approved Disinfectants) Amendment (No. 2) (Scotland) Order 2005 (S.S.I. 2005/587)
- Mobility and Access Committee for Scotland Amendment Regulations 2005 (S.S.I. 2005/589)
- Vulnerable Witnesses (Scotland) Act 2004 (Commencement No. 2, Saving and Transitional Provisions) Order 2005 (S.S.I. 2005/590)
- Education (Recognised Bodies) Amendment (Scotland) Order 2005 (S.S.I. 2005/591)
- Education (Listed Bodies) (Scotland) Amendment (No. 2) Order 2005 (S.S.I. 2005/592)
- Protection of Water Against Agricultural Nitrate Pollution (Scotland) Amendment Regulations 2005 (S.S.I. 2005/593)
- Town and Country Planning (Limit of Annual Value) (Scotland) Order 2005 (S.S.I. 2005/594)
- Registration of Births, Still-births, Deaths and Marriages (Prescription of Forms) (Scotland) Amendment Regulations 2005 (S.S.I. 2005/595)
- Marriage (Prescription of Forms) (Scotland) Amendment Regulations 2005 (S.S.I. 2005/596)
- Fishery Products (Official Controls Charges) (Scotland) Regulations 2005 (S.S.I. 2005/597)
- Transfer of Rail Functions To The Scottish Ministers Order 2005 (S.S.I. 2005/598)
- Pesticides (Maximum Residue Levels in Crops, Food and Feeding Stuffs) (Scotland) Regulations 2005 (S.S.I. 2005/599)

== 601-663 ==
- Civil Partnership Act 2004 (Commencement No. 2) (Scotland) Order 2005 (S.S.I. 2005/604)
- Feeding Stuffs (Scotland) Regulations 2005 (S.S.I. 2005/605)
- Contaminants in Food (Scotland) Regulations 2005 (S.S.I. 2005/606)
- Meat (Official Controls Charges) (Scotland) Regulations 2005 (S.S.I. 2005/607)
- Feed (Hygiene and Enforcement) (Scotland) Regulations 2005 (S.S.I. 2005/608)
- Scottish Homes (Dissolution) Order 2005 (S.S.I. 2005/609)
- Adults with Incapacity (Management of Residents' Finances) (Scotland) Regulations 2005 (S.S.I. 2005/610)
- Regulation of Care (Social Service Workers) (Scotland) Amendment Order 2005 (S.S.I. 2005/611)
- Victim Statements (Prescribed Courts) (Scotland) Revocation Order 2005 (S.S.I. 2005/612)
- Plant Health (Scotland) Order 2005 (S.S.I. 2005/613)
- Smoke Control Areas (Authorised Fuels) (Scotland) Amendment Regulations 2005 (S.S.I. 2005/614)
- Smoke Control Areas (Exempt Fireplaces) (Scotland) Order 2005 (S.S.I. 2005/615)
- Official Feed and Food Controls (Scotland) Regulations 2005 (S.S.I. 2005/616)
- National Health Service (Charges for Drugs and Appliances) (Scotland) Amendment (No. 3) Regulations 2005 (S.S.I. 2005/617)
- National Health Service (Pharmaceutical Services) (Scotland) Amendment (No. 2) Regulations 2005 (S.S.I. 2005/618)
- Organic Aid (Scotland) Amendment Regulations 2005 (S.S.I. 2005/619)
- Rural Stewardship Scheme (Scotland) Amendment Regulations 2005 (S.S.I. 2005/620)
- Regional Transport Partnerships (Establishment, Constitution and Membership) (Scotland) Order 2005 (S.S.I. 2005/622)
- Civil Partnership Act 2004 (Consequential Amendments) (Scotland) Order 2005 (S.S.I. 2005/623)
- Less Favoured Area Support Scheme (Scotland) Amendment (No. 2) Regulations 2005 (S.S.I. 2005/624)
- Avian Influenza (Preventive Measures) (Date for Identification of Poultry Premises) (Scotland) Regulations 2005 (S.S.I. 2005/625)
- Food Protection (Emergency Prohibitions) (Amnesic Shellfish Poisoning) (West Coast) (No. 18) (Scotland) Order 2005 (S.S.I. 2005/626)
- Food Protection (Emergency Prohibitions) (Amnesic Shellfish Poisoning) (West Coast) (No. 9) (Scotland) Revocation Order 2005 (S.S.I. 2005/627)
- Food Protection (Emergency Prohibitions) (Amnesic Shellfish Poisoning) (West Coast) (No. 10) (Scotland) Revocation Order 2005 (S.S.I. 2005/628)
- Civil Partnership (Jurisdiction and Recognition of Judgments) (Scotland) Regulations 2005 (S.S.I. 2005/629)
- Adults with Incapacity (Supervision of Welfare Guardians etc. by Local Authorities) (Scotland) Amendment Regulations 2005 (S.S.I. 2005/630)
- Adults with Incapacity (Countersignatories of Applications for Authority to Intromit) (Scotland) Amendment Regulations 2005 (S.S.I. 2005/631)
- Act of Sederunt (Rules of the Court of Session Amendment No. 9) (Civil Partnership Act 2004 etc.) 2005 (S.S.I. 2005/632)
- Act of Sederunt (Ordinary Cause Rules) Amendment (Civil Partnership Act 2004) 2005 (S.S.I. 2005/638)
- Fossil Fuel Levy (Scotland) Amendment Regulations 2005 (S.S.I. 2005/641)
- Smoking, Health and Social Care (Scotland) Act 2005 (Commencement No. 2) Order 2005 (S.S.I. 2005/642)
- Adoption and Children Act 2002 (Commencement No. 1) (Scotland) Order 2005 (S.S.I. 2005/643)
- Charities and Trustee Investment (Scotland) Act 2005 (Commencement No. 1) Order 2005 (S.S.I. 2005/644)
- Products of Animal Origin (Third Country Imports) (Scotland) Amendment (No. 2) Regulations 2005 (S.S.I. 2005/645)
- Avian Influenza (Preventive Measures) (Scotland) Amendment Regulations 2005 (S.S.I. 2005/646)
- Avian Influenza (Preventive Measures in Zoos) (Scotland) Amendment Regulations 2005 (S.S.I. 2005/647)
- Act of Sederunt (Ordinary Cause, Summary Application, Summary Cause and Small Claim Rules) Amendment (Miscellaneous) 2005 648)
- Scottish Water (Mill Loch) Order 2005 (S.S.I. 2005/649)
- Private Landlord Registration (Modification) (Scotland) Order 2005 (S.S.I. 2005/650)
- Road User Charging (Liability for Charges) (Scotland) Regulations 2005 (S.S.I. 2005/651)
- Road User Charging (Penalty Charges) (Scotland) Regulations 2005 (S.S.I. 2005/652)
- Transport of Animals (Cleansing and Disinfection) (Scotland) Regulations 2005 (S.S.I. 2005/653)
- Road User Charging Schemes (Keeping of Accounts and Relevant Expenses) (Scotland) Regulations 2005 (S.S.I. 2005/654)
- M77 (Malletsheugh) (Speed Limit) (Scotland) Regulations 2005 (S.S.I. 2005/655)
- Criminal Legal Aid (Scotland) (Fees) Amendment (No. 3) Regulations 2005 (S.S.I. 2005/656)
- Marriage (Approval of Places) (Scotland) Amendment Regulations 2005 (S.S.I. 2005/657)
- Contaminated Land (Scotland) Regulations 2005 (S.S.I. 2005/658)
- Fundable Bodies (Scotland) Order 2005 (S.S.I. 2005/660)
- Act of Sederunt (Rules of the Court of Session Amendment No. 10) (Proceeds of Crime: External Requests and Orders etc.) 2005 (S.S.I. 2005/663)
