= FSAS =

FSAS may refer to:

- Famous Stars and Straps, an American clothing and accessory line
- Assumption Island Airport, ICAO airport code FSAS
- Forum for South Asia Studies Uppsala University of Sweden
- Family Squatters Advisory Service, later Advisory Service for Squatters

== See also ==
- FSA (disambiguation)
- FSAScot, Fellow of the Society of Antiquaries of Scotland
