= Waste and Emissions Trading Act 2003 =

Act of the Parliament of the United Kingdom

Waste and Emissions Trading Act 2003 (Note: Section 42.)
- Act of Parliament
- Parliament of the United Kingdom
- Long title: An Act to make provision about waste and about penalties for non-compliance with schemes for the trading of emissions quotas.
- Citation: 2003 c. 33
- Introduced by: Michael Meacher (Commons); Lord Whitty (Lords)
- Territorial extent: United Kingdom (Note: Section 41.)

Dates
- Royal assent: 13 November 2003
- Commencement: Various (Note: Section 40.)
Other legislation
Amends	Environmental Protection Act 1990; Pollution Prevention and Control Act 1999; Greater London Authority Act 1999; Local Government Act 2000
Amended by	Landfill (Scheme Year and Maximum Landfill Amount) Regulations 2004; Hazardous Waste (England and Wales) Regulations 2005; Hazardous Waste (Wales) Regulations 2005; Local Government and Public Involvement in Health Act 2007; Waste (Scotland) Regulations 2011; Waste (England and Wales) Regulations 2011; Waste and Emissions Trading Act 2003 (Amendment) Regulations 2011; Waste and Emissions Trading Act 2003 (Amendment etc.) Regulations 2013; Natural Resources Body for Wales (Functions) Order 2013; Deregulation Act 2015; Waste Regulations (Northern Ireland) 2019; Waste (Miscellaneous Amendments) (EU Exit) Regulations 2019; Waste (Circular Economy) (Amendment) Regulations 2020; Retained EU Law (Revocation and Reform) Act 2023 (Consequential Amendment) Regulations 2023

Status: Amended

Text of statute as originally enacted

Text of the Waste and Emissions Trading Act 2003 as in force today (including any amendments) within the United Kingdom, from legislation.gov.uk.

The Waste and Emissions Trading Act 2003 (c. 33) is an act of the Parliament of the United Kingdom.

The white paper "Waste Strategy 2000: England and Wales" (Cm 4693) is a precursor of this act.

== Provisions ==
The act was designed to assist the UK in meeting the targets established by the European Union Landfill Directive. The targets were that the landfill rate had to reach 75% of 1995 waste levels by 2010, 50% by 2013, and 35% by 2020.

== Reception ==
The Local Government Chronicle described the act as a "controversial" measure.

Bodies representing local government criticised the legislation for potentially creating unavoidable costs for local authorities.

== Section 40 – Commencement ==
The following orders have been made under this section:

- The Waste and Emissions Trading Act 2003 (Commencement No. 1) Order 2004 (SI 2004/1163 (C. 49))
- The Waste and Emissions Trading Act 2003 (Commencement No. 2) Order 2004 (SI 2004/1874 (C. 80))
- The Waste and Emissions Trading Act 2003 (Commencement No. 3) Order 2004 (SI 2004/3192 (C. 138))
- The Waste and Emissions Trading Act 2003 (Commencement No. 1) (Great Britain) Order 2004 (SI 2004/3320 (C. 152))
- The Waste and Emissions Trading Act 2003 (Commencement No. 1) (England and Wales) Order 2004 (SI 2004/3319 (C. 151))
- The Waste and Emissions Trading Act 2003 (Commencement No. 1) (England) Order 2004 (SI 2004/3181 (C. 137))
- The Waste and Emissions Trading Act 2003 (Commencement No. 2) (England) Order 2004 (SI 2004/3321 (C. 153))
- The Waste and Emissions Trading Act 2003 (Commencement) (Wales) Order 2004 (SI 2004/1488 (W. 153))
- The Waste and Emissions Trading Act 2003 (Commencement) (Scotland) Order 2005 (SSI 2005/52 (C. 4))
- The Waste and Emissions Trading Act 2003 (Commencement No. 1) Order (Northern Ireland) 2004 (SR(NI) 2004/399 (C. 19))

== Bibliography ==
- Stephen Tromans. "Waste and Emissions Trading Act 2003". Current Law Statutes 2003. Sweet & Maxwell. London. W Green. Edinburgh. 2003. Volume 2. Chapter 33. pp 33-1 to 33-36.
- Halsbury's Statutes
