= List of acts of the Scottish Parliament from 2005 =

This is a list of acts of the Scottish Parliament passed in 2005. Acts of the Scottish Parliament are enacted by the Scottish Parliament, which has legislative authority over devolved matters in relation to Scotland under the authority of the Scotland Act 1998. Acts are cited by calendar year, in the same fashion as acts of Parliament of the United Kingdom. Each act passed in a respective year is numbered consecutively with Arabic numerals, following the prefix "asp".

16 acts of the Scottish Parliament were passed in 2005.

indicates that an act has been transcribed on Wikisource, indicates that an act is available to view at legislation.gov.uk, and indicates the location of the original act in the Parliamentary Archives.

== Acts of the Scottish Parliament ==
Short title	Citation	Royal assent
Long title
Breastfeeding etc. (Scotland) Act 2005	2005 asp 1	18 January 2005
An Act of the Scottish Parliament to make it an offence to prevent or stop a person in charge of a child who is otherwise permitted to be in a public place or licensed premises from feeding milk to that child in that place or on those premises; to make provision in relation to the promotion of breastfeeding; and for connected purposes.
Emergency Workers (Scotland) Act 2005	2005 asp 2	1 February 2005
An Act of the Scottish Parliament to make it an offence to assault or impede persons who provide emergency services; and for connected purposes.
Water Services etc. (Scotland) Act 2005	2005 asp 3	17 March 2005
An Act of the Scottish Parliament to establish the Water Industry Commission for Scotland; to create offences in relation to the unauthorised use of the public water and sewerage systems; to provide for licensing the provision of certain water and sewerage services; to amend the system for fixing charges for services provided by Scottish Water; to make provision as to Scottish Water's functions; to make provision in relation to coal mine water pollution; and for connected purposes.
Budget (Scotland) Act 2005	2005 asp 4	17 March 2005
An Act of the Scottish Parliament to make provision, for financial year 2005/06, for the use of resources by the Scottish Administration and certain bodies whose expenditure is payable out of the Scottish Consolidated Fund, for authorising the payment of sums out of the Fund and for the maximum amounts of borrowing by certain statutory bodies; to make provision, for financial year 2006/07, for authorising the payment of sums out of the Fund on a temporary basis; and for connected purposes.
Fire (Scotland) Act 2005	2005 asp 5	1 April 2005
An Act of the Scottish Parliament to make provision about fire and rescue authorities and joint fire and rescue boards; to restate and amend the law in relation to fire services; to make provision in relation to the functions of such authorities and boards in connection with certain events and situations other than fires; to make provision for implementing in part Council Directives 89/391/EEC, (Note: OSH Framework Directive (89/391/EEC)) 89/654/EEC, (Note: Workplace Directive (89/654/EEC)) 91/383/EEC, (Note: Safety and Health in Work Directive (91/383/EEC)) 94/33/EC, (Note: Young Workers Directive (94/33/EC)) 98/24/EC (Note: Chemical Agents Directive (98/24/EC)) and 99/92/EC; (Note: ATEX Workplace Directive 99/92/EC) to make other provision in relation to fire safety in certain premises; and for connected purposes.
Further and Higher Education (Scotland) Act 2005	2005 asp 6	1 June 2005
An Act of the Scottish Parliament to make provision establishing the Scottish Further and Higher Education Funding Council and provision as to its functions; to make provision as to support for further and higher education; to make provision relating to bodies which provide further and higher education; and for connected purposes.
Gaelic Language (Scotland) Act 2005	2005 asp 7	1 June 2005
An Act of the Scottish Parliament to establish a body having functions exercisable with a view to securing the status of the Gaelic language as an official language of Scotland commanding equal respect to the English language, including the functions of preparing a national Gaelic language plan, of requiring certain public authorities to prepare and publish Gaelic language plans in connection with the exercise of their functions and to maintain and implement such plans, and of issuing guidance in relation to Gaelic education.
Prohibition of Female Genital Mutilation (Scotland) Act 2005	2005 asp 8	1 July 2005
An Act of the Scottish Parliament to restate and amend the law relating to female genital mutilation and to provide for extra-territorial effect; and for connected purposes.
Protection of Children and Prevention of Sexual Offences (Scotland) Act 2005	2005 asp 9	12 July 2005
An Act of the Scottish Parliament to make it an offence to meet a child following certain preliminary contact and to make other provision for the purposes of protecting children from harm of a sexual nature, including provision for implementing in part Council Framework Decision 2004/68/JHA; and to make further provision about the prevention of sexual offences.
Charities and Trustee Investment (Scotland) Act 2005	2005 asp 10	14 July 2005
An Act of the Scottish Parliament to make provision about charities and other benevolent bodies; to make provision about fundraising in connection with charities and other benevolent bodies; to amend the law in relation to the investment powers of trustees; and for connected purposes.
Baird Trust Reorganisation Act 2005	2005 asp 11	19 July 2005
An Act of the Scottish Parliament to transfer the property, rights, interests and liabilities of The Baird Trust to a successor company limited by guarantee and to dissolve The Baird Trust; and for connected purposes.
Transport (Scotland) Act 2005	2005 asp 12	5 August 2005
An Act of the Scottish Parliament to provide for the setting up and functions of new transport bodies and to enable the Scottish Ministers to discharge certain transport functions; to provide further for the control and co-ordination of road works and for the enforcement of the duties placed on those who carry them out; to set up national concessionary fares schemes; and to make other, miscellaneous modifications of the law relating to transport.
Smoking, Health and Social Care (Scotland) Act 2005	2005 asp 13	5 August 2005
An Act of the Scottish Parliament to prohibit smoking in certain wholly or substantially enclosed places; to enable the Scottish Ministers by order to vary the minimum age limit of those to whom tobacco may be sold; to make provision in relation to general dental services, general ophthalmic services, personal dental services, pharmaceutical care services and detection of vision problems in children; to make provision in relation to disqualification by the NHS Tribunal; to enable the Scottish Ministers to establish a scheme for the making of payments to certain persons infected with hepatitis C as a result of NHS treatment and to certain persons infected with the virus by transmission of it from a person infected with it as a result of such treatment; to amend the Regulation of Care (Scotland) Act 2001 (Note: Regulation of Care (Scotland) Act 2001 (asp 8)) as respects what constitutes an independent health care service, the implementation of certain decisions by the Scottish Commission for the Regulation of Care or the Scottish Social Services Council, the provision of information to the Council and the minimum frequency of inspection of care services by the Commission; to make provision providing further time for applications to be made for registration of child care agencies and housing support services under the Regulation of Care (Scotland) Act 2001 and provide authorisation for the payment of certain grants to such services while not registered under that Act; to amend the Adults with Incapacity (Scotland) Act 2000 (Note: Adults with Incapacity (Scotland) Act 2000 (asp 4)) as respects authorisation of medical treatment; to amend the Public Health (Scotland) Act 1897 (Note: Public Health (Scotland) Act 1897 (60 & 61 Vict. c. 38)) to introduce a right of appeal in certain cases under that Act; to enable the Scottish Ministers to form, participate in and provide assistance to companies for the purpose of providing facilities or services for persons exercising functions under the National Health Service (Scotland) Act 1978 (Note: National Health Service (Scotland) Act 1978 (c. 29)) or of making money available to the health service in Scotland; to amend the rules as to membership of and other matters relating to the Scottish Hospital Endowments Research Trust; and for connected purposes.
Management of Offenders etc. (Scotland) Act 2005	2005 asp 14	8 December 2005
An Act of the Scottish Parliament to make provision for the establishment of community justice authorities; to make further provision for the supervision and care of persons put on probation or released from prison etc.; to make further provision as respects the procedures etc. of the Risk Management Authority; to make further provision as respects the powers of the High Court following the submission of a risk assessment report or of a report under section 210D of the Criminal Procedure (Scotland) Act 1995; (Note: Criminal Procedure (Scotland) Act 1995 (c. 46)) to amend Part 1 of the Prisoners and Criminal Proceedings (Scotland) Act 1993 (Note: Prisoners and Criminal Proceedings (Scotland) Act 1993 (c. 9)) so as to make further provision as respects the release of prisoners on licence; to make further provision for testing prisoners for drugs; to make further provision as respects the jurisdiction of the Scottish courts in proceedings for offences in relation to the notification requirements of Part 2 of the Sexual Offences Act 2003; (Note: Sexual Offences Act 2003 (c. 42)) to make further provision as respects proceedings in relation to an objection to the content of a risk assessment report; to make provision about the recovery of compensation from offenders; and for connected purposes.
Environmental Assessment (Scotland) Act 2005	2005 asp 15	14 December 2005
An Act of the Scottish Parliament to make provision for the assessment of the environmental effects of certain plans and programmes, including plans and programmes to which Directive 2001/42/EC (Note: Strategic Environmental Assessment Directive (2001/42/EC)) of the European Parliament and of the Council relates; and for connected purposes.
Licensing (Scotland) Act 2005	2005 asp 16	21 December 2005
An Act of the Scottish Parliament to make provision for regulating the sale of alcohol, and for regulating licensed premises and other premises on which alcohol is sold; and for connected purposes.

== See also ==
- List of acts of the Scottish Parliament
