= Protection of Children and Prevention of Sexual Offences (Scotland) Act 2005 =

Act of the Scottish Parliament

Protection of Children and Prevention of Sexual Offences (Scotland) Act 2005 (Note: Section 20(1).)
- Act of the Scottish Parliament
- Scottish Parliament
- Long title: An Act of the Scottish Parliament to make it an offence to meet a child following certain preliminary contact and to make other provision for the purposes of protecting children from harm of a sexual nature, including provision for implementing in part Council Framework Decision 2004/68/JHA; and to make further provision about the prevention of sexual offences.
- Citation: 2005 asp 9
- Territorial extent: Scotland

Dates
- Royal assent: 12 July 2005
- Commencement: 7 October 2005 (Note: Section 20(2). The Protection of Children and Prevention of Sexual Offences (Scotland) Act 2005 (Commencement and Savings) Order 2005 (SI 2005/480).)

Other legislation
- Amends: Criminal Procedure (Scotland) Act 1995
- Amended by: Violent Crime Reduction Act 2006
- Relates to: Sexual Offences (Scotland) Act 2009; Abusive Behaviour and Sexual Harm (Scotland) Act 2016

Status: Amended

Text of statute as originally enacted

Revised text of statute as amended

Text of the Protection of Children and Prevention of Sexual Offences (Scotland) Act 2005 as in force today (including any amendments) within the United Kingdom, from legislation.gov.uk.

The Protection of Children and Prevention of Sexual Offences (Scotland) Act 2005 (asp 9) is an act of the Scottish Parliament. The Protection of Children and Prevention of Sexual Offences bill was announced to the parliament by the First Minister of Scotland, Jack McConnell, in September 2004. It was passed on 2 June 2005, receiving Royal Assent on 12 July. The act introduced new offences related to child grooming, which had been addressed in England and Wales under the Sexual Offences Act 2003.

== Background and legislation ==
Following the Sexual Offences Act 2003 which introduced new legislation into England and Wales, there were calls by politicians and the police for similar laws to come into force in Scotland. There were concerns that the existing legislation made it difficult to prosecute people for child grooming before any sexual abuse had taken place. Some people suspected of grooming children over the internet for sex abuse had been charged with breach of the peace or lewd and libidinous practises. The Protection of Children and Prevention of Sexual Offences (Scotland) Act 2005 is one of several pieces of legislation introduced worldwide in the 2000s to introduce offences specifically related to child grooming. Other countries adopting similar laws included Australia, Canada, New Zealand and the United States.

The first part of the act makes it an offence to "meet a child following certain preliminary contact". It is an offense if a person ("A") has met or communicated with the child ("B") previously, "intends to engage in unlawful sexual activity involving B or in the presence of B", the child is under 16 years of age, and person A "does not reasonably believe that B is 16 or over".

The act allows the police to apply for a risk of sexual harm order (RSHO) for a person who has committed certain acts (at least two) related to child sex abuse, and is believed to be at risk to a particular child or children in general. The relevant acts referred to are "engaging in sexual activity involving a child or in the presence of a child", "causing or inciting a child to watch a person engaging in sexual activity or to look at a moving or still image that is sexual", "giving a child anything that relates to sexual activity or contains a reference to such activity" and "communicating with a child, where any part of the communication is sexual".

== Impact ==
In 2009, Green Party MSP Robin Harper raised concerns that only four people had been prosecuted under the act. He said that the act "clearly isn't working". The government responded that the act only covers particular offences and that in that year, under various legislation, 234 people in Scotland had been convicted of child sex offences.

A related act, the Sexual Offences (Scotland) Act 2009 was passed by the parliament in 2009.

== See also ==
- List of acts of the Scottish Parliament from 1999
- List of statutory instruments of Scotland, 2005

== Bibliography ==
- Davidson, Julia C. (2008), Child Sexual Abuse: Media Representations and Government Reactions, Routledge, ISBN 978-1-904385-68-4
