= Fire Services Act 1951 =

Act of the Parliament of the United Kingdom

Fire Services Act 1951 (Note: Section 4(1).)
- Act of Parliament
- Parliament of the United Kingdom
- Long title: An Act to amend sections twenty-six and twenty-seven of the Fire Services Act, 1947.
- Citation: 14 & 15 Geo. 6. c. 27
- Territorial extent: England and Wales; Scotland (Note: Section 4(4).)

Dates
- Royal assent: 10 May 1951
- Commencement: 10 June 1951 (Note: Section 4(3).)
- Repealed: England and Scotland: 1 October 2004 (Note: The Fire and Rescue Services Act 2004 (Commencement) (England and Scotland) Order 2004 (SI 2004/2304).); Wales: 10 November 2004 (Note: The Fire and Rescue Services Act 2004 (Commencement) (Wales) Order 2004 (SI 2004/2917).)
Other legislation
Amends	Fire Services Act 1947
Amended by	Social Security (Consequential Provisions) Act 1975
Repealed by	Fire and Rescue Services Act 2004

Status: Repealed

Text of statute as originally enacted

Revised text of statute as amended

The Fire Services Act 1951 (14 & 15 Geo. 6. c. 27) was an act of the Parliament of the United Kingdom, which extended only to Great Britain.

The act amended parts of the Fire Services Act 1947 (10 & 11 Geo. 6. c. 41) which dealt with the Firemen's Pension Scheme; it did not directly concern fire-fighting or the organisation of fire brigades in Great Britain.

== Subsequent developments ==
The whole act was repealed by section 54 of, and schedule 2 to, the Fire and Rescue Services Act 2004, which came into force on 1 October 2004 in England and Scotland and 10 November 2004 in Wales.

== See also ==
- Fire Services Act 1947
- Fire Services Act 1959
- Fire and Rescue Services Act 2004
- Fire (Scotland) Act 2005

== Bibliography ==
- John Burke and Clifford Walsh (eds). "Fire Services Act, 1951". Current Law Statutes Annotated 1951. Sweet & Maxwell. Stevens & Sons. London. W Green & Son. Edinburgh. 1951. Chapter 27. Google
- "The Fire Services Act, 1951". Halsbury's Statutes of England. Second Edition. Butterworths & Co (Publishers) Ltd. Bell Yard, Temple Bar. London. 1951. Volume 30: Continuation Volume 1951. Pages 86 to 88. See also pages 78 and 543.
- Halsbury's Statutes of England. Third Edition. Volume 13. Page 735.
- J T Edgerley, A D Yonge and A N C Shelley (eds). "The Fire Services Act, 1951" in "Fire Protection". Local Government Law and Administration in England and Wales. Butterworth & Co (Publishers) Ltd. 1952. Volume 29. Pages 225 to 227. See also pages v, 604 and 607.
- "Fire Services Act 1951 and Statutory Instruments", The Journal, The Institute of Civil Defence, vols 13 & 14
- Halsbury's Laws of England. Fourth Edition. Butterworths. London. 1977. Volume 18. Paragraphs 402, 465, 490 and 492 at pages 26, 193, 231, 244 and 246.
- Halsbury's Laws of England. (The Laws of England). Third Edition. Butterworth & Co (Publishers) Ltd. London. 1952. Volume 17. Pages xix, 250, 270, 271, 277 and 278.
- The Laws of Scotland: Stair Memorial Encyclopaedia. The Law Society of Scotland. Edinburgh. 1990. Volume 10. Paragraphs 1406, 1408 and 1443 at pages 709 and 711.
- Halsbury's Statutory Instruments. Butterworths. London. 1986. Volume 9. Title "Fire Services". Pages 4, 6 and 12.
- Halsbury's Statutory Instruments. Butterworth & Co (Publishers) Ltd. 1981. Volume 12. Page 333.
