= Fran Silvestre Arquitectos =

- Industry: Architecture
- Founded: 2005
- Founder: Fran Silvestre
- Headquarters: Valencia, Spain
- Website: www.fransilvestrearquitectos.com

Fran Silvestre Arquitectos is a studio based in Valencia made up a multidisciplinary group of architects founded in 2005 by architect Fran Silvestre. They currently have their studio in the former workshop of the sculptor Andreu Alfaro, where the Graduate School of Architecture and Design called MArch Valencia is also located, as well as the largest industrial design collection from Europe known as Alfaro Hofmann Collection.

The firm has developed projects in Spain mainly, but also in Croatia, Switzerland, Belgium, Greece, China, Brazil, El Salvador and United States. They work on residential, hotel, commercial and cultural projects.

== Notable projects ==
- Atrium House (2009)
- House in olive grove (2009)
- House on the mountainside of a castle (2010)
- Eolica Tower (2011)
- House on the cliff (2012)
- Aluminium House (2013)
- Balint House (2014)
- House between the Pine Forest (2016)
- Headquarters of the new offices ARV (2016)
- Hofmann House (2017)
- Petra Stone Atelier (2017)
- House of Sand (2019)
- Piera House (2021)
- Sabater House (2023)

== Awards ==
- Arquia Foundation, 2001
- Remodelling of the access crypt to Colonia Guell, Gaudí, 2002
- Mention COACV Award (2007, 2008, 2009)
- MHK Award (Berlin), 2009
- Selected for the exhibit “On Site: Architecture in Spain”, at the MoMA in New York, 2009
- Finalist in ArchDaily for Building of the year 2010
- Nagrade Hise Award, 2011
- Finalist in ArchDaily for Building of the year 2012
- Red Dot Design Award, 2013
- Award for Best Architecture Studio in Comunidad Valenciana, Tendencias, 2013
- Nominated for the ENOR Awards, 2014
- Selected for the Wan Awards, 2015
- Best Residential Architect BUILD Architecture Award, 2015
- Nominated for the German Design Award 2015
- XIII Spanish Biennial of Architecture and Urbanism Award, 2016
- German Design Award, 2021
- IFI DDA Award, 2022
- German Design Award, 2023

== Exhibitions ==
- 2008 "New Architecture in Spain", MoMA, New York
- 2012 "GA Gallery: Emerging Future", Tokyo
- 2013 "GA Houses Project", Tokyo
- 2013 Aimer, Aimer, Bâtir, Villa Noailles

== Bibliography ==
- Architectural Record April 2013 ISSN 0003-8598
- GA Document 121: International Emerging Future 2012 ISBN 978-4-87140-281-1
- GA Houses 127 ISBN 978-4-87140-797-7
- GA Houses 125 ISBN 978-4-87140-795-3
- GA Houses 121 ISBN 978-4-87140-791-5
