= Financial Services Act =

Financial Services Act may refer to:

- Financial Services Act 1986, of the Parliament of the United Kingdom
- Financial Services Act 2010, of the Parliament of the United Kingdom
- Financial Services Act 2012, of the Parliament of the United Kingdom
