= Retained firefighter =

Part-time / on-call / reserve firefighters in Ireland and the United Kingdom

In the United Kingdom and Ireland, a retained firefighter, also known as an RDS firefighter or on-call firefighter, is a firefighter who does not work on a fire station full-time but is paid to spend long periods of time on call to respond to emergencies through the Retained Duty System. Many have full-time jobs outside the fire service. Retained firefighters are employed and trained by the local fire and rescue service.

When required to answer an emergency call, retained firefighters are summoned to the fire station by a radio pager (also known as an "alerter"). Once at the station, the crews staff the fire engine and proceed to the incident. Retained firefighters are therefore required to live or work near to the fire station they serve. This allows them to respond to emergencies within acceptable and strict attendance time targets set out by each fire service.

Typically, retained firefighters are employed in rural areas or in large villages, small towns or run a second or third appliance at full time stations as a backup crew. They provide cover to 90% of the area of the UK - there are 14,000 in England and Wales. Of the approximately 8,500 operational firefighters in Scotland, about 32% are retained. The London Fire Brigade and West Midlands Fire Service are the only fire and rescue services in the UK that do not have any retained firefighters.

Unlike volunteer firefighters, retained firefighters are paid for attending incidents. Both volunteers and retained are paid an annual "retainer fee" for being on call, but only retained firefighters receive further pay for each emergency call they respond to. The Fire Brigades Union (FBU) and the Retained Firefighters' Union (RFU) represent the interests of retained firefighters across the UK. In Ireland, they are represented by the Services, Industrial, Professional and Technical Union (SIPTU).

== Emergency response ==
Wholetime firefighters do not usually respond to emergencies during the time when they are off duty, unless there are under dual contract arrangements. Generally, wholetime or full-time firefighters do not respond to calls when they are off-duty as they are assigned to a watch on permanent shifts. However, most retained firefighters can only provide cover at set times due to their full-time employment commitments. For example, it may be that some personnel can provide cover during the day in any given week or only evenings and weekends per week. Often it is a mixture of both.

Historically, on-call firefighters in parts of the British Isles were summoned by a variety of ways, with the most popular being bells tolling either on or beside the local fire station, or other central locations such as parks and town halls.

By the 1950s, many retained stations in the UK and Ireland began to use repurposed Wartime air raid sirens also mounted on the station roof or its training tower. This was accompanied by house bells installed at on-call firefighters’ homes, connected directly to the phoneline and would ring alongside the station siren in the event of a call-out. The siren and house bells replaced public fire bells as a more effective way of summoning the local on-call fire brigades. This system remained active in the majority of England until the early 1970s at the latest, when the first pager systems were introduced to fire services, effectively replacing both the house bells and station sirens. However, the Northern Ireland Fire Brigade despite already being supplied with pagers, continued to operate a network of station sirens until 1996, when Health and Safety Legislation made the system redundant. Call-out Sirens were also common in the Republic Of Ireland, although this varied largely depending on the county. With the exception of some older stations in County Cork, they are all on a pager system, either controlled locally in the case of Cork and Dublin, or by a regional control centre (CAMP) in the rest of the country.

Unlike volunteer firefighters in some U.S. states, retained firefighters are not permitted to use emergency lights or sirens on their personal vehicles. When they drive to the fire station, they must obey normal road traffic laws at all times whilst en route. The British government reviewed the situation in 2008, but decided that to give every retained firefighter a blue light would effectively "dilute" the importance of blue lights. Most importantly, use of blue lights by retained staff may cause confusion for local road users, particularly where multiple vehicles would be responding to a particular fire station from several directions at once.

== Role within the community ==
In the UK, retained firefighters are responsible for undertaking community fire safety work alongside their full-time colleagues. This involves talks to local school children, home safety checks, and fitting of free smoke detectors in homes.

Some fire and rescue services employ a system known as "day manning" or "day staffing", where the fire station is operated by a full-time watch during the day and covered by retained firefighters at night.

== Training and competency ==
Whole-time firefighters attend training school for an initial period of 13–20 weeks, depending on the fire and rescue service they have joined. On-call firefighters now undertake the same training modules as full-time recruits, spread over a greater period of time due to full-time employment job commitments. The new National Firefighter Training Syllabus is now widely-adopted and consists of a three-week "core skills" module, a two-week breathing apparatus module, a one-week HAZMAT module, a one-week road traffic collision module, plus several weekend trauma care/EMT and first aid courses. On completion of this, firefighters then enter an on station development stage over a three-year period, once they have completed their development stage they then become competent and receive a higher level of pay. The modules are also backed up by ongoing training on station in multi-disciplined roles, procedures and equipment. However, many fire services do not allow retained firefighters to transfer directly to wholetime firefighter without completing a full 13-week new recruits course.

In December 2003, recognising the need for a review of the retained duty system, the Office of the Deputy Prime Minister, the department responsible for fire and resilience at that time, called for a report. Published in February 2005, it noted:

The system of flexible local fire cover needs to attract a new pool of applicants who would not have considered the opportunity previously. The recruitment problems stem in part from the level of pay, the lack of a pension, the lack of development opportunities and the often inflexible availability system.'

== Other duties ==
As well as responding to emergency calls and undertaking community fire safety initiatives, retained firefighters attend weekly training nights (aka "drill nights") of two to three hours per week to maintain competency levels. They must also undertake routine checks on their equipment and fire appliance, as well as test, clean and maintain the equipment to ensure it will work properly when required during an emergency. To allow retained firefighters to boost their earnings, some retained stations are involved in co-responder schemes, whereby fire crews act as first responders providing first aid prior to the attendance of paramedics.
