= Fire Services Act 1959 =

Act of the Parliament of the United Kingdom

Fire Services Act 1959 (Note: Section 14(1).)
- Act of Parliament
- Parliament of the United Kingdom
- Long title: An Act to amend the Fire Services Act 1947, and make further provision as to the pensions of persons transferring to or from the fire service and as to members of fire brigades becoming temporary instructors in training establishments.
- Citation: 7 & 8 Eliz. 2. c. 44
- Territorial extent: England and Wales; Scotland; (Note: Section 14(3).)

Dates
- Royal assent: 9 July 1959
- Commencement: various (Note: Section 14(2).)
- Repealed: England: 1 October 2004 (Note: The Fire and Rescue Services Act 2004 (Commencement) (England and Scotland) Order 2004 (SI 2004/2304).); Wales: 10 November 2004 (Note: The Fire and Rescue Services Act 2004 (Commencement) (Wales) Order 2004 (SI 2004/2917).)
Other legislation
Amends	Fire Services Act 1947
Amended by	Statute Law (Repeals) Act 1974; Local Government Act 1985; Fire (Scotland) Act 2005
Repealed by	England and Wales: Fire and Rescue Services Act 2004

Status: Partially repealed

Text of statute as originally enacted

Text of the Fire Services Act 1959 as in force today (including any amendments) within the United Kingdom, from legislation.gov.uk.

The Fire Services Act 1959 (7 & 8 Eliz. 2. c. 44) is an act of the Parliament of the United Kingdom passed "to amend the Fire Services Act 1947 (10 & 11 Geo. 6. c. 41), and make further provision as to the pensions of persons transferring to or from the fire service and as to members of fire brigades becoming temporary instructors in training establishments."

== Subsequent developments ==
Sections 1 and 14(4) of, and the schedule to, the act, together with words in sections 5 and 6, were repealed by section 1 of, and part XI of the schedule to, the Statute Law (Repeals) Act 1974, which came into force on 27 June 1974.

The whole act was repealed for England and Wales by section 54 of, and schedule 2 to, the Fire and Rescue Services Act 2004, which came into force for England on 1 October 2004 and for Wales on 10 November 2004.

The whole act, except sections 8–10, was repealed by section 89(2) of, and schedule 4 to, the Fire (Scotland) Act 2005, which came into force on 2 August 2005. The remaining sections deal with pensions and the employment of temporary instructors.
