= Fire and Rescue Services Act 2004 =

Act of the Parliament of the United Kingdom

Fire and Rescue Services Act 2004 (Note: Section 64.)
- Act of Parliament
- Parliament of the United Kingdom
- Long title: An Act to make provision about fire and rescue authorities and their functions; to make provision about employment by, and powers of employees of, fire and rescue authorities; to make provision about education and training and pension schemes; to make provision about the supply of water; to make provision about false alarms of fire; to provide for the funding of advisory bodies; and for connected purposes.
- Citation: 2004 c. 21
- Territorial extent: England and Wales; Scotland (in part); (Note: Section 63.)

Dates
- Royal assent: 22 July 2004
- Commencement: England and Scotland: 1 October 2004 (England and Scotland) (Note: Section 61. The Fire and Rescue Services Act 2004 (Commencement) (England and Scotland) Order 2004 (SI 2004/2304).); Wales: 10 November 2004 (Note: Section 61. The Fire and Rescue Services Act 2004 (Commencement) (Wales) Order 2004 (SI 2004/2917).)
Other legislation
Amends	Explosives Act 1875; Public Works Loans Act 1965; Pensions (Increase) Act 1971; Fire Safety and Safety of Places of Sport Act 1987; Football Spectators Act 1989; Town and Country Planning Act 1990; Water Industry Act 1991; Water Resources Act 1991; Capital Allowances Act 2001
Repeals/revokes	Fire Services Act 1947; Fire Services Act 1951; Fire Services Act 1959
Amended by	Co-operative and Community Benefit Societies Act 2014; Policing and Crime Act 2017

Status: Amended

Text of statute as originally enacted

Revised text of statute as amended

The Fire and Rescue Services Act 2004 (c. 21), sometimes abbreviated as FRSA 2004, is an act of the Parliament of the United Kingdom.

== Provisions ==
The act requires the government to publish a national framework for its expectations from fire and rescue services.

== Reception ==
The act was criticised by the Fire Brigades Union, describing it as setting up "fantasy regional government powers" on the basis that it gave significant powers to the Office of the Deputy Prime Minister.

== Implementation ==
The act was commenced in England in October 2004. The first national framework was published in April 2006.
