= Fire (Scotland) Act 2005 =

Act of the Scottish Parliament

Fire (Scotland) Act 2005 (Note: Section 91.)
- Act of the Scottish Parliament
- Scottish Parliament
- Long title: An Act of the Scottish Parliament to make provision about fire and rescue authorities and joint fire and rescue boards; to restate and amend the law in relation to fire services; to make provision in relation to the functions of such authorities and boards in connection with certain events and situations other than fires; to make provision for implementing in part Council Directives 89/391/EEC, 89/654/EEC, 91/383/EEC, 94/33/EC, 98/24/EC and 99/92/EC; to make other provision in relation to fire safety in certain premises; and for connected purposes.
- Citation: 2005 asp 5
- Territorial extent: Scotland

Dates
- Royal assent: 1 April 2005
- Commencement: various (Note: Section 90.)

Other legislation
- Amends: Local Government (Scotland) Act 1973; Water (Scotland) Act 1980; Criminal Procedure (Consequential Provisions) (Scotland) Act 1995
- Repeals/revokes: 25 other acts of the parliaments of the United Kingdom and Scotland
- Amended by: Police and Fire Reform (Scotland) Act 2012

Status: Amended

Text of statute as originally enacted

Revised text of statute as amended

Text of the Fire (Scotland) Act 2005 as in force today (including any amendments) within the United Kingdom, from legislation.gov.uk.

The Fire (Scotland) Act 2005 (asp 5) is an act of the Scottish Parliament which made certain reforms to fire and rescue services in Scotland.

During the passage of the bill, the Scottish Executive published a draft fire and rescue framework.

== Provisions ==
The act makes dealing with some road traffic accidents and dealing with serious non-fire emergencies a statutory duty of fire and rescue services.

The act allows for more local decision making.

The bill for this act was passed on 23 February 2005 and received royal assent on 1 April 2005.

== Reception ==
The act was criticised by the Scottish chairman of the Fire Brigades Union due to provisions relating to cutting response times to fire alarms from buildings potentially leading to resources being more spread out.

== Repeals, etc. ==
Schedule 3 amended 25 other acts of the Parliaments of the United Kingdom and Scotland.
Schedule 4 amended 12 other act, most significantly the Fire Services Act 1947 and the Fire Services Act 1959 but did not repeal any act entirely.
