= Fire service co-responder =

Firefighters who respond to ambulance calls

Co-Responder logo

In the United Kingdom, fire service co-responders are firefighters who also respond to ambulance calls. The aim of a co-responder team is to preserve life until the arrival of either an ambulance or a response vehicle from the NHS ambulance service. Co-responder vehicles are equipped with oxygen and automatic external defibrillation (AED) equipment. This is a similar but different role to community first responders, who have a similar role but do not work for the fire service.
