= Fire Services Act 1947 =

Act of the Parliament of the United Kingdom

Fire Services Act 1947 (Note: Section 39(1).)
- Act of Parliament
- Parliament of the United Kingdom
- Long title: An Act to make further provision for fire services in Great Britain; to transfer fire-fighting functions from the National Fire Service to fire brigades maintained by the councils of counties and county boroughs; to provide for the combination of areas for fire service purposes; to make further provision for pensions and other awards in respect of persons employed in connection with the provision of fire services; and for purposes connected with the matters aforesaid.
- Citation: 10 & 11 Geo. 6. c. 41
- Territorial extent: England and Wales; Scotland; (Note: Section 39(2).)

Dates
- Royal assent: 31 July 1947
- Commencement: 31 July 1947 (in part); (rest of act); (Note: Section 38(1).)
- Repealed: England: 1 October 2004 (Note: The Fire and Rescue Services Act 2004 (Commencement) (England and Scotland) Order 2004 (SI 2004/2304).); Wales: 10 November 2004 (Note: The Fire and Rescue Services Act 2004 (Commencement) (Wales) Order 2004 (SI 2004/2917).)
Other legislation
Amended by	Fire Services Act 1951; Police Act 1964; Police (Scotland) Act 1967; Theft Act 1968; Fire Precautions Act 1971; Social Security (Consequential Provisions) Act 1975; Acquisition of Land Act 1981; Fire Service College Board (Abolition) Act 1982; Statute Law (Repeals) Act 1986; Statute Law (Repeals) Act 1989; Fire (Scotland) Act 2005; Policing and Crime Act 2017
Repealed by	England and Wales: Fire and Rescue Services Act 2004

Status: Partially repealed

Text of statute as originally enacted

Revised text of statute as amended

Text of the Fire Services Act 1947 as in force today (including any amendments) within the United Kingdom, from legislation.gov.uk.

The Fire Services Act 1947 (10 & 11 Geo. 6. c. 41) is an act of the Parliament of the United Kingdom that reorganised fire services in the United Kingdom. It disbanded the National Fire Service and returned the responsibility for running fire services to local authorities.

== Provisions ==
ss. 1 to 3 Provision of fire services
ss. 4 to 12 Fire Authorities
ss.13 to 16 Supply of water for fire-fighting
ss.17 to 25 Administrative provisions
ss.26 to 28 Pensions etc.
ss.29 to 39 Miscellaneous and General
First to Sixth Schedules

== Extent and repeals ==
While the original act did not contain an "Extent" section, the preamble and text addressed Great Britain (and parts thereof) only.

=== England and Wales ===
The Fire Services Act 1947 was entirely repealed in England and Wales by the Fire and Rescue Services Act 2004, now the primary legislation for England and Wales.

=== Scotland ===
The Fire and Rescue Services Act 2004 extended only to England and Wales, thus leaving the Fire Services Act 1947 in force in Scotland. Most of the 1947 Act was later repealed by the Fire (Scotland) Act 2005, which left ss. 26 to 27A (concerning the Firemen's Pension Scheme) still in force in Scotland.

=== Northern Ireland ===
The act does not extend to Northern Ireland.

== See also ==
- Fire services in Scotland
- Fire service in the UK
- History of fire safety legislation in the United Kingdom
- History of fire brigades in the United Kingdom
