= Index of firefighting articles =

Firefighting is the act of extinguishing destructive fires. A firefighter fights these fires with the intent to prevent destruction of life, property and the environment. Firefighting is a highly technical profession, which requires years of training and education in order to become proficient. A fire can rapidly spread and endanger many lives; however, with modern firefighting techniques, catastrophe can usually be avoided. To help prevent fires from starting, a firefighter's duties include public education and conducting fire inspections. Because firefighters are often the first responders to victims in critical conditions, firefighters often also provide basic life support as emergency medical technicians or advanced life support as licensed paramedics. Firefighters make up one of the major emergency services, along with the emergency medical service, the police, and many others.

== 0-9 ==
- 911

== A ==
- Advanced life support
- Aerial firefighting
- Airport Crash Tender
- Alarm
- Arson

== B ==
- Backdraft
- Basic life support
- Boiling Liquid Expanding Vapor Explosion (BLEVE)
- Blues and twos
- Brush fire
- Bunker gear
- Burn
- Bushfire

== C ==
- Car accident
- Carbon monoxide poisoning
- Chief Fire and Rescue Adviser
- Chief Fire Officers Association
- Chimney fire
- Combustion
- Confined space rescue
- Controlled burn

== D ==
- Dead Man Zone
- Dispatcher
- Drafting water
- Dry standpipe
- Dry riser

== E ==
- Emergency evacuation
- Emergency medical services
- Emergency medical technician
- Emergency service
- Emergency services
- Emergency vehicle lighting
- Enhanced 911
- Evacuation
- Explosion

== F ==
- Fire
- Fire and Rescue Services Act 2004
- Fire alarm system
- Fire apparatus
- Fire authority
- Fire bike
- Fire brigade
- Fire Brigades Act 1938
- Fire Brigades Union
- Fire chief's vehicle
- Fire classes
- Fire code
- Fire control
- Fire department
- Fire department ranks by country
- Fire engine
- Fire extinguisher
- Fire hazard
- Fire fighting foam
- Firefighting in the United States
- Fire hose
- Fire hydrants
- Fire inspector
- Fire investigation
- Fire lookout tower
- Fire marshal
- Fire Master
- Fire point
- Fire Police
- Fire protection
- Fire-retardant material
- Fire safety
- Fire safety officer
- Fire Service College
- Fire service in the United Kingdom
- Fire Services Act 1947
- Fire siren
- Fire sprinkler
- Fire sprinkler system
- Fire station
- Fire tetrahedron
- Fire triangle
- Fire Watch
- First aid
- First Responder
- FiReControl
- Firefighter
- Firefighter Assist and Search Team
- Firefighter's Combat Challenge
- Firefighting
- Firefighting worldwide
- FireLink
- Firemen's Association of the State of New York
- Fireman's carry
- Fireman's switch
- Firestorm
- Firewall (construction)
- Flammable liquid
- Flash fire
- Flashover
- Forcible entry
- Forest fire

== G ==
- Gaseous fire suppression
- Glossary of firefighting equipment
- Glossary of wildland fire terms
- Gold Silver Bronze command structure

== H ==
- Haz-Mat
- Heat detector
- Heavy rescue vehicle
- Her Majesty's Fire Service Inspectorate for Scotland
- History of fire brigades in the United Kingdom
- History of fire safety legislation in the United Kingdom
- History of firefighting
- Hose Pack
- Hose Vacuum

== I ==
- Incident Command System
- Independent Review of the Fire Service
- Institution of Fire Engineers
- International Association of Fire Fighters
- International Association of Wildland Fire
- International Fire Service Training Association
- International Firefighters' Day

== L ==
- List of firefighting films
- List of historic fires
- London Fire Brigade
- London Fire Brigade Museum

== M ==
- Master stream
- Medical alarm
- Mini Pumper

== N ==
- National Fire Incident Reporting System
- National Fire Information Council
- National Fire Protection Association
- National Incident Management System
- National Transportation Safety Board
- New Dimension programme
- New Zealand Professional Firefighters Union
- Nomex

== P ==
- Paramedic

== Q ==
- Quint

== R ==
- Regulatory Reform (Fire Safety) Order 2005
- Rope rescue

== S ==
- Search and rescue
- Self contained breathing apparatus
- Self-immolation
- Siren
- Smoke
- Smoke detector
- Smoke inhalation
- Smokejumper
- Splash suit
- Standpipe (firefighting)
- Station Officer
- Stop, drop and roll
- Structure fire
- Super Scooper
- Surface water rescue

== T ==
- Thermal imaging camera (firefighting)
- Turntable ladder
- Two-in, two-out

== U ==
- UK firefighter dispute 2002-2003
- United Firefighters Union of Australia

== V ==
- Vehicle fire
- Ventilation
- Volunteer fire department
- Water cannon
- Water pressure
- Water tender
- Wet standpipe
- Wetdown
- Wildfire
- Wildland fire engine
- Women in firefighting
- World Police and Fire Games
