= Outline of firefighting =

Overview of and topical guide to firefighting

The following outline is provided as an overview of and topical guide to firefighting:

Firefighting – act of extinguishing fires. A firefighter fights these fires to prevent destruction of life, property and the environment. Firefighting is a highly technical skill that requires professionals who have spent years training in both general firefighting techniques and specialized areas of expertise.

== Essence of firefighting ==
- Fire
- Fire department
- Firefighter

== Types of uncontrolled fires ==
- fire on board
- Firestorm
- Structure fire
- Wildfire
  - Forest fire
  - Brush fire

== Firefighting organizations ==
=== Agencies ===
- Fire authority
- Fire department
- Fire service in the United Kingdom
- National Fire Information Council
- National Fire Protection Association

=== Fire departments ===
- Cleveland Division of Fire
- Fire Services Department, Hong Kong
- London Fire Brigade
- International Association of Wildland Fire
- Singapore Civil Defence Force

=== Unions and professional associations ===
- Chief Fire Officers Association
- Fire Brigades Union
- Institution of Fire Engineers
- International Association of Fire Fighters
- New Zealand Professional Firefighters Union
- United Firefighters Union of Australia
- UK firefighter dispute 2002-2003
- Southern African Emergency Services Institute - South Africa

=== Museums ===
- London Fire Brigade Museum

=== Training establishments ===
- Fire Service College

== History of firefighting ==
History of fire brigades

- History of fire brigades in the United Kingdom
- List of historic fires

== General firefighting concepts ==
- Airport Crash Tender
- Advanced life support
- Arson
- Backdraft
- Basic life support
- Burn
- Bunker gear
- Combustion
- Dead Man Zone
- Deluge gun
- Dispatcher
- Draft
- Dry riser
- Dry Standpipe
- Emergency medical services
- Emergency medical technician
- Emergency service
- Enhanced 911
- Evacuation
- Fire apparatus
- Fireboat
- Fire chief's vehicle
- Fire code
- Fire classes
- Fire control
- Fire department
- Fire engine
- Firefighter
- Firefighter Assist and Search Team
- Firefighting worldwide
- Fire hazard
- Fire siren
- Fireman's switch
- Fire hydrant
- Fire inspector
- Fire lookout tower
- Fireman's carry
- Fire Marshal
- Fire Master
- Fire point
- Fire police
- Fire protection
- Fire-retardant material
- Fire safety
- Fire Service College
- Fire station
- Fire tetrahedron
- Fire triangle
- Fire truck
- Firefighter's Combat Challenge
- Firewall
- First aid
- First Responder
- Flash fire
- Flash point
- Flashover
- Forcible entry
- Gaseous fire suppression
- Heat detector
- Immolation
- International Association of Fire Fighters
- International Firefighters' Day
- London Fire Brigade Museum
- Master stream
- National Fire Incident Reporting System
- Nomex
- Paramedic
- Self contained breathing apparatus
- Short circuit
- Siren
- Smoke detector
- Smoke inhalation
- Smokejumper
- Splash suit
- Station Officer
- Stop, drop and roll
- Structure fire
- Super Scooper
- Two-in, two-out
- Uncontrolled fire
- Ventilation
- Volunteer fire department
- Water tender
- Wetdown
- Wildfire
- World Police and Fire Games

== Policy and legislation ==
- Chief Fire and Rescue Adviser
- Fire authority
- Fire Brigades Act 1938
- Fire Services Act 1947
- Fire and Rescue Services Act 2004
- Fire service in the United Kingdom
- Her Majesty's Fire Service Inspectorate for Scotland
- History of fire safety legislation in the United Kingdom
- Independent Review of the Fire Service
- Regulatory Reform (Fire Safety) Order 2005

== Operational command and procedures ==
- Gold Silver Bronze command structure
- FiReControl
- FireLink
- New Dimension programme

== Firefighting lists ==
Glossary of firefighting terms

- List of UK public fire and rescue services
- Glossary of firefighting equipment
- Glossary of wildland fire terms
- List of historic fires
- List of firefighting films

== See also ==
- Women in firefighting
