= NFIC =

NFIC may refer to:

- NFIC (gene)
- National Fire Information Council, United States
