= UFU =

UFU may refer to either:

- The United Firefighters Union of Australia
- Ukrainian Free University in Munich, Germany
- Ural Federal University in Russia
- Universidade Federal de Uberlândia
- Ulster Farmers Union
- the Bashkir name of the city of Ufa
