= FASNY =

FASNY may refer to:

- Firefighters Association of the State of New York
- French-American School of New York
