= Geography of firefighting =

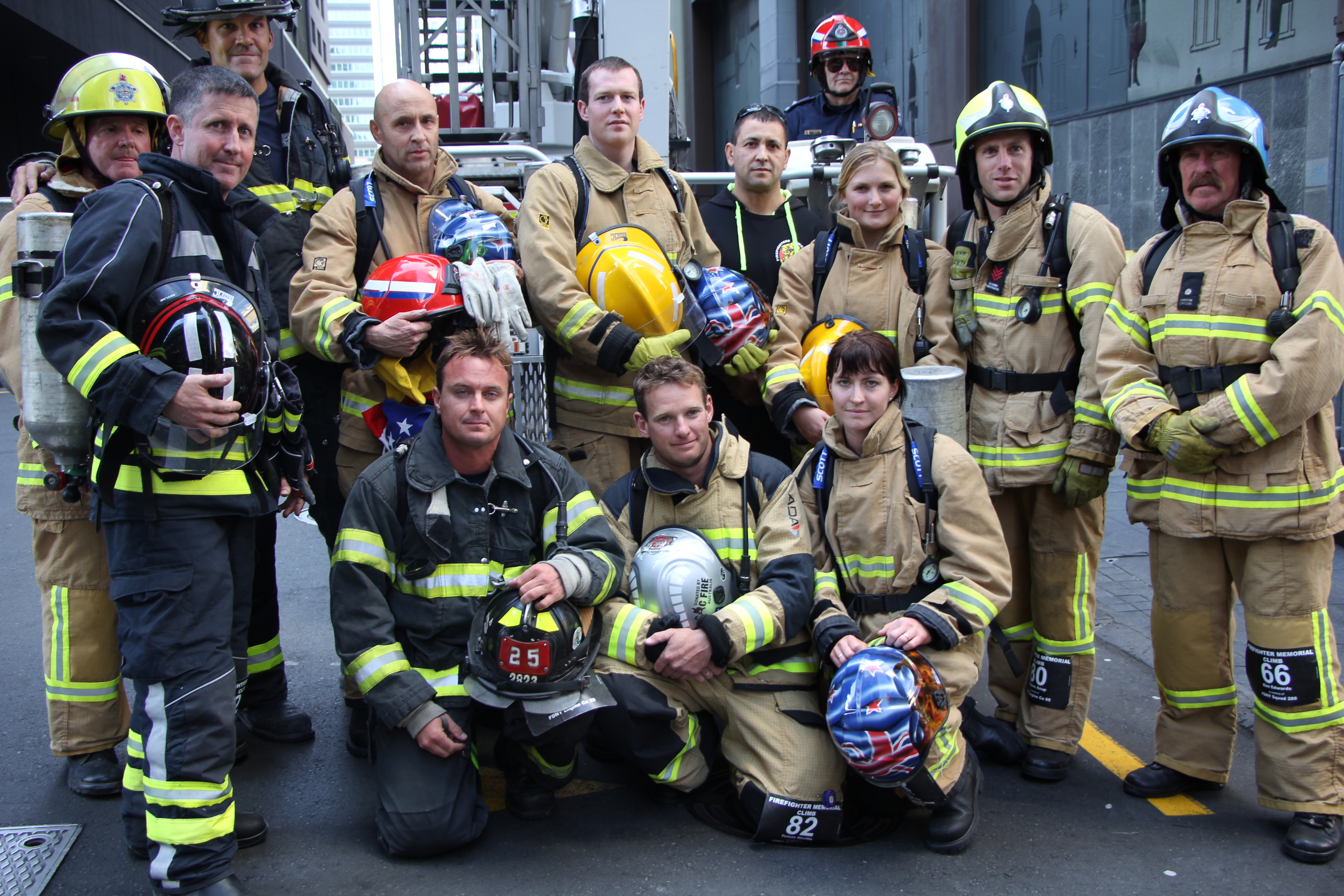
Firefighters from New Zealand, Australia, and the United States standing together in Auckland to commemorate the 13th anniversary of the September 11 attacks.

Firefighting, alongside the approaches by various nations and organizations to support it, vary across different countries and regions. Differences in climate, terrain, urban development, and available technology shape how fire services are organized and how fires are managed globally. In some countries, firefighting is handled primarily by professional, government-run departments, while others rely heavily on volunteer brigades or hybrid systems. Local fire codes, water supply infrastructure, and risk factors such as wildfires or industrial hazards also influence firefighting approaches, making the majority of countries individual approach to firefighting unique to them.

Below describes an overview of how firefighting is handled by country. Note this is a dynamic list, and not all countries are listed.

== Andorra ==
The Andorran Fire Brigade, with headquarters at Santa Coloma, operates from four modern fire stations, and has a staff of around 120 firefighters. The service is equipped with 24 fire service vehicles: 16 heavy appliances (fire tenders, turntable ladders, and specialist four-wheel drive vehicles), four light support vehicles (cars and vans), and four ambulances. Service is provided full-time, with five fire crews on station on a shift basis, and other firefighters available on call.

== Antarctica ==
The Antarctic Fire Department is headquartered at McMurdo Station and is the only full-service fire department on the continent. They respond to all emergencies including fire, medical, and rescues at the American stations, McMurdo and Amundsen-Scott South Pole, and provide mutual aid response to other stations, notably the Kiwi Scott Base.

== Australia ==
In Australia, fire services are state/territory organisations.

Generally, there are three types of firefighting organisations. One is salaried and mostly handles urban areas, one is volunteer and generally handles rural areas, and one handles government managed public land (mainly forests and plantations).

In the Australian Capital Territory:

- ACT Fire and Rescue
- ACT Rural Fire Service

In New South Wales:

- Fire and Rescue NSW
- New South Wales Rural Fire Service
- National Parks and Wildlife Service (New South Wales)
- Forestry Corporation of NSW

In the Northern Territory:

- Northern Territory Fire and Rescue Service

In Queensland:

- Queensland Fire and Emergency Services

In South Australia:

- South Australian Metropolitan Fire Service
- South Australian Country Fire Service

In Tasmania:

- Tasmania Fire Service

In Victoria:

- Metropolitan Fire Brigade
- Country Fire Authority (CFA)
- Forest Fire Management Victoria

In Western Australia:

- Department of Fire and Emergency Services is the overarching body. The fire services consist of the:
  - Career Fire and Rescue Service (FRS)
  - Volunteer Bush Fire Service (BFS)
  - Volunteer Fire and Emergency Services (VFES)
  - Volunteer Fire and Rescue Service (VFRS)

== Austria ==
The structure in Austria is similar to that of Germany. There are just six career fire services in Vienna, Graz, Innsbruck, Klagenfurt, Salzburg and Linz. As of 2007, some 4,527 volunteer fire departments, the back-bone of the Austrian fire service, relied on about 320,000 men and women voluntary firefighters as active members. Fire departments exist in even the smallest Austrian villages, where they contribute to community life, usually by organizing fairs and other fund-raising activities. Larger departments in towns from a few thousand to up to 100,000 inhabitants also still largely rely on volunteers, yet some are nowadays forced to have one or more de facto career firefighters, employed by the municipality and conscripts who can choose for this compulsory community service instead of the compulsory military service, for daily maintenance duties and to increase the availability of personnel during working hours. This is necessary, as such larger departments usually have to deal with several hundred interventions per year. In addition to volunteers and career departments, some 328 companies are required by law to run their own fire service, which may be staffed by career firefighters and/or part timers who normally work on ordinary jobs in the company. This includes major airports, oil refineries, petro-chemical factories and many other businesses, even hospitals and clinics. Those departments are usually integrated in the contingency plans of the area and may therefore be called upon for reinforcing the volunteer departments outside the company grounds as well.

== Belgium ==
In Belgium, fire departments (Dutch: Brandweerdienst, French: Service d'Incendie) are still mainly funded by the community or local government. However, starting January 1, 2015, the Reformation of Fire Departments and Civil Protection (Hervorming van de Civiele Veiligheid) was complete. From then on, the fire departments will be grouped into 32 'Rescue Zones'. These can be looked at as a corporation that is partly self-reliant, but with funding by the federal government. This reformation was issued after the gas explosion of Ghislenghien in 2004, where it became apparent that equipment and procedures were outdated. Belgian fire fighter academies have begun adapting newer techniques, such as the Swedish techniques for structural firefighting or USA's RIT-procedure (Rapid Intervention Team). One of the first measures of the reformation put into action was the SAH (Snelste Adequate Hulpverlening), meaning that, regardless of territorial boundaries, the fire department who can arrive at the scene the fastest with the most adequate equipment (one driver, one petty officer and four fire fighters) will be the first one to turn out and handle the call until the department who has jurisdiction arrives.

Belgium relies on about 17,000 fire fighters in total, consisting of around 5,000 professional fire fighters (mainly in larger cities) and 12,000 volunteers. Also, almost all EMS interventions in Belgium are carried out by fire departments, more specifically fire fighters who have successfully completed their EMS formation. In some departments fire fighters are obligated to take the EMS formation or even get a permit to drive a truck. Belgium uses a military ranking system, going from fire fighter all the way to colonel—mirroring the French system.

One exception to the Belgian fire departments is Brussels Capital Region. Since the Brussels Regional Government has its own service directing and managing both EMS and fire services, they frequently tend to have other procedures and regulations. For example: in Brussels fire fighters are equipped with orange turn-out gear and officers wear black gear, whereas the rest of Belgium uses this the other way around. The governmental organ responsible for this organisation is called the Fire and Urgent Medical Aid Service (Dutch: DBDMH, Dienst voor Brandbestrijding en Dringende Medische Hulpverlening, French: SIAMU, Service d'Incendie et l'Aide Medicale Urgente)

== Botswana ==
Fire brigades are run at municipality or council level under the Ministry of Local Government and Service Management of the Republic of Botswana. There are 13 fire stations and two sub-fire stations across every city, Town and major village. Fire Service Act 40.1 aimed at saving lives, protection of property and rendering of humanitarian services to the public, extinguishing fires in buildings and offering extrication to all victims of vehicle collisions across all national highways. Most of these fire brigades are run under British Standard and American structures according to the geographic location. There are also influential supporting fire brigades owned by the Civil Aviation Authority (CAA), Defense Force and police. Recently the country was able to train more than 100 firefighters in Australia based only on saving the forests and natures of Botswana run under the Forestry Department.

Almost all fire brigades have divisions similar to Britain:

- Administration
- Operations
- Fire Prevention and Public Education
- Fire Training and Technical Division
- Fire Investigation
- Disaster Management Division

All these divisions are vital in the development of fire brigades in Botswana. There are more than 800 full-time working firefighters and 180 paramedics offering pre-hospital care, serving a population of more than 2 million. As in many developing countries, Botswana's government plays an important role in the purchasing of fire engines and fire equipment.

== Brazil ==
In Brazil, fire services are militarized like some fire departments of France. The "Corpos de bombeiros", or fire fighting corps, is an integral part of the military police. In Brazil military police perform regular police duties throughout the country. This means that in for example the State of São Paulo, people cannot just join the fire brigade. They are first of all policemen, performing the duties of a fire fighter. Each state has its own Military Firefighters Corps (Portuguese: Corpo de Bombeiros Militar). Cities of southern Brazil, with traditional German communities, have had volunteer fire fighters since the nineteenth century.

Over all, fire fighting in Brazil has been undervalued and underfunded by the government, leading to overstretched areas to attend, constant failure of material and shifting of personnel towards police duties.

Private entities that require fire fighters by law hire them from the private market. These fire fighters are trained by private schools. The great level of corruption of private fire fighting schools and consequent incompetence of private fire fighters, or Bombeiro civil, has led towards the Policia militar, or military police, taking control over the accreditation of private fire fighting schools since October 23, 2013.

== Canada ==
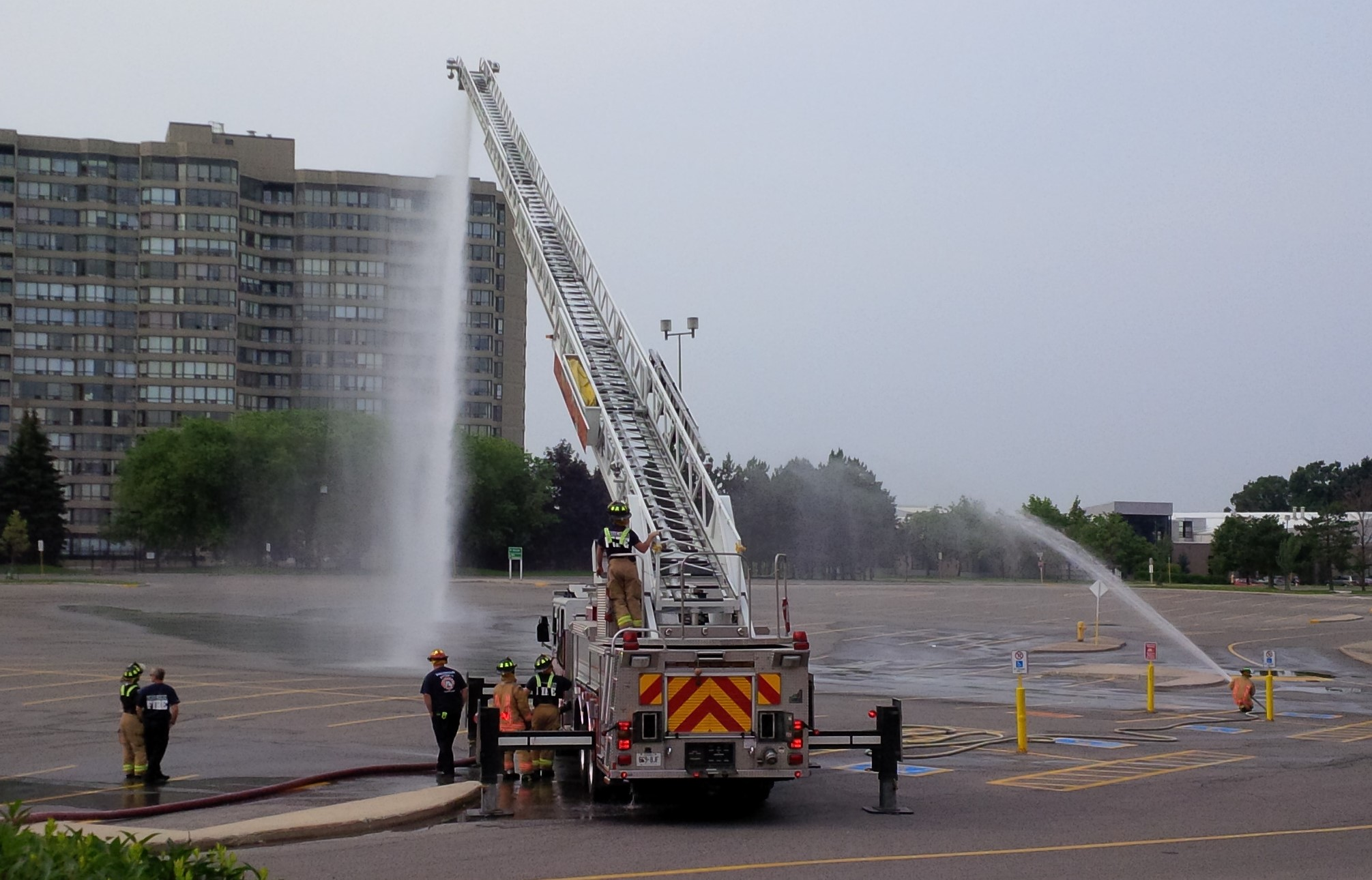
Firefighters train in Canada

Large cities and most towns have full-time fire departments and firefighters (French: Service de sécurité incendie and pompiers in Quebec and other French speaking areas in Canada). Smaller towns and other municipalities may make use of a composite department, consisting of both paid and volunteer firefighters. Some rural municipalities use only volunteer firefighters. All municipal fire departments are publicly operated. Private companies do operate for fire protection on private property (mostly aerospace companies and refineries). Airport fire departments are operated by local airport authorities with assistance from local departments if needed. The Department of National Defence has its own firefighters on Canadian Forces bases for security reasons. Some provinces have designated firefighting crews specially equipped to handle forest fires. Cities and towns along waterways have marine fire capability and the former likely have fireboats. The Canadian Coast Guard provides some marine firefighting capability off Canada's coastline as part of search and rescue operations.

== Chile ==
In Chile, firefighters are called "bomberos". They are volunteers. They also must finance the acquisition, maintenance and operation of their buildings and equipment (including fire trucks) rather than rely upon government allocations. All officers are democratically elected by the volunteers. The government does not finance specialization courses for firefighters. Instead, they have to pay for it on their own. 'Bomberos' is the name given for the firefighters in most Spanish speaking countries ('bomba' is the name of the water pumps).

Founded in 1851, Valparaíso's Fire Department is the oldest of the country. Following it is the Valdivia Fire Department in 1853, Ancud Fire Department in 1856 and Santiago Fire Department established in 1863. Now every city has a fire department, each with its own officers and companies.

Many of the companies were founded by expatriate citizens from European countries such as the Germans, British, Spanish, French and Italians. Many have an online and social media presence as well.

- Santiago Bomberos
- First Santiago Bomberos Company
- Fifth Santiago's Fire Dept. Company
- Tenth Santiago Bomberos Company, "Spain Engine" (Bomba España)
- Fourteenth Santiago Bomberos Company
- Fifteenth Santiago Bomberos Company
- Sixteenth Santiago Bomberos Company
- Eighteenth Santiago Bomberos Company
- Nineteenth Santiago Bomberos Company, in Lo Barnechea
- Twentieth Santiago Bomberos Company

These companies, and the departments upon which they are assigned, are part of one national organization—the Chilean National Firefighters Council (Junta Nacional del Bomberos de Chile), established in 1972.

- Official webpage of the Chilean Firefighters Council

== China ==
Most fire departments (fire brigades) are provincial agencies (e.g. General Fire Brigade of Guangdong) in China, with exceptions in Beijing, Hong Kong and Macau which have their own separate publicly run fire services. Airports in China (including Hong Kong and Macau) also have their own departments. The majority of Chinese firefighters, since 2018, serve as part of the civilianized formations under the Ministry of Emergency Management under the State Council (formerly as paramilitary personnel of the People's Armed Police).

== Costa Rica ==
The Benemérito Cuerpo de Bomberos de Costa Rica (Costa Rica Firefighter Corps) is the institution responsible for firefighting, fire safety and fire prevention. It protects the whole country with 76 firehouses, each with paid and volunteer personnel. Paid firefighters in Costa Rica work 24-hour shifts, while volunteer firefighters must serve at least 40 hours every month.

== Croatia ==
According to the Croatian constitution, fire-fighting is a matter of the local municipalities. Professional and volunteer fire-fighters are equal regarding the fulfilling their duties, but the professional fire-fighting units work on bases of the Law of Public Institutions, and the volunteer fire-fighting units on bases of the Law of Associations of Citizens. An additional four fire-fighting intervention-units work in four coastal counties in Dalmatia, and all fire-fighting units are commanded during the summer by the Center in Divulje near Split, all part of the National Directorate for protection and safety.

Specific for Croatia is also the engagement of 1.000 season fire-fighters and additional fire-fighting units on islands to protect them from wildland fires in summer.

Fire-fighting interventions are carried out by:

- 1835 volunteer fire fighting units in municipalities and cities
- 56 volunteer industrial fire fighting units
- 61 public city fire fighting units (professional)
- 34 professional industrial fire fighting units
- 4 intervention units of the Ministry of internal affairs
- Special fire-fighting forces and forces of the anti-fire escadrille of the Ministry of Defense (six Canadairs CL 415, six Air-tractors 802, a Fire Boss, and helicopters of the type Mi-8 and 117-S of the Croatian Air Force)

== Cuba ==
Firefighting in Cuba is operated by the Cuban Fire Corps (Cuerpo de Bomberos de Cuba), a subset of the Ministry of the Interior (MININT). Cuba has both professional and volunteer departments. Many firefighters are conscripts assigned as part of their military service, and cannot defy such orders under penalty of law. Cuban fire departments frequently suffer from lack of water, equipment, and fuel.

== Denmark ==
In Denmark fire fighting is, by law, a municipal task. Every municipal council are responsible for providing fire fighting and rescue services. The only requirements according to the law for this fire service are that the vehicles have to be crewed with the necessary personnel for the task at hand and they have to be on the way within five minutes after the alarm has come in.

Every municipality has to perform a risk analysis and based on this maintain a competent fire fighting service. The fire department itself can be run as any one of the following:

- A public fire department managed and run by the municipality either full-time or part-time
- A volunteer fire department contracted by the municipality
- Arrangement with neighbouring municipalities
- Outsourced to a private company (e.g. Falck)
- Contract with the government run Danish Emergency Management Agency (DEMA), which has stations in five locations scattered over the country

All fire fighters (brandmænd) have the same training, no matter if they are volunteers, full-time professionals or public or private employees. The training takes five weeks and can be taken in several fire fighting schools all over the country.

== Finland ==
Finnish firefighters (palomiehet) are organised into professional, half-ordinary and voluntary fire brigades. Professional firefighters in Finland graduate from one of the two firefighting schools in Finland. Firefighters in half-ordinary and voluntary fire brigades are trained volunteers.

There are approximately 85,000 emergency missions a year in Finland, of which fires account for 18%. According to the Ministry of the Interior, Finnish fire brigades extinguish around 12,000 fires every year. Voluntary fire brigades have a remarkable role in the fire rescue service and cover a large part of Finland's area.

== France ==
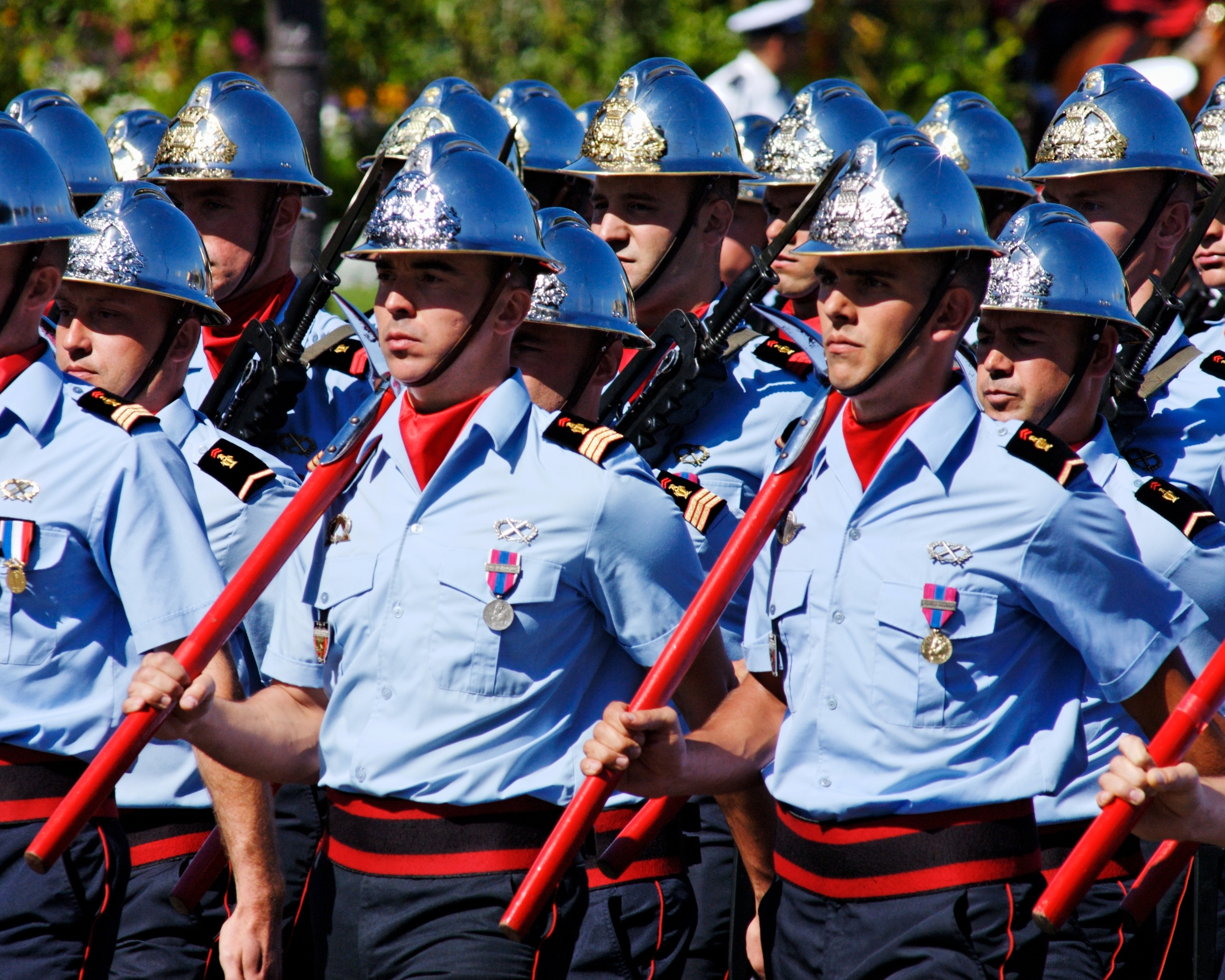
The Paris Fire Brigade is a French Army unit which serves as the fire service for Paris and certain sites of national strategic importance.

French firefighters are called Sapeurs-Pompiers, and reflecting the rural nature of much of the country (wide areas with low density of population), the Volunteer Fire brigade (SPV, sapeur-pompier volontaire), with over 190,000 firefighters is the largest firefighting force in France. In addition to being called out from work to attend an incident, they may be on standby at firestations outside their working hours; the intervention and attending hours are paid by the session. The volunteer fire brigade is also a way to promote the culture of civil defense and of solidarity amongst the population. The Professional Fire Brigade (SPP, sapeur-pompier professionnel) numbers over 30,000 firefighters, employed by the départements and working in shifts. In some towns there is a mixture of professionals and volunteers, in others only one or the other.

In Paris and Marseille, the fire brigades are made up of military personnel, but under the control of the Ministry of the Interior in a similar way to the Gendarmes. The Paris Fire Brigade (BSPP) has around 7,000 firefighters, and the Marseille Marine Fire Battalion (BMPM) has over 2,000.

French firefighters tackle over 3.6 million incidents each year:

- 10% fires,
- 10% traffic accidents (freeing the casualties and prehospital care as first responders),
- 59% other help to people (mainly prehospital care as first responders),
- 21% other incidents (gas escapes, stuck elevators, etc.).

With the SAMU (French EMS), they are the backbone of the French civil defense.

== Germany ==
German fire brigades (Feuerwehr) are organized on a town/village basis, with each town having at least one brigade. In Germany there are about 25,000 local brigades—24,000 volunteer fire brigades (Freiwillige Feuerwehr), 800 private fire brigades with public accreditation (Werkfeuerwehr), which mostly protect large industrial complexes or airports, many private fire brigades with no public accreditation (Betriebsfeuerwehr), and 100 public fire brigades (Berufsfeuerwehr) compulsory by law for large towns and cities. However, public brigades are often supported by and cooperate with volunteer brigades. Some volunteer brigades also have a small core of full-time firefighters paid by local community funds. In very rare cases private individuals can be compelled to participate in a compulsory fire department, if there are not enough volunteer fire fighters available. Volunteer fire brigades are usually structured in three brigade categories (Grundausstattung, Stützpunktfeuerwehren, Schwerpunktfeuerwehren) depending on size and level of equipment. Many German fire brigades not only provide firefighters, they operate emergency medical services as well. They are estimated to have a total of 1,300,000 active members.

== Hong Kong ==
The Hong Kong Fire Services Department (HKFSD) not only has firefighters, but ambulance crews. As of 14 May 2005, there are 8,675 uniformed personnel (including ambulancemen/ambulancewomen) and 676 civilian members. Fire Services also provides fire services to Hong Kong International Airport. Government Flying Service provides aerial fire fighting capabilities.

The head of HKFSD is called the Director but not the Commissioner. Assisted by the Deputy Director, the Director of the HKFSD is the head of three Operational Fire Commands: Hong Kong, Kowloon and N.T. (i.e. The three Districts). Each of the Commands is under the control of the Chief Fire Officer (CFO). In reality, there is one additional Command: The Heartquarters(HQ), which is under control of the CFO(HQ).

See here for more information.

== Hungary ==
Some 7000 firemen are serving in Hungary at fire brigade unites founded by Ödön Széchenyi. Most of them are professional municipal firemen who are paid from month to month for their services. They generally work at 24/48-hour shifts, occasionally at 24/72. The second largest number of firemen can be found in the volunteer fire brigades. In Hungary volunteer fire brigades are common organisations established by a local government and a firemen's association. The third section are the units employed in the industrial establishments. These units may be employed full-time or part-time. Their regulation and order of duty (in case of full-time employed) is according to the professional municipal firemen and the level of safety more specialized to the characteristics of the establishment. One of the biggest establishment fire brigade units in the country, world-famous through its firefighting practices, is the FER Fire Brigade Ltd., operated and sustained by MOL Co. petrol industry in Százhalombatta.

== India ==
In India municipalities are bound by law to have a fire brigade and participate in a regional fire service. Each city has its own fire brigade. All the industrial corporations also have their own firefighting service. Each airport and seaport has its own firefighting units. The main functions of firefighting service in India are provision of fire protection and of services during emergencies, such as building collapses, drowning cases, gas leakage, oil spillage, road and rail accidents, bird and animal rescues, fallen trees, appropriate action during natural calamities, and providing consultancy in implementing fire protection and fire safety in industries and high rise buildings and other buildings having special fire risks, etc.

== Indonesia ==
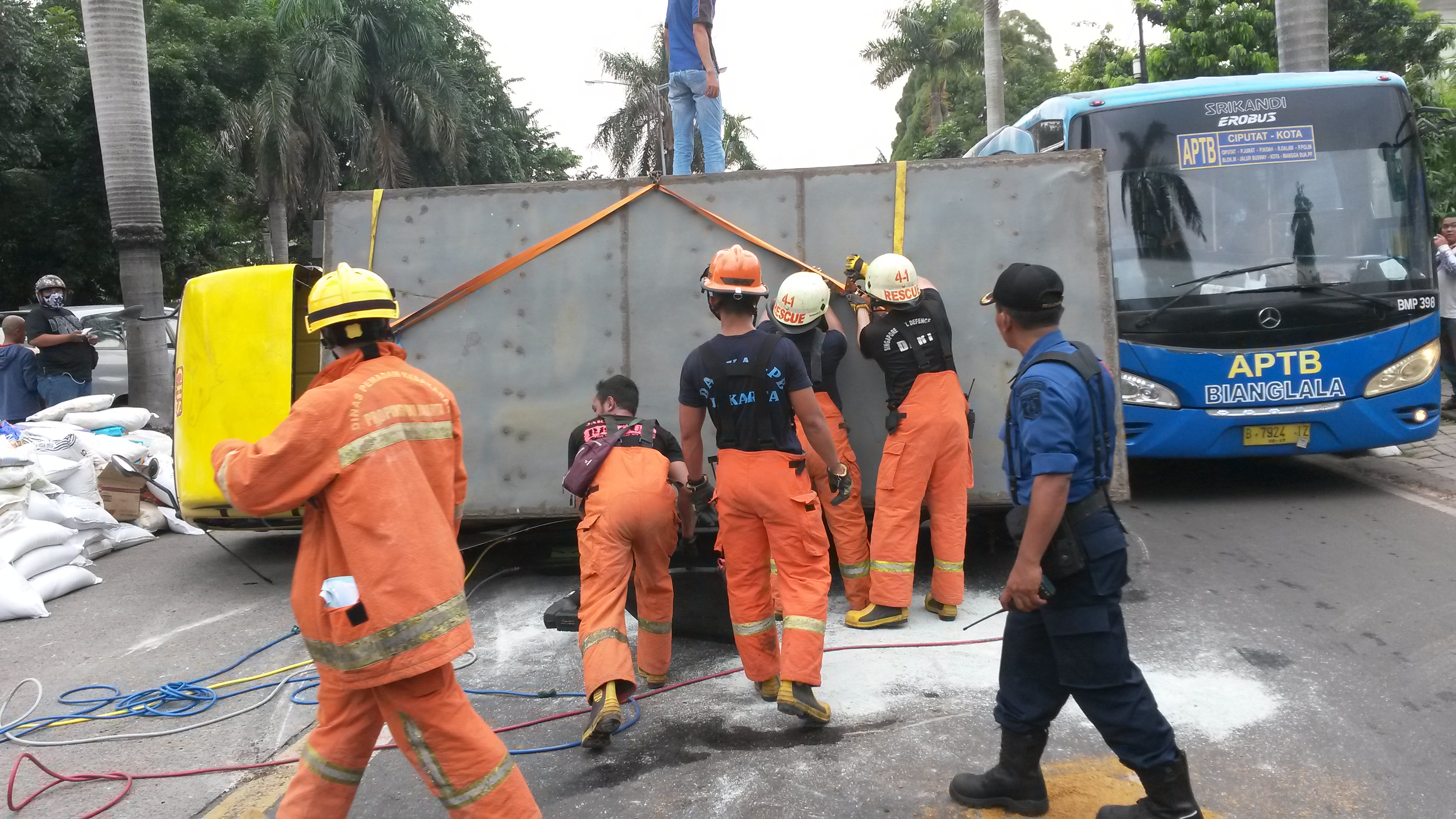
Indonesian fire fighters handling a traffic accident in Jakarta

Firefighting units in Indonesia (known locally as Pemadam Kebakaran shortened "Damkar" or "PMK") fall under the control of the provincial, city, regency and municipal district/township governments and under the supervision of the national Ministry of Home Affairs. They are formations that report to local chief executives through the office of the Regional Government Secretary.

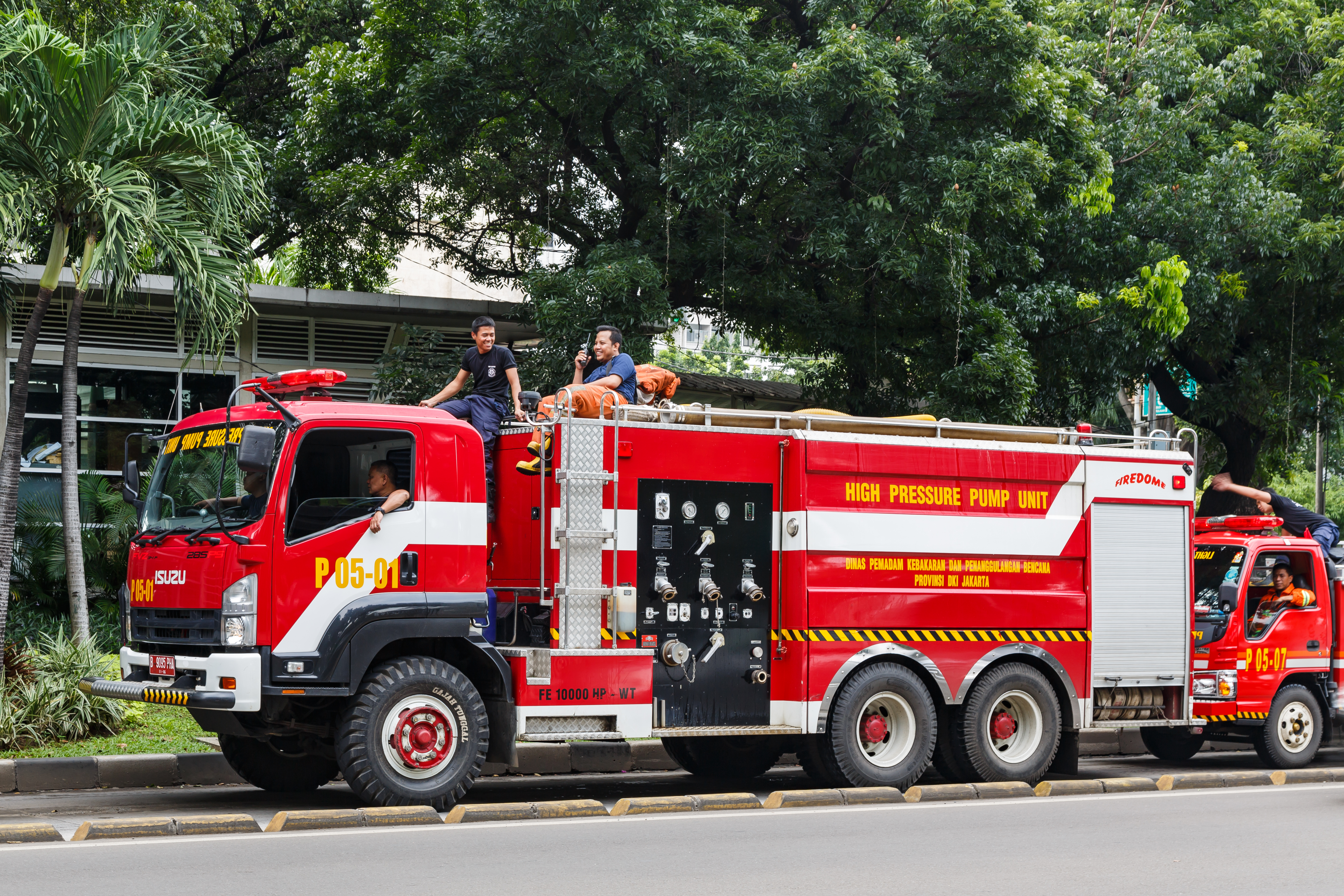
A fire Engine in Jakarta with some fire fighters on top

Firefighters in Indonesia respond to various calls from the public, not only responding to fire but also for rescue as they are tasked for "Fire and Rescue" including fire prevention activities. Such calls can be for removing trapped rings on a person's finger, evacuating snakes, until rescuing trapped cats are also conducted by firefighters in Indonesia. Indonesian firefighters are capable to conduct any rescue operations, from low to high intensity rescue operations.

Firefighters in Indonesia are not full-timers, they are usually contracted for a number of years under the regional government, and if the performance of the personnel is satisfying, then the contract can be extended, some senior firefighters have been working for more than 20 years in the service.

== Republic of Ireland ==
In the Republic of Ireland, fire services are provided on a county-by-county, local authority basis. Apart from a small number of full-time brigades, most fire services operate a retained duty system, where firefighters are alerted to the fire station by a pager/alerter system. Retained firefighters are typically on call 24 hours a day, 7 days a week apart from pre-arranged leave. Management and fire prevention duties (inspections, building assessment etc.) are carried out by a small number of senior officers in each county, usually between 4 and 10 depending on size and population.

An Irish fire brigade attends a wide variety of incidents, spanning from fire calls to flooding incidents to extrication of trapped victims at road incidents. This means that a wide variety of equipment is carried on the first-turnout appliance (ladders, hose, breathing apparatus and extrication equipment as well as a vehicle mounted pump and an 1800-litre water tank), whilst more specialised vehicles—water tankers, rescue tenders, high reach appliances etc.—are stationed at strategic locations. In Dublin the Dublin Fire Brigade also responds to EMS calls with firefighters being also trained as paramedics meaning they also operate ambulances in the Dublin area.

At border areas, such as Counties Donegal and Louth, local agreements are in place with the Northern Ireland Fire and Rescue Service in relation to attending incidents.

== Israel ==
In Israel, the Israel Fire and Rescue Services is the sole authority in control of firefighting across the entire country. It also provides rescue services for victims of terrorism, car crashes, and dangerous substance spillages. There are 24 metro regions with central major fire stations along with smaller, supplemental stations in neighboring villages and cities. The Israel fire and rescue services consists of about 1,200 paid, professional firefighters and 200–400 volunteers. Israel also has 6 Hazardous Materials units, although almost all Israeli firefighters are certified at hazardous materials response and handling, many of them receiving training in world-class facilities in the Netherlands.

== Italy ==
The vigili del fuoco, literally the Firewatchers, (official name Corpo nazionale dei vigili del fuoco) (CNVVF, National Fire-watchers' Corps) is Italy's institutional agency for fire and rescue service. It is part of the Ministry of Interior's Dipartimento dei Vigili del Fuoco, del Soccorso Pubblico e della Difesa Civile (Department of Fire Watch, Public Rescue and Civil(ian) Protection). The corps' task is to provide safety for people, animals and property, and to give technical assistance to industries and fire prevention advice. It also ensures public safety in terrorist emergencies such as chemical, bacteriological, radiological and nuclear attacks.

== Lithuania ==
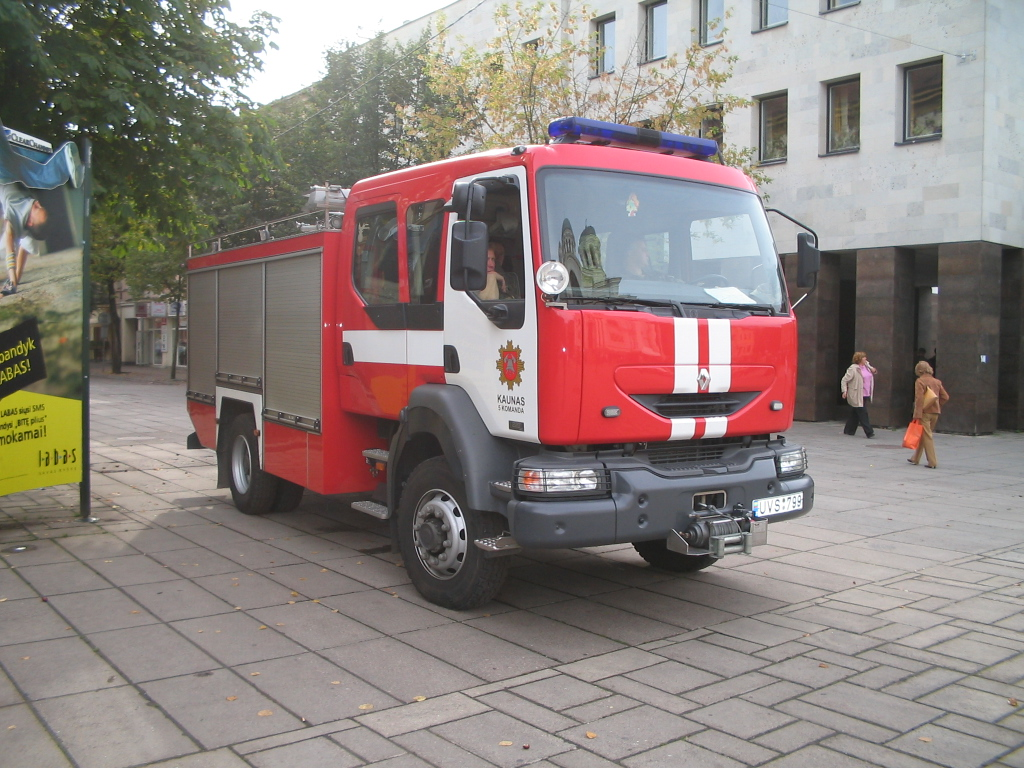
Firefighter vehicle in Kaunas, Lithuania

In Lithuania firefighters are called "Ugniagesiai gelbėtojai" and may be summoned by dialing to 112 (Lithuania's main emergency phone). Most of the biggest Lithuania cities are equipped with the newest gear and technique. Lithuania firefighters vehicles are mostly made in Europe, like: Renault, Mercedes-Benz or MAN, however some smaller towns still have GAZ vehicles from Soviet times.

== Japan ==
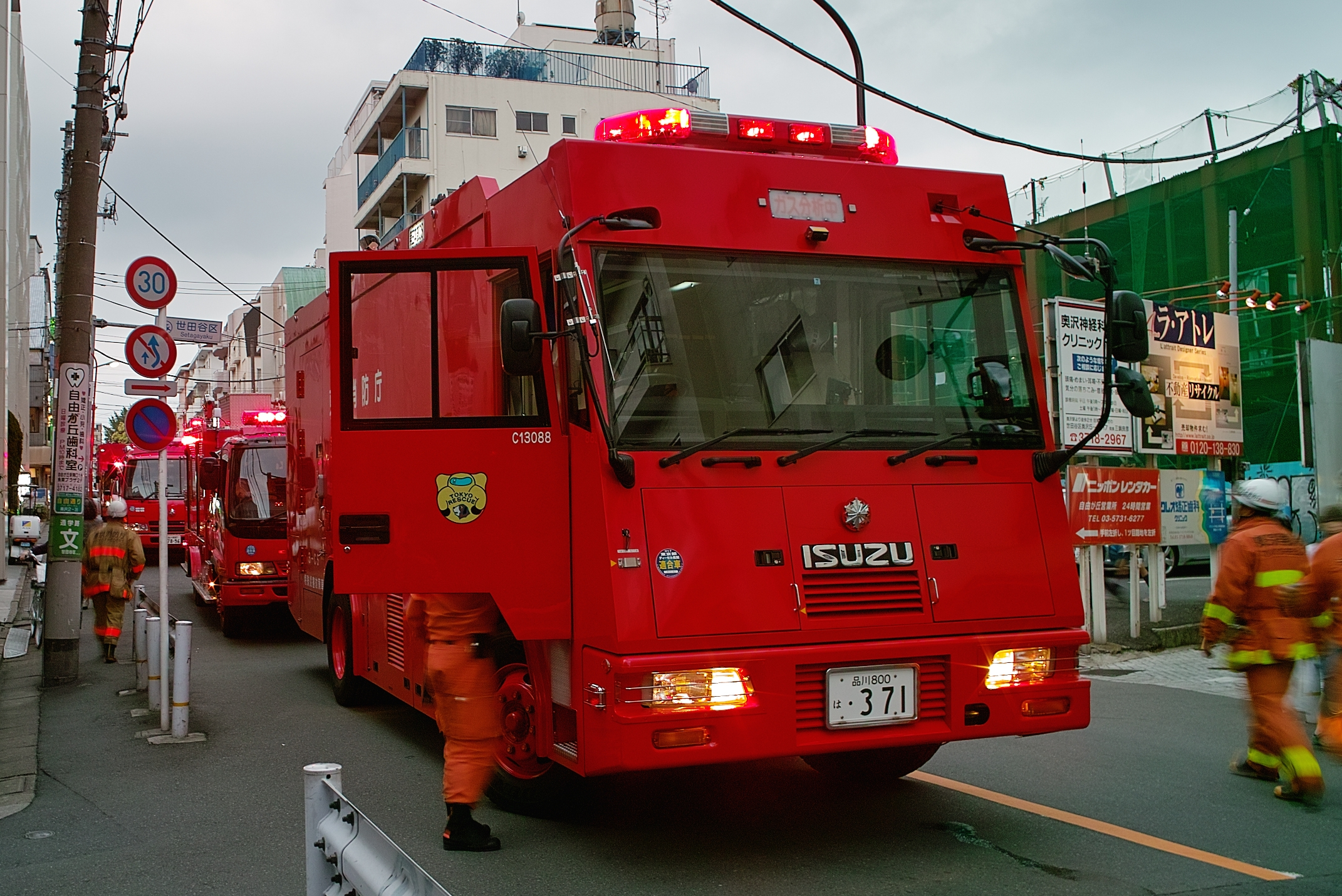
Vehicles of the Tokyo Fire Department

Japan's first fire service was founded in 1629 during the Edo era, and was called hikeshi. During the Meiji Period, when Japan opened its doors to the West, the hikeshi was merged into the police department. During this time period, pumps were imported and domestically produced, and modern firefighting strategies were introduced. In 1948, after World War II, a municipality fire service system was established.

Today, fire services are organized on a city/town/village basis. There are 894 fire headquarters (消防本部) and 3,598 volunteer fire corps (消防団). These have a total of 155,000 active career firefighters and 21,000 vehicles with 4,800 fire houses; 920,000 volunteer firefighters share an additional 51,000 trucks. Overall supervision is under the Ministry of Internal Affairs and Communications.

== Macau ==
Like Hong Kong, Macau has their own fire department, Corpo de Bombeiros de Macau and trained like their Western counterparts. The fire department also provides fire and rescue services to Macau International Airport.

== The Netherlands ==
In The Netherlands municipalities are bound by law to have a fire brigade and participate in a regional fire service. The local brigade is responsible for responding to all incidents; the regional fire service provides a control center and operates the special vehicles. There are 25 "safety Regions". These regions' boundaries are the same for fire, police and ambulance service and most regions have a combined control center. The regions are self-contained and can cope with most incidents, in extreme circumstances other regions will provide assistance. All emergency services rely on a single modern digital national communications network based on the Tetra standard. This makes mutual assistance between regions simple to coordinate. Unlike some other countries the ambulance service is completely separated from the fire service, although the control center is usually shared.

About 75% of all firefighters are volunteers, the rest are career firefighters. Although most firefighters in the Netherlands are volunteers, they all get paid. Volunteers get a small amount of money to compensate the costs, because when called upon, they have to leave their jobs and take risks.

The appearance of emergency vehicles is standardized in order to keep them optimally recognizable for other road users. The basic first response unit is an engine with a crew of six: a commander, a driver, an attack-team and a water supply team. Aerial ladder or tower trucks are dispatched when needed. Because it is impractical to build trucks to carry all the possible types, all regional fire services across the nation use a standardized type of containers. These containers are transported by special trucks. The containers are built for specific purposes. There are containers with command and control, hydraulic submersible pumps (up to 8000 litres per minute), hoseline (up to 3 km of 150-mm hose), watertank, foamtank, decontamination, Hazmat, breathing apparatus, technical rescue, etc.

== New Zealand ==
In New Zealand, fire protection services are overseen by the New Zealand Fire Service Commission. The Commission ensures coverage through all jurisdictions nationwide and reports to the Ministry of Internal Affairs.

Fire protection for urban and peri-urban areas is provided by the New Zealand Fire Service. This nationwide organisation was established by the Fire Service Act 1975 from the various urban fire brigades in existence at the time. The Fire Service Act nationalised the service and provided the statutory authority required to fight and prevent fire and to respond to other emergencies, including hazardous substance incidents and motor-vehicle collisions. There are mixture of career fire districts, covering major towns and cities, and volunteer fire brigades, covering smaller towns and communities. Each district and brigade is headed by a Chief Fire Officer (CFO), who report via their Area Commander and Regional Commander to the National Commander, the chief operational firefighter of the entire Fire Service. The National Commander reports to the Chief Executive who in turn reports to the NZFSC. The roles of National Commander and Chief Executive may be performed by one person if suitably qualified for both roles.

The NZFS has a significant role in Urban Search and Rescue and contributes key resources to New Zealand's three USAR teams, based in Auckland, Palmerston North and Christchurch. They also provide first-response medical services as a backup to local Ambulance Services, especially in rural areas.

In rural areas the National Rural Fire Authority is responsible for providing fire response, as covered by the Forest and Rural Fires Act 1977. Rural Fire Brigades are operated by City and District Councils, where each District appoints a Rural Fire Officer who reports to the National Rural Fire Officer, who reports to the NZFSC. Other participants in the New Zealand Fire Service Commission are the New Zealand Defence Force (responsible for fires on Military land) and the Department of Conservation (Responsible for fires in National Parks). Privately owned forestry areas are responsible for providing their own firefighting means.

There is much cooperation between the various firefighting resources in New Zealand, but it is recognised that current legislation is not very flexible—there are loopholes in the areas of funding and legal liability, among others. The Department of Internal Affairs is currently in the process of reviewing legislation for Fire and Rescue services in New Zealand, with a view to rewriting both the Fire Service Act and the Forest and Rural Fires Act.

Specialist forest fire fighters from New Zealand are often requested to provide assistance at wildfire events in Australia and the United States, where their skills in incident management are utilised within the Incident Command System.

== Norway ==
Norway has 433 municipalities and 375 Fire and Rescue Services.

Municipal Fire and Rescue Services Resources - 2003 • 2,000 Full-time Fire Fighters • 8,700 Part-time Fire Fighters • Included in these figures are: - 4,500 trained for aggressive Fire Fighting - (1,700 also trained for fighting accidents involving chemical) • 820 pumpers • 70 ladders • 300 tankers • 135 Rescue vehicles • On a rental or hire basis helicopter designated for forest fire fighting

Emergency call centres • 110 – FIRE: 24 call centres • 112 – POLICE: 27 call centres • 113 – MEDICAL EMERGENCIES: 40 call centres • 1412 – 1 call center (in writing) for the deaf and hearing impaired (110, 112 and 113).

== Panama ==
The idea for a volunteer fire brigade in Panama began in the 1870s and was officially inaugurated on November 28, 1887. Paid firefighters did not appear until May 1, 1909. Fire protection services are divided into regional zones each with its own independent institution. They are overseen by a council of zone directors for the fire departments of the entire country. Zone 1 encompasses Panama City and its suburbs. It has about 300 permanent, paid firefighters and twice as many volunteers.

== Paraguay ==
The Paraguayan Firefighting Corps, established in 1978, serves as the national firefighting service. It is Latin America's youngest national fire service, tasked to provide firefighting, disaster and accident rescue duties.

== Peru ==
Founded in 1953, the General Corps of Volunteer Firefighters of Peru (Cuerpo General de Bomberos Voluntarios del Perú, CGBVP) serves as the official firefighting service of the country. It is the central authority for firefighting in Peru. With more than hundreds of municipal and city level departments the CGBVP provides the necessary training and equipment for these fire units.

== Philippines ==
Firefighting and rescue services in the Philippines are, since 1991, handled by the Bureau of Fire Protection of the Department of the Interior and Local Government. As of 2023, the BFP lacks 19,160 firefighters.

== Portugal ==
In Portugal, volunteer fire departments are established in every town: even the biggest Portuguese cities, have volunteer firefighters besides a career fire service. Well-trained and well-equipped fire departments are based in every Portuguese municipality. Aerial firefighting is widely used, especially in the forest. Video-based fire surveillance and remote monitoring systems for real-life application are used, besides fire surveillance outposts placed in strategic locations. Legislation regarding the installation and maintenance of fire detection and control in buildings is enforced. Like all the other EU member states, in which under a European Union civil-protection programme, the European Commission manages requests for help with a natural disaster and keeps tabs on what resources are available in which member state, Portugal is ready to offer support in firefighting operations in the European Union.

== Singapore ==
The Singapore Civil Defence Force (abbreviation: SCDF; Chinese: 新加坡民防部队) is the main agency in charge of the provision of emergency services in the Republic of Singapore during peacetime and emergency.

A uniformed organization under the purview of the Ministry of Home Affairs, the SCDF provides ambulance, firefighting and emergency response services in Singapore. It also plays a major role in the Republic's disaster relief operations.

== Slovenia ==
The organization of firefighting in Slovenia has many similarities with firefighting in Austria, because of the historical influence. The emphasis is on volunteer fire departments which are non-profit organization by the law. As of 2008, there are 1295 volunteer fire departments and 68 industrial voluntary fire departments with more than 60,000 voluntary firefighters which represent the backbone of firefighting service in Slovenia. The activity of the volunteer fire departments is financially supported by local community, but fire departments are also allowed to collect private donations. The voluntary fire departments are also heavily involved in community activities, especially in smaller towns and villages. The general organization of voluntary firefighting service is named Gasilska zveza Slovenije.

In addition to voluntary firefighters there are also 34 career fire departments (13 of them provide public fire service in bigger cities, the rest of them on main airports and big industrial facilities, including power plants) with more than 900 firefighters. These professional firefighters are financially supported by the employers (in industry and at the airports), but public fire departments are supported by local municipalities and the Slovenian Ministry of Defense.

Both voluntary and professional firefighters must undergo a formal training to become qualified for the firefighting duty.

== Spain ==
Fire brigades in Spain are different in each autonomous community with the exception of Barcelona and Madrid which have their own brigades.

The Fire Brigade of Valencia is famous for having created an NGO called Bomberos Sin Fronteras (Firefighters Without Borders) which helps in any natural disaster that could happen anywhere in the world. There is also a Firefighters Museum, in Alcoy, (Alicante).

== Sri Lanka ==
The fire brigades in Sri Lanka are based in large cities such as Colombo, Kandy, etc. These units come under the control of each municipal council. Some towns have smaller units. All major airports and harbors maintain their own fire brigades with specialized units and training.

== Switzerland ==
In Switzerland, it is common for compulsory fire service duties to be required of both men and women, whether or not they are Swiss. Most fire services in Switzerland are so called Militia Fire Brigades (Miliz-Feuerwehr). Militia firefighters normally pursue other professions, and have active duty only during exercises and missions. In the case of an emergency, the first response is completed by a group of specially-trained police officers. The militia fire brigade arrives as soon as possible. In special situations (major events, demonstrations, etc.) the fire brigade provides a standby service. Currently 95,000 men and women serve as firefighters in 1.500 fire brigades (Feuerwehrkorps), Only 1.200 of them are professional firefighters, organized as plant fire brigades or a unit of a larger city.

Compulsory fire service exists in 21 out of 26 Swiss cantons. Exceptions include for example, the canton of Zurich, and in all places where professional fire brigades exist. If a fire brigade cannot find enough volunteers, it can carry out forced recruitment. These drafts are not popular, because the recruited firefighters are generally less motivated. Anyone who rejects service must pay a fire service exemption tax.

== United Kingdom ==
Fire and rescue services (FRS) in England are organised on a metropolitan or county basis, mainly owing to the reorganisation of the counties in 1974. In Scotland and Wales they are on a regional basis, with eight and three FRS respectively. Northern Ireland and, since 2013, Scotland have single brigades, the Northern Ireland Fire and Rescue Service and the Scottish Fire and Rescue Service respectively. The term fire brigade is largely historical with only a few FRS, including the London Fire Brigade keeping it in use. The gradual change to the term fire and rescue service has been reinforced by new legislation including the Fire and Rescue Services Act 2004 which mostly applies to England and Wales. The equivalent legislation in Scotland is the Fire (Scotland) Act 2005. In rural areas, there are often fire stations staffed by part-time retained firefighters. In addition there are a number of independent fire services, such as the Peterborough volunteers, the Downe House School brigade and those run by large industrial concerns. As well as responding to emergencies, UK FRS also have a legal obligation by various Acts of Parliament covering different parts of the UK, to respond to any emergency, which can pose a threat to life, and the environment. Dealing with Urban Search and Rescue incidents was incorporated into English law in 2007, FRS are required by law to deal with An emergency involving the collapse of a building or other structure.

== United States ==
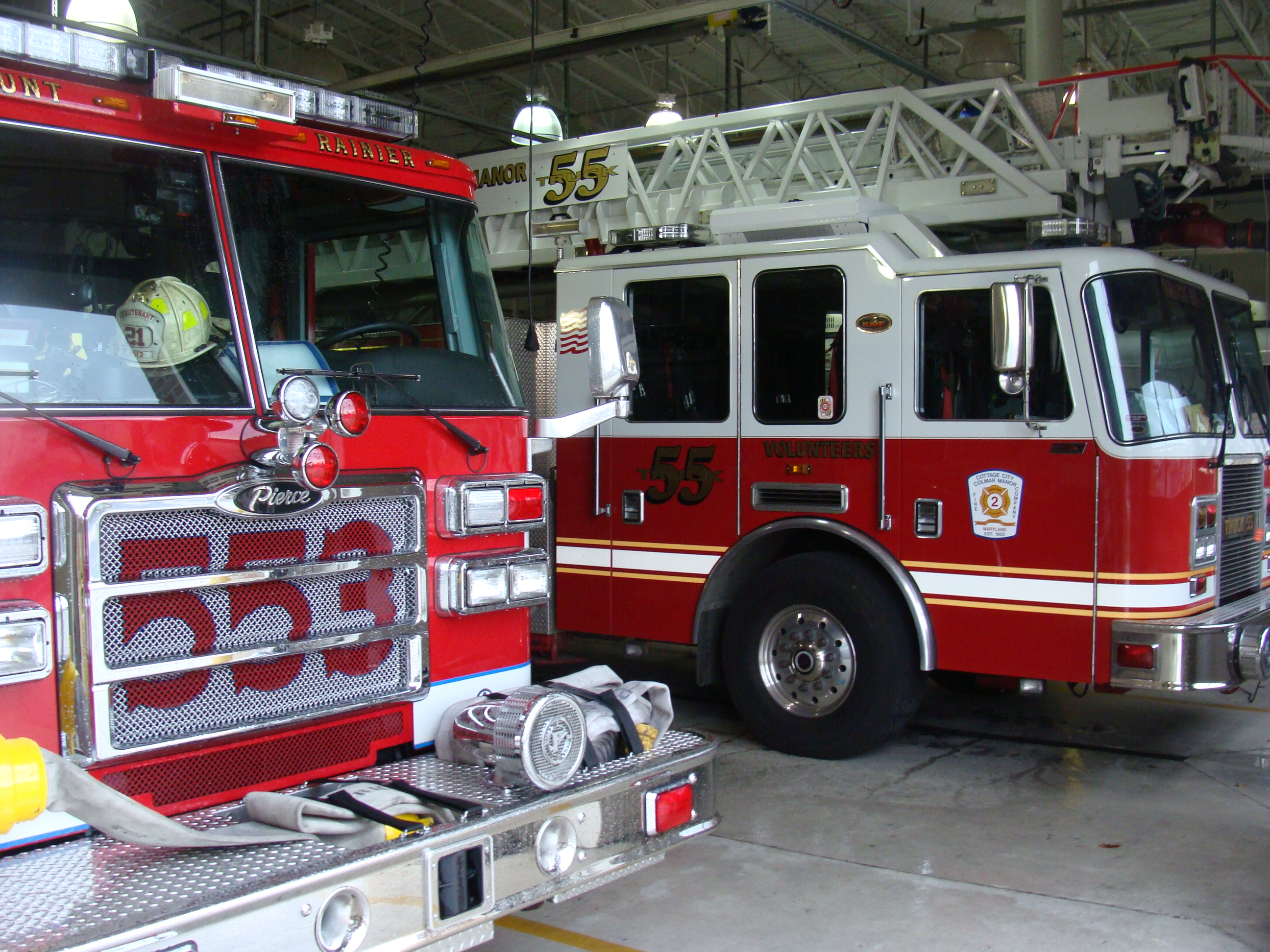
Prince George's County Fire Department Engine 553 in the foreground and Ladder 55 in the background parked at a firehouse in Brentwood, Maryland

U.S. firefighters work under the auspices of fire departments (also commonly called fire protection districts, fire divisions, fire companies, fire bureaus, and fire-rescue). These departments are generally organized as local or county government subsidiaries, special-purpose district entities or not-for-profit corporations. They may be funded by the parent government, through millage, fees for services, fundraising or charitable contributions. Some state governments and the federal government operate fire departments to protect their wildlands, e.g., California Department of Forestry and Fire Protection (CAL FIRE), New Jersey Forest Fire Service, USDA Forest Service – Fire and Aviation Management (see also Smokejumper). Many military installations, major airports and large industrial facilities also operate their own fire departments.

== Vatican City ==
The world's smallest country maintains a full-time professional fire service, under the authority of the Directorate for Security Services and Civil Defence. The original Guardie dei Fuoco, established in 1820, was a military fire service, and part of the armed forces of the Papal States. This was reformed in 1941 into the Corpo dei vigili del fuoco dello Stato della Città del Vaticano or Corps of Firefighters of the Vatican City State. The corps has its headquarters at Belvedere Courtyard in the Vatican City, and maintains full-time cover throughout the year on a rotational shift pattern, staffed by 30 full-time firefighters. There are four principal appliances, plus a number of support vehicles.

== Venezuela ==
In Venezuela, there are several types of fire brigades, which are often divided by jurisdiction. The two main types of fire brigades here are State or Municipal brigades, with many volunteer units existing as well. One of the most important paid fire departments in Venezuela is the Bomberos Metropolitanos de Caracas (Caracas Metropolitan Firefighters).

A fourth type, the University brigade, takes care of any emergency situation on a university campus. These brigades are a rapidly growing trend in Venezuela. An example of such a force is Cuerpo de Bomberos Universitarios de la Universidad Central de Venezuela (Venezuela Central University's Firefighter Brigade), which has more than 40 years of service and combined experience. There are new institutions growing in other universities, such as the Cuerpo de Bomberos Voluntarios de la Universidad Simón Bolívar (Simón Bolívar University's Volunteer Firefighter Brigade).

All these firefighting units report directly to the Ministry of Interior and Justice through the National Directorate for Civil Protection and Firefighting.

== Vietnam ==
The Vietnam Firefighting Force (Vietnamese: Lực lượng Phòng cháy và Chữa cháy Việt Nam) is a component part of Vietnam People's Public Security. It includes 4 subbranches: Volunteer Fire Militia (Dân phòng Phòng cháy và Chữa cháy), Regular Fire Service (Phòng cháy và Chữa cháy Cơ sở), Special Fire Service (Phòng cháy và Chữa cháy Chuyên ngành) and Fire Police (Cảnh sát Phòng cháy và Chữa cháy).

Vietnam Firefighting Force has important roles in managing, organizing and commanding firefighting and civil defense duties within Vietnam.

Vietnam Firefighting Force was established on 27 September 1961. As a part of the VPPS, it falls under the command of the Ministry of Public Security (Vietnam).

Each province of Vietnam has a Fire Office and each local area has a Fire Station under the Provincial Fire Office.

== See also ==
- Bushfire
- Country Fire Service
- FDNY
- Fire/Burglar alarms
- Fire apparatus
- Fire Services Department (Hong Kong)
- Fire station
- Fireboat
- Fire Museum
- Fire safety
- Firefighter
- Glossary of firefighting equipment
- Glossary of firefighting terms
- Glossary of wildland fire terms
- History of firefighting
- Incident Command System
- International Association of Wildland Fire
- LAFD
- List of historic fires
- Leatherhead (helmet)
- Smokejumper
- Smoke detector
- Water tender
- Firemen's Association of the State of New York
- Women in firefighting
