= Susan G. Conard =

American scientist and wildfire researcher

- Education: Antioch College (BA); University of California, Davis (MS, PhD)
- Awards: Fellow of American Association for the Advancement of Science
- Scientific career
- Fields: Carbon sequestration; Fire ecology
- Workplaces: Oregon State University; United States Forest Service; George Mason University

Susan G. Conard is an American scientist whose expertise focuses on wildland fires in Northern California and Taiga. During the 1980s and 1990s, Conard worked as a research and project leader for the United States Forest Service, publishing pieces on fire management and carbon sequestration. She is currently the editor for the International Journal of Wildland Fire.

== Education ==
Conard earned a BA in environmental studies from Antioch College in Yellow Springs, Ohio. She then went on to earn an MS and PhD in plant ecology at the University of California, Davis. Conard was a postdoctoral researcher at Oregon State University, where she launched a career focused on the carbon cycle and wildland forests.

== Career and research ==
From 1983–1996, Conard worked as a researcher and project leader for the United States Forest Service. During this time, she conducted research on the effects of fires in Southern California and carbon sequestration in boreal forests. She went on to work as the Forest Service National Program Leader until 2008. Currently, she is an affiliate faculty member at George Mason University and an Emeritus ecologist for the Rocky Mountain Research Station. She holds the position as editor in chief for the International Journal of Wildland Fire.

Conard has published over 80 peer-reviewed papers. Her focuses include burn effects from wildfires, carbon cycling and sequestration, and remote sensing applications as they relate to climate change In her most cited publication, Conard discusses the implications of forest fires in Siberia's boreal forests. Comparing them to Canada's boreal forests, Conard and her fellow authors discovered that in 1998, Siberian forests accounted for 14–20% of total carbon emissions from forest fires. This percentage is due to increase as temperatures rise—resulting in longer and more severe burns. Conard and her co-authors worry that the out of control burning of boreal forests will have huge impacts on carbon sequestration and atmospheric carbon levels going forward.

Conard is currently studying the succession of pine forests as a result of wildfires. She is a research scientist at George Mason University.

== Publications ==
- Conard, Susan G.; Sukhinin, Anatoly I.; Stocks, Brian J.; Cahoon, Donald R.; Davidenko, Eduard P.; Ivanova, Galina A. (2002). "Determining Effects of Area Burned and Fire Severity on Carbon Cycling and Emissions in Siberia". Climatic Change. 55 (1/2): 197–211. Bibcode:2002ClCh...55..197C. doi:10.1023/a:1020207710195. ISSN 0165-0009. S2CID 154705876.
- Wildfire in Russian boreal forests—Potential impacts of fire regime characteristics on emissions and global carbon balance estimates, Environmental Pollution, 1997
- Estimating fire emissions and disparities in boreal Siberia (1998–2002), Journal of Geophysical Research: Atmospheres, 2004

== Awards and achievements ==
- Fellow of the American Association for the Advancement of Science, February 2007
- Keynote speaker in the VIII International Conference on Forest Fire Research in 2018
- Mentioned in 2018 article "Recognizing Women Leaders in Fire Science" for her work in the field
- Distinguished Service Award, International Association of Wildland Fire (2021)
