= Stop, drop and roll =

Fire safety technique

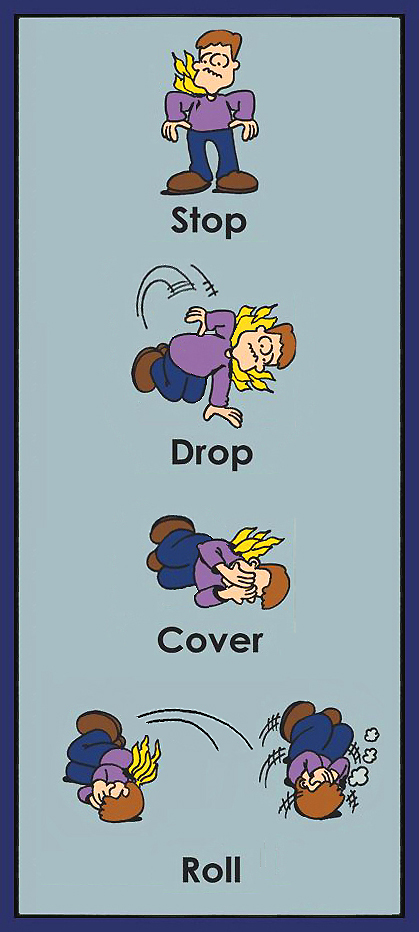
Graphic used by the Trenton Fire Department: the steps of the stop, drop, cover and roll method

Stop, drop and roll is a simple fire safety technique taught to children, emergency service personnel and industrial workers as a component of training in some of the anglophone world, particularly in North America. The method involves three steps that fire victims should follow if their clothing catches fire, to try to extinguish it. Such attempt can be especially useful when there are flames on the back, or too much fire.

== Procedure ==
Stop, drop and roll consists of three components:

1. Stop – The fire-affected person stops, ceasing any movement which may fan the flames or hamper those attempting to put the fire out.
2. Drop – The fire-affected person drops to an appropriate piece of ground, lying down if possible. The face is covered with their own hands to protect the face from any flame (this can be remembered as an additional "Cover" step).
3. Roll – The fire-affected person rolls on a side or on both sides along the ground, according to the available space, in an effort to extinguish the fire by depriving it of oxygen. If the victim is on a rug or one is nearby, they can roll the rug around themselves to further extinguish the flame.

The effectiveness of stop, drop and roll may be further enhanced by combining it with other firefighting techniques, including the use of a fire extinguisher, dousing with water, or beating the flames on oneself (blankets are commonly used for that).

Those teaching the technique are advised to teach children the proper circumstances for its use. As such, some advice pamphlets regarding the technique suggest reminding children that this technique is only to be used in the event of catching on fire and not when a smoke alarm is sounding in a situation that requires immediate evacuation.
