= New Zealand Professional Firefighters Union =

NZPFU
- New Zealand Professional Firefighters Union
- Headquarters: Petone, New Zealand
- Location: New Zealand
- Key people: Wattie Watson, national secretary, Ian Wright, national president
- Affiliations: NZCTU
- Website: www.nzpfu.org.nz

The New Zealand Professional Firefighters Union (NZPFU) is a trade union providing professional advocacy and support for career firefighters, trainers, volunteer support officers, fire risk management officers, and fire and emergency dispatchers employed by Fire and Emergency New Zealand.

The NZPFU is affiliated with the New Zealand Council of Trade Unions as well as the International Association of Fire Fighters.

In addition to the key role the NZPFU played organizing a 1995 referendum on firefighter numbers in response to an industrial dispute, the NZPFU continues to work towards the betterment of working conditions for all of its members.
