= London Fire Brigade Museum =

Firefighting museum in London, England

Coordinates: 51°30′7″N 0°5′53″W

Winchester House – former London Fire Brigade Museum
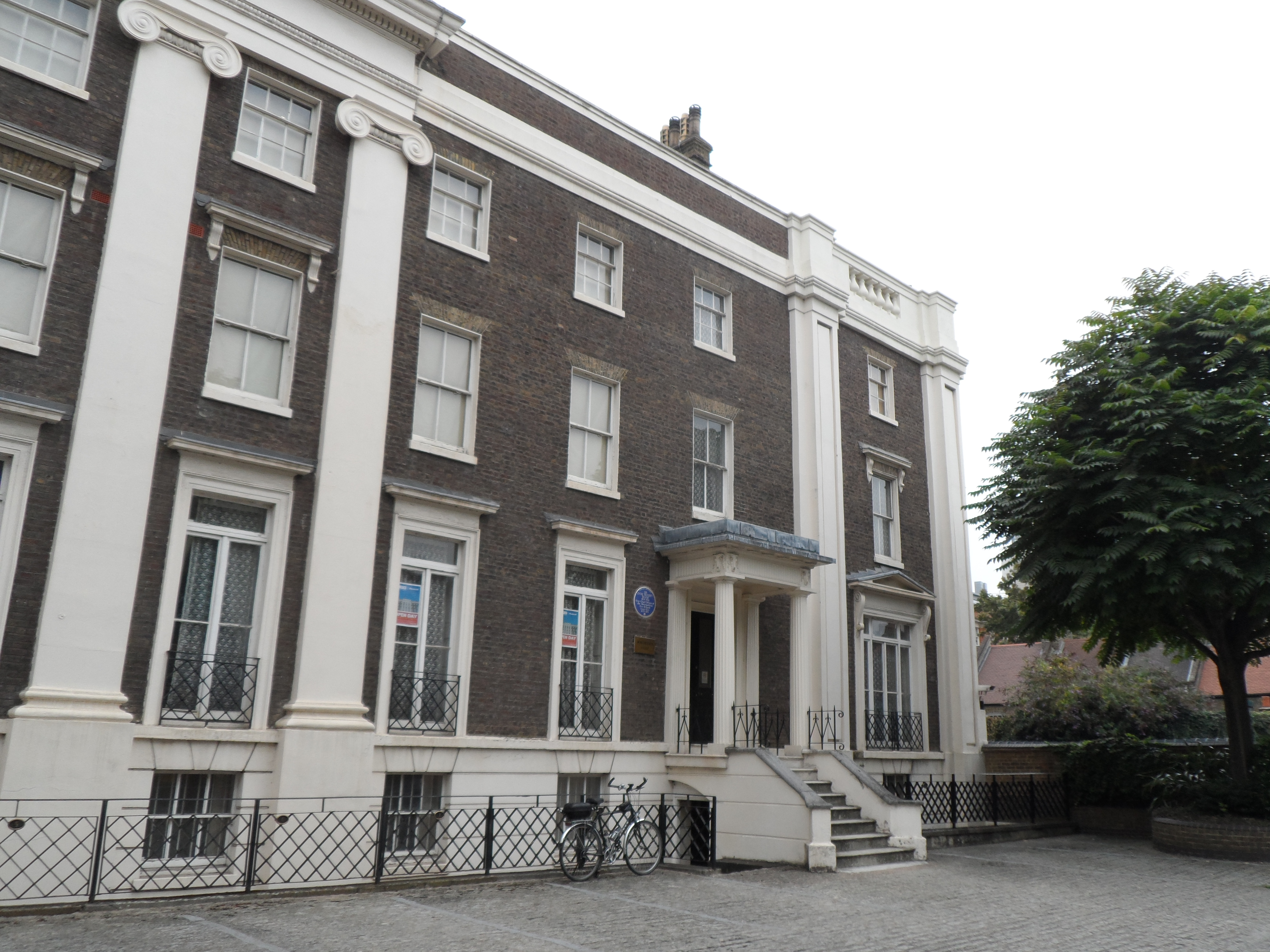
- Established: 1966; 59 years ago
- Website: www.london-fire.gov.uk

The London Fire Brigade Museum (temporarily closed to visitors) covers the history of firefighting since 1666 (the date of the Great Fire of London). The Museum holds over 20,000 items—from leather hoses to fine art paintings, charting the people, innovations, and milestones that have shaped firefighting in London and beyond.

== Overview ==
The museum was located in Winchester House, the former home of Captain Sir Eyre Massey Shaw, who was Superintendent of the Metropolitan Fire Brigade. It was the London Fire Brigade headquarters until 1937 when King George VI opened a new building on the Albert Embankment on the south bank of the River Thames.

The building at Winchester House closed its doors to the public in September 2015 and the collection was audited and put into storage pending the opening of a dedicated new museum.

In July 2015, members of London Fire and Emergency Planning Authority agreed to make the provision of a new museum, as well as a fire station, a condition of the sale and redevelopment of the Brigade's old headquarters on Albert Embankment in Lambeth.

== Current status ==
It was originally estimated that it would be 2023 before the new museum opens but in the meantime there would still be opportunities for the public to view the historic collection. These included temporary exhibitions across London, outreach visits and educational talks and lectures and events to commemorate the 150th anniversary celebrations. However, as of 2025, the museum remains closed and the collection is currently entirely digital.

== Former address ==
The former address of the museum was:

London Fire Brigade Museum
Winchester House
94A Southwark Bridge Road
London SE1 0UG
