= Firefighter's Combat Challenge =

American-based International competition

Scott Firefighter Combat Challenge
- Founded: 1991, by Dr. Paul Davis
- Country: Worldwide
- Official website: www.FirefighterChallenge.com

The Firefighter Combat Challenge is the only federally funded, university-based occupational health physiological research study that has become an internationally touring and televised sports event. It's a demanding 5-event physical challenge that firefighters throughout the world participate in and try to complete with the fastest time. Competition events include a stair climb with a high-rise pack, hose hoist, forcible entry, hose advance, and a victim rescue. The primary purpose for the Firefighter Combat Challenge is to promote physical fitness, an essential part of structural firefighting.

== History ==
In 1975, The Sports Medicine Center of the University of Maryland received a federal grant in the amount of $87K from the precursor to the US Fire Administration (The National Fire Prevention and Control Administration-then a part of the Department of Commerce). Instrumental in facilitating the grant was Chief Dave Gratz the Director of Fire-Rescue Services of Montgomery County (MD) and Dr. Leonard Marks (a candidate for the director of what would ultimately become the USFA). The research scientists who were the principal investigators of a study to measure and characterize the physical demands of structural fire fighting were Dr. Charles O. Dotson, Dr. D. Laine Santa Maria, Dr. Paul O. Davis and Dr. Richard A. Schwartz. Their research was published in a GPO Technical Report and later authored by Drs. Davis, Dotson and Santa Maria in the journal Medicine & Science in Sports & Exercise. While not intended as a sports competition, a large part of the research was based upon five sequentially performed fire ground evolutions garnered upon input from a Job Task Analysis (JTA) conducted with the assistance of the Greater Washington Council of Governments Fire Training Officers sub-committee. One-hundred randomly selected firefighters from five political jurisdictions participated in both laboratory-based physical performance measures and the Criterion Task Test (CTT). The results of the study graphically, and not surprisingly demonstrated an ascending level of performance with higher levels of muscular strength, lean body mass and PWC (physical work capacity). Originally intended as an entry-level, or personnel selection instrument, not until 1991 would the Firefighter Combat Challenge appear as a major industry sports event, when again, at the University of Maryland's MFRI (Maryland Fire Rescue Institute) would the first competition be held, organized by Dr. Paul Davis and the staff of On Target Productions.

The first challenge was won by Prince William County, VA in 1991, the only challenge held that year. In 1992, seven regional challenges were held, with the first World Challenge held coincidental with the IAFC convention in Anaheim, CA. DuPont was the Title Sponsor for the first two years. In 1994, Scott Health and Safety came on board and assumed Title Sponsor in 1999.

Television has been an important part of the Challenge. FETN covered the 1992 Championship followed by ESPN for 10 years. Recently, the Versus (VS) network, owned by Comcast has carried the World Challenge Championships. Through an assortment of media outlets, upwards of 40 million people per year can be identified as gross market impressions.

The rules, procedures and trademarks of this competition (Intellectual Property, i.e., IP) are protected through a copyright issued by the US Patent Office in 1993. Licenses for running sanctioned events are currently in force and being expanded to such countries as New Zealand, Germany, Slovenia and Hungary.

At the conclusion of the 2009 Season, 308 Firefighter Combat Challenge events have been held in 44 states and the District of Columbia- as well as Toronto and Ottawa. The last remaining states yet to host an FCC event are: Connecticut, Hawaii, New Hampshire, Rhode Island and Vermont.

World record for open male is 1:14.76 set by Ian Van Reenen in 2017.

=== 2022: Series Renamed the "Firefighter Challenge Competition" ===
After Dr. Paul O. Davis retired, the program became a U.S. based 501(c)(3) charitable organization. An 18-month re-assessment was conducted by more than 1,500 stakeholders and the a new model was born. This new sport was renamed the "Firefighter Challenge Championship Series. (FCL)"

In 2024 all copyright, trademark, and intellectual property were transferred to the First Responder Institute and the FCL and renamed, once again, to "Firefighter Challenge and Firefighter Combat Challenge."

=== 2025: Title Sponsor and Regions ===
In 2025, Servpro became the title sponsor for the SERVPRO® FCL. The league is divided into five (5) regions in the U.S.

Region	Included States
West	Alaska, California, Colorado, Hawaii, Idaho, Montana, Nevada, Oregon, Utah, Washington, Wyoming
Southwest	Includes: Arizona, Arkansas, Louisiana, New Mexico, Oklahoma, Texas
Midwest	Illinois, Indiana, Iowa, Kansas, Michigan, Minnesota, Missouri, Nebraska, North Dakota, South Dakota, Wisconsin
Northeast	Connecticut, Delaware, District of Columbia, Maine, Maryland, Massachusetts, New Hampshire, New Jersey, New York, Ohio, Pennsylvania, Rhode Island, Vermont
Southeast	Alabama, Florida, Georgia, Kentucky, Mississippi, North Carolina, South Carolina, Tennessee, Virginia, West Virginia

=== 2025 Event Schedule ===
Dates	Event	Location
April 8–11, 2025	FDIC Season Opener Firefighter Challenge Event	Indianapolis, IN
April 24–26, 2025	Servpro West Regional Firefighter Challenge Classic	Salt Lake City, UT
May 15–17, 2025	Southwest Regional Firefighter Challenge Classic	Baton Rouge, LA
June 19–21, 2025	Servpro Midwest Regional Firefighter Challenge Classic	St. Paul, MN
July 1–3, 2025	Southeast Regional Firefighter Challenge Classic	Hoover, AL
August 21–23, 2025	Northeast Regional Firefighter Challenge Classic	Erie, PA
September 24–27, 2025	Firefighter Challenge United States National Championship	Oklahoma City, OK
October 20–25, 2025	Firefighter Challenge World Championship	Farmers Branch, TX

== World Records ==
- Open Male Relay. Carlsbad Fire Dept Geronimo Ontiveros, Todd Vannatter, Mark Johnson, Richard Ramirez, Casey Collins, 1:02.79 (Carlsbad, NM)
- Open Male: Ian Van Reenen, 1:14.76 (Sarnia, ON)
- Open Female: Juliet Draper, 1:48.41 Colorado Springs, CO)
- Over 40: Mike Gilbert, 1:26.65 (St. Catherines, ON)
- Over 45: Lonnie Lewis, 1:33.82 (Chesterfield, VA)
- Over 50: Alan Ertzner, 1:31.87, (Fort Calhoun, NE)
- Over 55: Alan Ertzner, 1:31.87 (Fort Calhooun, NE)
- Over 60: Roy Davis, 1:52.74 (Tacoma, WA)

== Participants ==
All firefighters, both currently employed or retired, who are members of any first responder organizations (EMS or Fire-Rescue) are eligible to compete in the challenge.

Competition categories include Individual (running the entire course by one's self); Tandem: dividing the course between two people, Team (adding the fastest three of five people's times) and the Relay (three-to-five people negotiating the course, with each performing one of the specific tasks), passing a baton to the next person after the completion of a task.

All competitors must participate with NFPA (National Fire Protection Association) compliant turn-out gear and wearing a Scott SCBA.

== Events ==
Individual competitors or Teams must complete a total of five events consecutively, in the order below. Competitors must wear a helmet, coat, pants with liners, boots, gloves, and a breathing apparatus—an SCBA—during the entire duration of competition. The Challenge is timed from the start of the first event to the end of the fifth event. Competitors must complete the five events within six minutes. Completion times below three minutes are considered excellent. Times below five minutes are acceptable. Since this Challenge is extremely physical, the course director may end a competitor's run if they see the competitor is risking their own health.

=== Stair Climb with High Rise Pack ===
The first event is the stair climb. This Challenge consists of a 42 lb. hose which must be carried up six flights of stairs. This activity replicates a five-story building where water is needed at the top. The 42 lb. hose is a standard 100 ft., 1.75 in. thick. hose. The stairwell consists of six sets of stairs, each with ten steps. The firefighter must carry the hose up the stairs and place it in a container box on the top story of the stairwell. The hose may not touch the ground at any point before the firefighter places it in the container box. Once the 42 lb. hose is in the box, the firefighter may proceed with the second event, then descend the stairs, touching each tread and holding on to both handrails on each side of the stairway. On reaching the floor, the firefighter goes onto the next event. Their time is continued and any penalties are added to the final time. Penalties include not touching every step or holding onto the hand rails, which results in a 2-second time addition to their final time per occurrence. The firefighter may also be disqualified if at any time the hose comes off or slides out of the container at the top of the stairway.

=== Hose Hoist ===
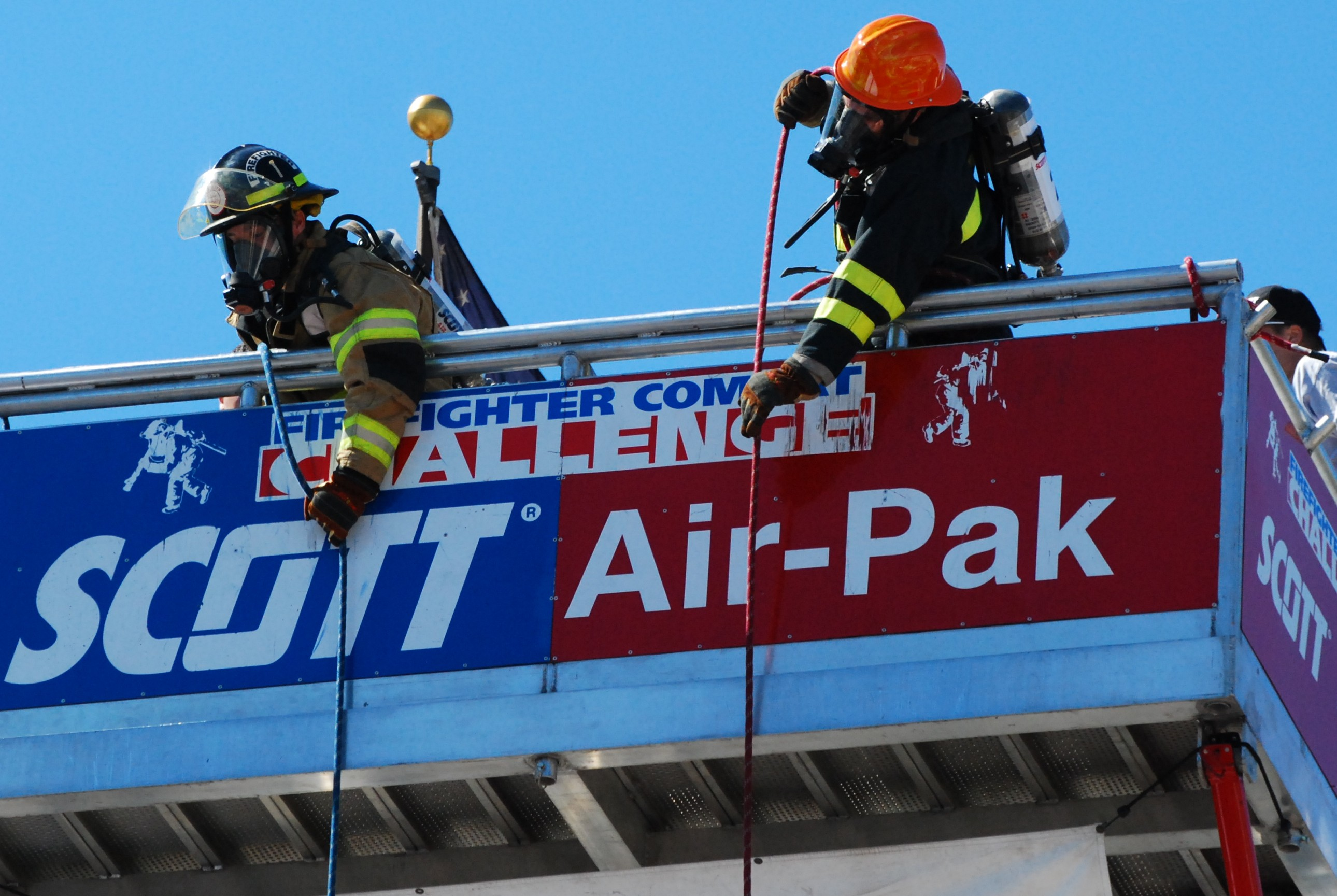
Hose Hoist-Competitor raising a 42 lb. donut roll up the 5 story FCC Tower

The second event is the Hose Hoist. Using a hand-over-hand motion, the competitor must pull up a 42-pound (19 kg) hose roll and place it into the box on the top of the 5-story Tower. The 42 lb. prop is a donut roll of large diameter hose (LDH [plus 7 pounds [7.2 kg] of rope). Time continues from the previous event. Loss of control (i.e., allowing the donut to fall more than one story), will result in disqualification.

=== Forcible Entry ===
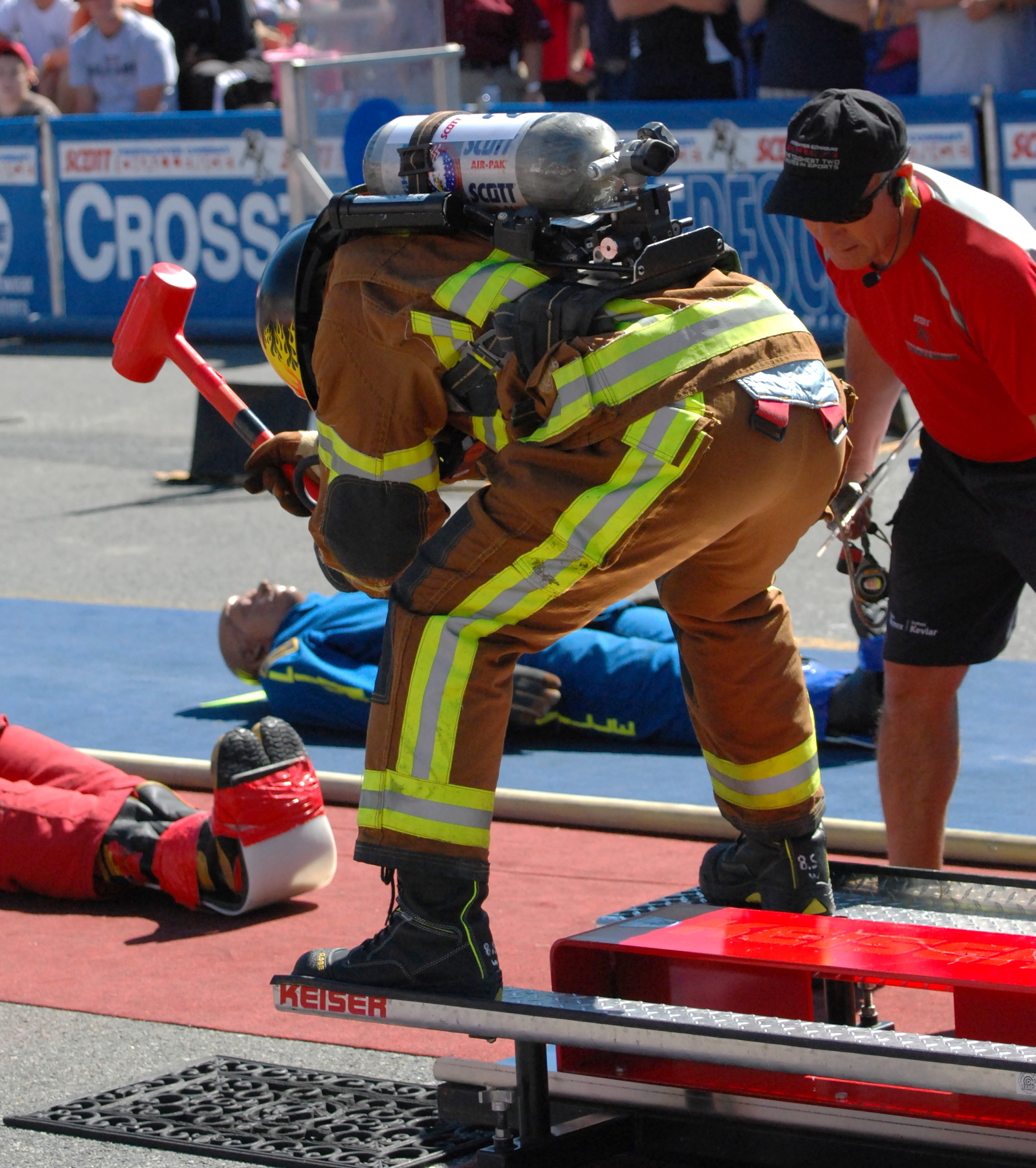
Forcible Entry-Competitor hitting 160 lb. beam with 9 lb. sledgehammer

The third event is the forcible entry challenge. This event simulates a firefighter breaking down a door or wall to enter a burning building. The forcible entry simulator used during the Firefighter Combat Challenge is called the KEISER FORCE Machine. In this evolution, the firefighter stands over a 160 lb. beam. They must slam a nine and a half-pound shot mallet into the beam until the beam moves five feet. The firefighter must keep both hands below a tape-marked line on the mallet, and only contact the beam with the head of the mallet. This tape marked line is 1 ft. down from the head of the mallet. The upper edge of the beam is covered with a pressure-sensitive tape that makes contacts other than by the head of the mallet visible. The firefighter receives a warning for the first handle strike. Any hit by the handle afterwards adds five seconds to the final time. Pushing, and raking of the beam is not allowed and is grounds for disqualification. At the first hit, time continues from the previous event. The event is complete once the competitor places the mallet on a 4’ x 3’ mat at the end of the 5 ft. distance. Any part of the mallet must be placed on the mat before the firefighter goes to the next event.

=== Hose Advance ===
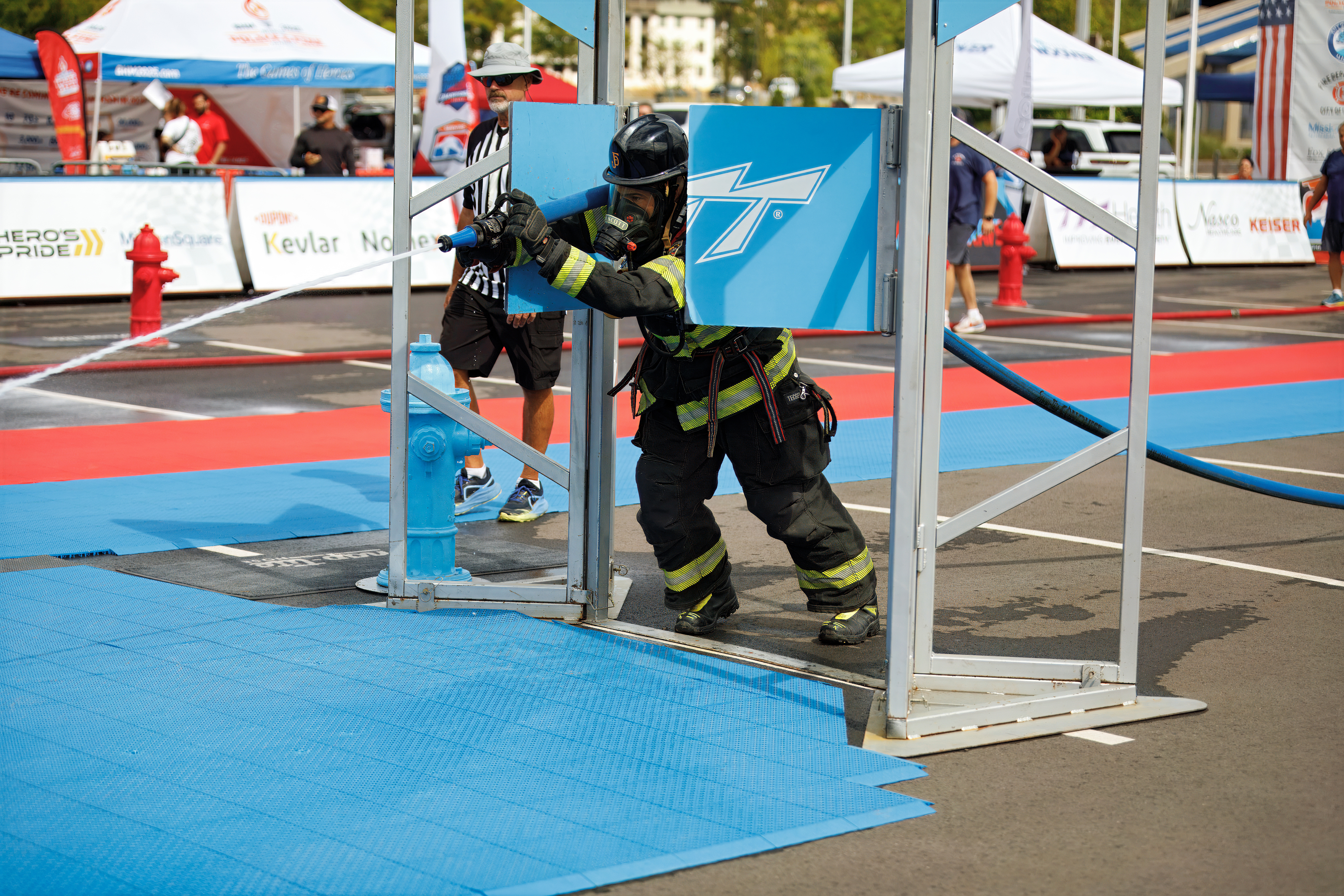
Firefighter competing in the 2024 Southeast Regional Firefighter Challenge Classic in Hoover, Alabama.

The fourth event is the hose advance. This simulates a firefighter running from a fire engine towards a close fire. The competitor sprints 140 feet and picks up a 1.75 in. diameter charged (pressurized with water) hose, sprints five more feet with the hose, then drags it an additional 75 feet. Once at the 75 ft line and through the swinging doors, the competitor must then open the hose nozzle, releasing water onto a small target. After hitting the target, they must close the nozzle and drop the hose, which completes the event. The hose nozzle may only be opened once the nozzle opens the swinging doors, if the nozzle is opened earlier a 2-second penalty is added to the final time. If the competitor does not close the nozzle, they must come back close the nozzle and then resume the final event.

=== Victim Rescue ===
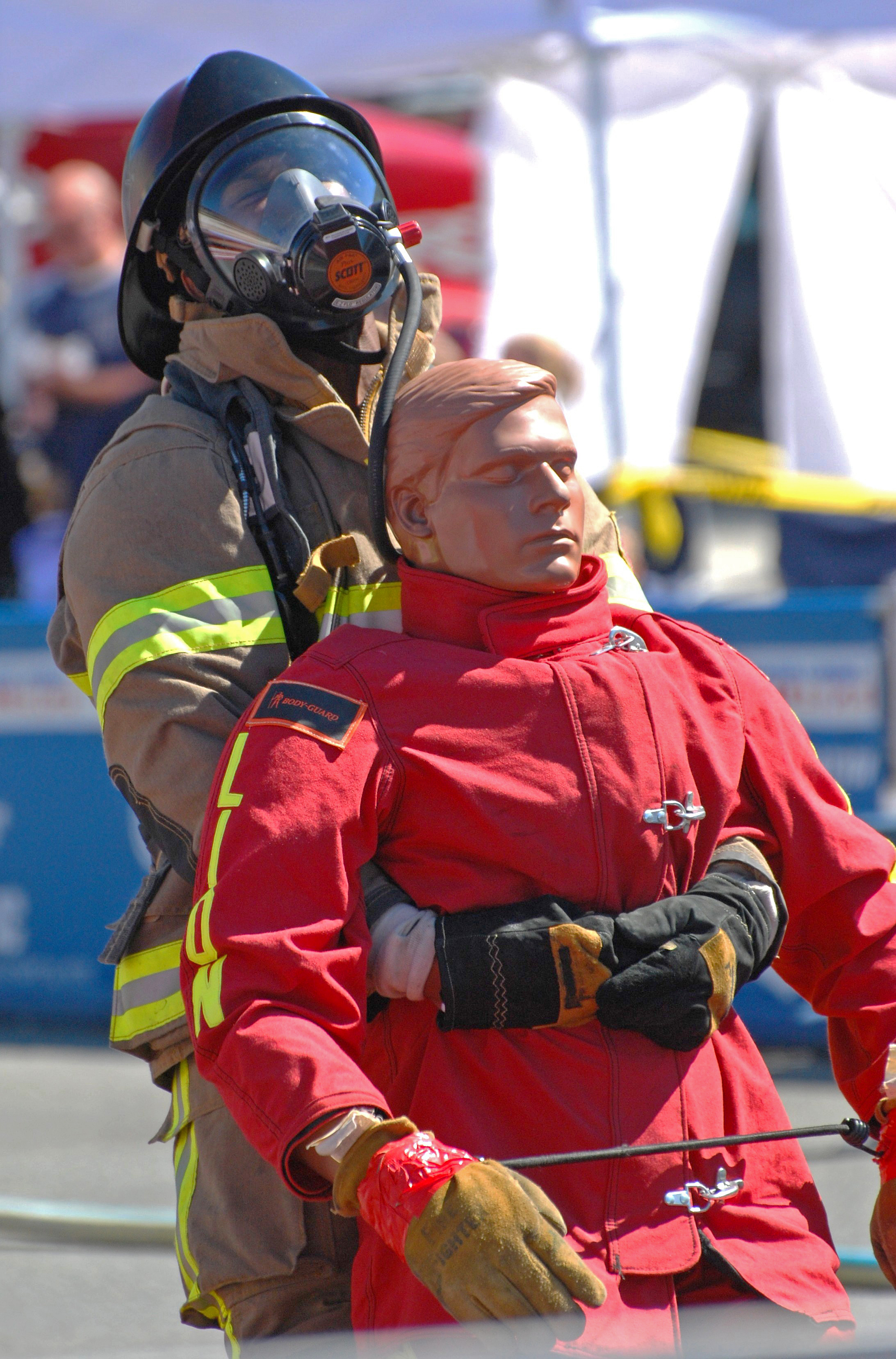
Victim Rescue- Competitor dragging mannequin from behind down the 100ft runway

The fifth and final event is the victim rescue. This event simulates a firefighter removing a victim from a fire as quickly as possible to save the victim from injury. A 175 lb. mannequin must be picked up from the ground, grabbed from behind, and dragged backwards 100 ft. The competitor must drag it backwards at all points of time. The competitor must grab the mannequin from behind with their arms beneath the mannequins arms and around the mannequin's chest. Time ends once the 175 pound mannequin and the competitor passes the 100 ft line. Then competition has ended the Challenge course, and time is stopped.
