= Fireman's carry =

Technique for carrying another person

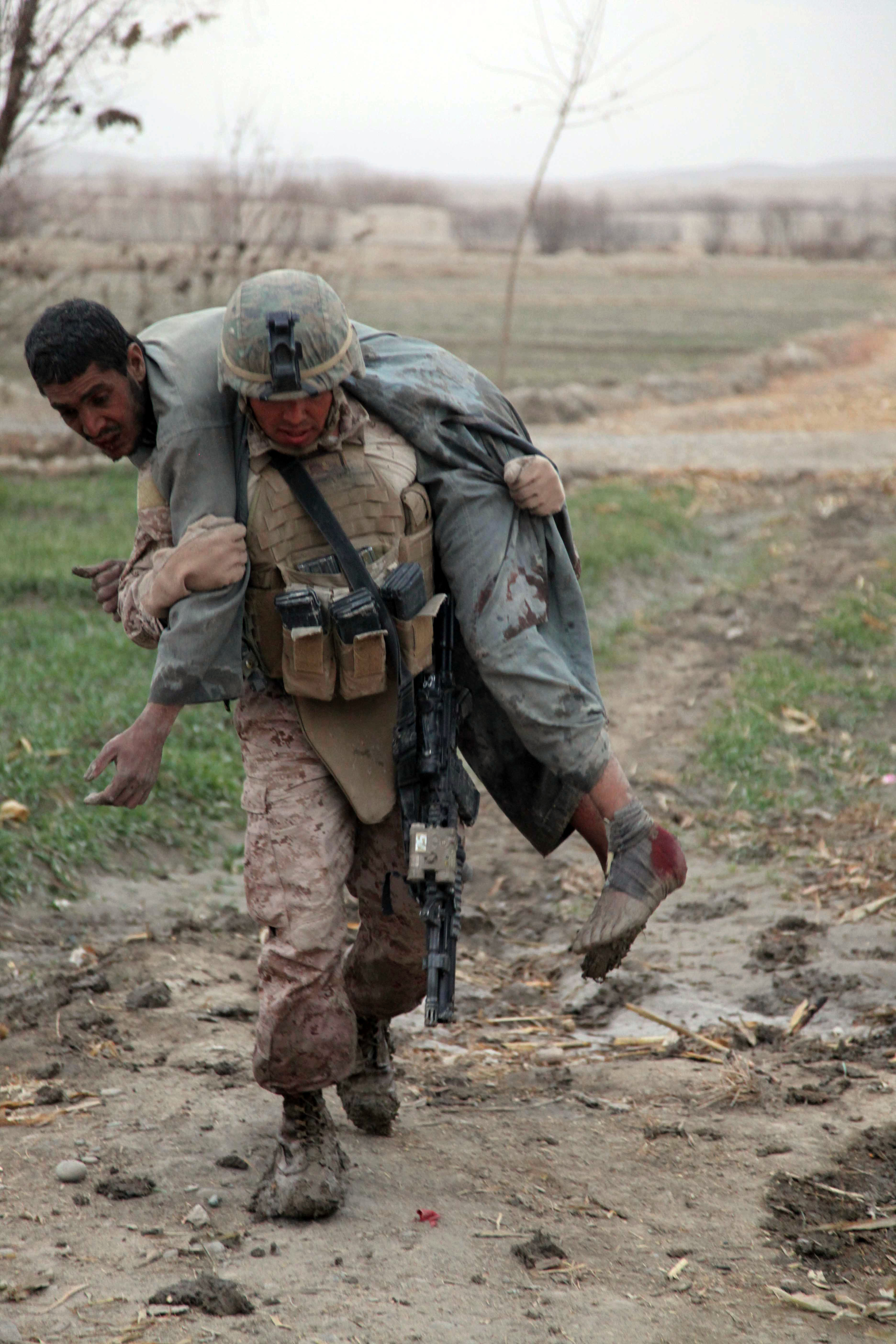
A US Marine carrying an injured Afghan after an IED blast, 2011.

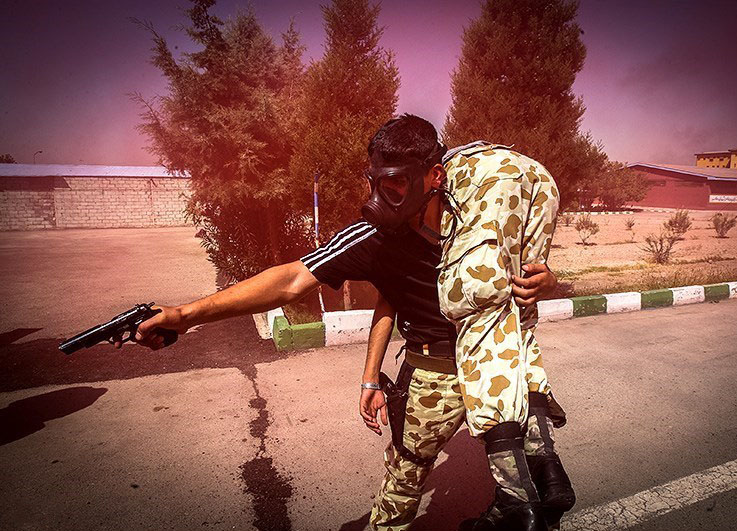
An Iranian soldier performing a fireman's carry to rescue a wounded comrade while using his pistol in a military exercise.

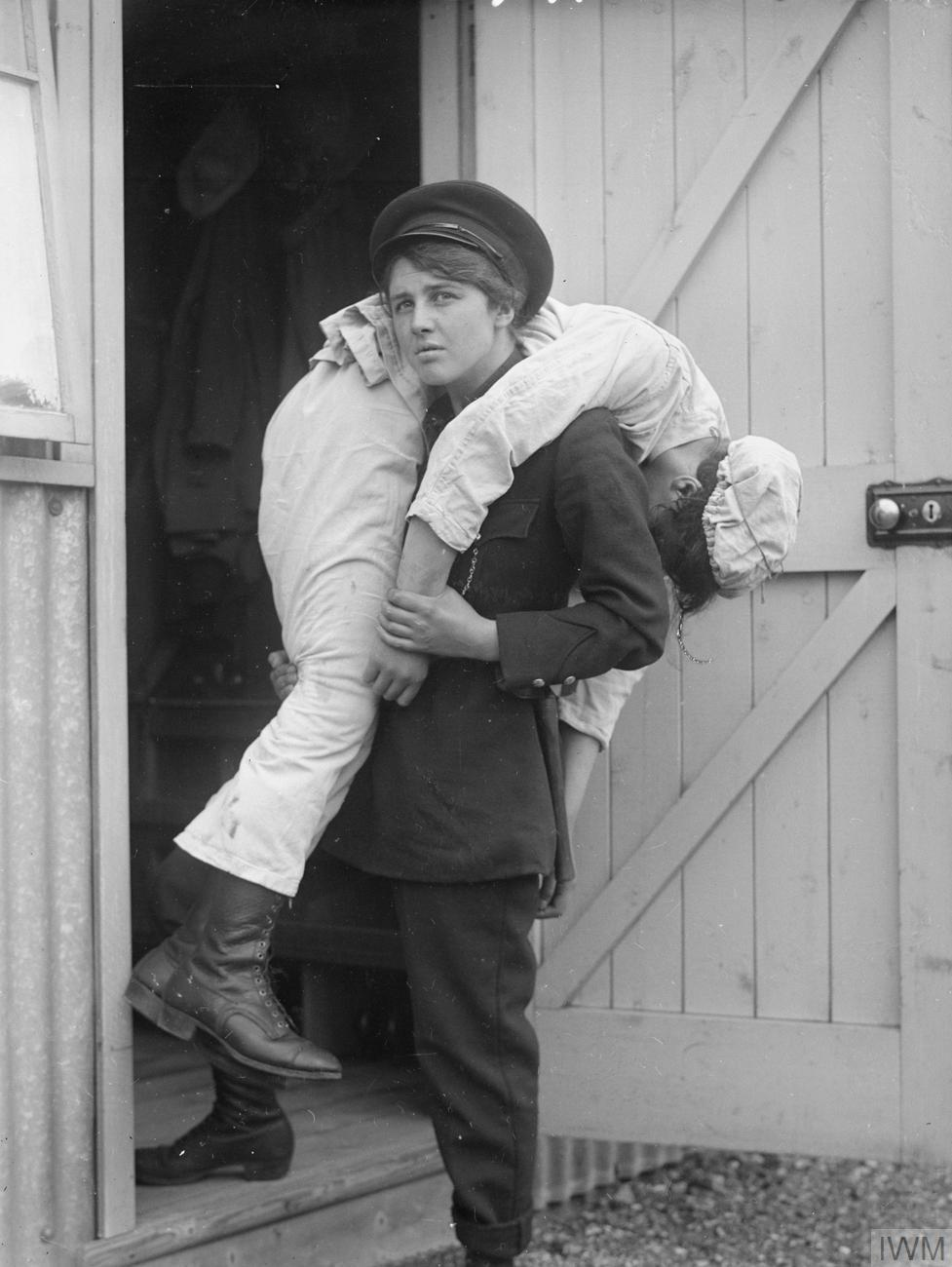
A firefighter carrying a worker out of a munitions factory following a fire during World War I

A fireman's carry or fireman's lift (also firefighter's-) is a technique allowing one person to carry another person without assistance, by placing the carried person across the shoulders of the carrier.

The technique was commonly used by firefighters to carry injured or unconscious people away from danger, but has been replaced in firefighting due to the drawback that smoke and heat are greater higher up, and may be fatal to the person being carried.

The "fireman's carry" technique is still taught for use outside firefighting. Soldiers use this technique to carry the wounded. Lifeguards are sometimes trained to use the fireman's carry.

== Advantages ==
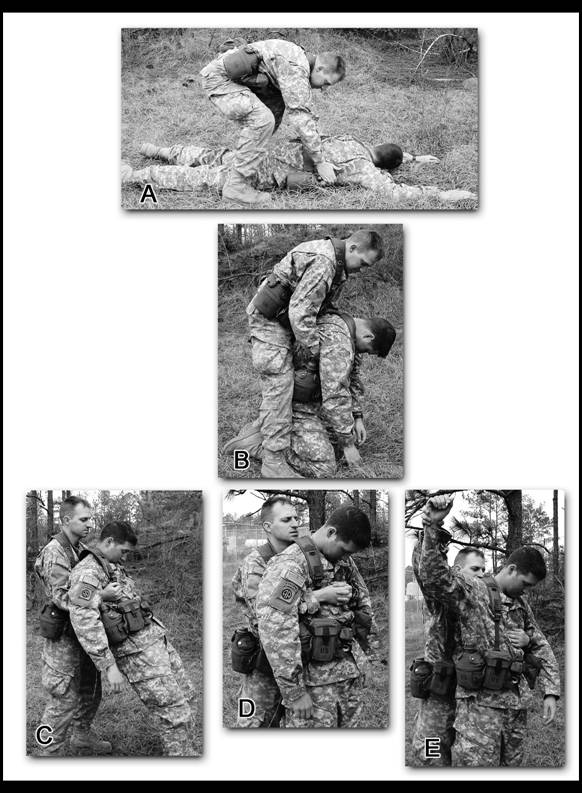
Steps A to E

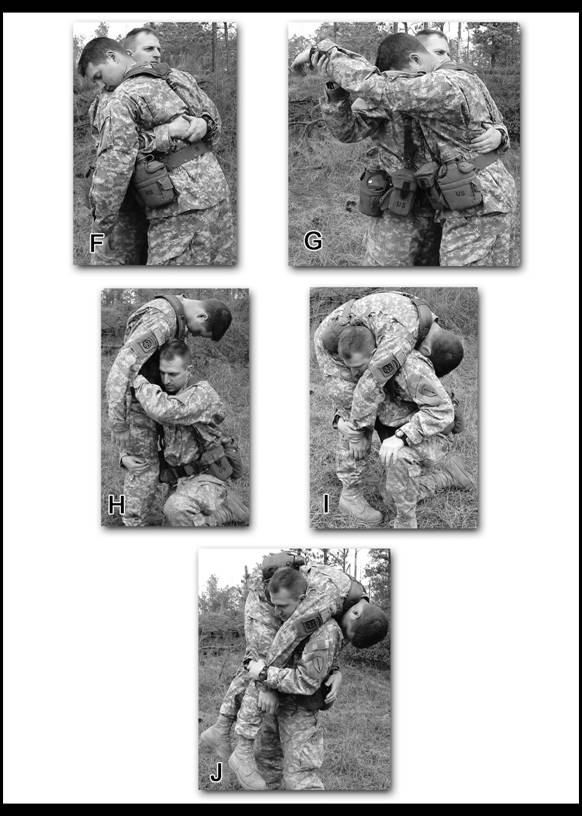
Steps F to J

The "Fireman's Carry" technique illustrated in a US Army training manual

Carrying someone in this manner has several advantages over other methods of moving another person. The subject's torso is fairly level, which helps prevent further injuries. When the subject's weight is evenly distributed over both shoulders, it is easier to carry them for a longer distance – 50 feet (15 metres) or more.

The fireman's carry is preferred over a single-shoulder carry if someone is seriously hurt or if the person must be carried for a considerable amount of time. A person being carried over one shoulder would experience more jarring as their body is dangling more freely over the carrier's shoulder. Also, blood would be unevenly distributed if someone was dangling upside-down over the carrier's shoulder for an extended period of time. This could also be a very uncomfortable position for the carried person if they are still conscious.

The fireman's carry allows a soldier to carry an injured comrade securely using only one hand, leaving their other hand free to carry and fire their weapon if required.

== Disadvantages ==
In firefighting, smoke and heat are greater higher up, and may be fatal to the person being carried. The person carried is largely outside the rescuer's field of vision, and almost all vital areas are out of the rescuer's view. Thus, dangerous changes in their condition can be missed, and an inexperienced rescuer can inadvertently create or further compound injuries via collision with obstacles. Furthermore, the rescuer's obstructed peripheral vision puts both persons at risk if the incident that caused the injury is still ongoing (fire, combat, public disturbances, etc.). It is also harder to get a patient onto a rescuer's shoulders than it is to drag a patient by their shoulders.

The fireman's carry presents severe hazards if the person being carried has or may have a spinal injury, and should be avoided.

== Current practice in firefighting ==
The fireman's carry, utilizing back and shoulder strength, is engineered as an emergency measure to optimize power, endurance, and mobility. As such, it may not be applicable where there is ongoing hazard, the carried person is larger than the rescuer, the rescuer is otherwise unable to move the victim at all, or it is imperative to cross significant distances, quickly. It is by no means appropriate when a stretcher or a viable alternative is available, or when the rescuer has the size and strength to easily carry the subject in a gentler, more compassionate and considerate hold.

Currently, the technique preferred in firefighting involves dragging a person by the shoulders or upper clothing in a supine position across the floor or ground. This uses the rescuer's upper legs (the strongest muscles in the body) to push against the floor for leverage in order to pull the person towards an exit. This technique is also easier for rescuers who may be younger or of smaller size or stature. In addition, dragging by the shoulders helps avoid stressing a potentially injured spine. Dragging by the feet can cause head injuries due to the victim's head bouncing on the floor.
