= Dead man zone =

Area directly around a bushfire

The dead man zone is the area directly around a bushfire that is likely to burn within five minutes given the current wind conditions or an anticipated change in wind direction. The distance this zone extends from the firefront is highly dependent on terrain, windspeed, fuel type and composition, relative humidity and ambient temperature, and can range from under 100 metres (330 ft) to well over 1 kilometre (3,300 ft).

== Project Vesta ==
The term dead man zone was coined by members of the CSIRO research team in Australia who were investigating the spread of bushfires (Project Vesta). The dead man zone is approximately 8 kilometres (5.0 mi) around the fire that is likely to burn. This dead man zone can be a safety net for firefighters if the fire is moving at a high speed. The dead man zone can also be prepared in a way that slows down the fire. Firefighters can get outside the dead man zone safely without seeing what the fire is going to do and develop a plan of attack or defense upon the fire's next move. If the dead man zone is not used, wind change can sneak up on the firefighters and resulting in potentially unsafe distances where they are not able to defend themselves. This can be a life or death situation if not approached properly, and there have been examples of firefighters that became trapped and ultimately killed in Australia. Project Vesta, headed by scientist Phil Cheney, found that when the wind changes direction, the line of fire will move out at its maximum rate of spread almost immediately, and that the spread speed was nearly three times what was previously thought. Project Vesta's research into bushfire behavior makes up the majority of what is known about bushfires today.

== Outcomes ==
Outcomes from Project Vesta have been integrated into firefighter training in Australia and are beginning to appear in the United States.

Firefighters try to stay out of the dead man zone at all times, working from safe points such as burnt ground or a large area of non-burnable ground, such as a cricket or Australian rules football oval, or a large car park. This is achieved by attacking the fire from the flanks, or the rear, so that burnt ground is always nearby, and the fire is always in front of the firefighters. This avoids two disadvantages of attacking fires at the head of the fire where spot fires may start behind them or changes in wind behavior might accelerate the spread of the fire.

The result of several inquiries into firefighter death in Australian bushfires found that firefighters should stay out of the dead man zone and that they should always keep 250 liters of water in their truck for personal safety. This is now a standard operating procedure in the NSW Rural Fire Service, Country Fire Service and Country Fire Authority in Australia.

== See also ==
- Ash Wednesday bushfires
- Bushfires in Australia
- Country Fire Authority (Victoria, Australia)
- List of disasters in Australia by death toll
- New South Wales Rural Fire Service (Australia)
- South Australian Country Fire Service
