= International Firefighters' Day =

Observance (May 4)

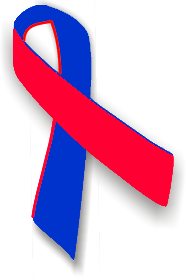
Red and blue ribbon, a symbol of International Firefighters Day

International Firefighters' Day (IFFD) is observed on May 4, to honour firefighters for their service internationally, remember firefighters who lost their lives during service and to commemorate firefighters killed in the September 11 attacks. It was established after a proposal by Australian firefighter, JJ Edmondson, was made on January 4, 1999, following the deaths of five firefighters fighting a bushfire in Australia on 2 December, 1998.

== Proposal and establishment ==
On December 2 1998, firefighters of the Geelong West Fire Brigade responded to a call for assistance by other firefighters fighting a wildfire from Linton, Victoria, Australia. A sudden change of wind direction caused due to a cold front led to the fire truck being engulfed by the fire on the way to refilling the water tank. As a result, five Geelong West firefighters were killed: Garry Vredeveldt, Christopher Evans, Stuart Davidson, Jason Thomas, and Matthew Armstrong. This incident eventually led to the proposal for an International Firefighters' Day.

== Activities ==
=== Sound off ritual ===
A "sound off" occurs at noon local time on the first Sunday of May, as part of International Firefighters' Day. It involves turning on fire sirens for 30 seconds, and a subsequent moment of silence for one minute to commemorate all firefighters who were killed in line of duty. The sound off began in 2002, and has been continued annually.

=== Fire prevention ===
Fire prevention and the need for more intensive and thorough training is promoted through International Firefighters' Day, and the day is seen as an important opportunity to raise both skills and awareness.

== Symbols ==
=== Red and blue ribbon ===
The red and blue ribbon is a symbol used for International Firefighters Day, the ribbon is 5 cm (2 inches) long and 1 cm (0.39 inches) wide, with the two separate colors, representing the elements firefighters work with, conjoined at the top. The red of the ribbon represents fire while the blue represents water. The ribbon is traditionally worn on the lapel but is not limited to the lapel.

=== Saint Florian ===
Saint Florian, regarded in the Catholic Church as the patron saint of firefighters, is another symbol of International Firefighters' Day. The saint's day (as observed in the Catholic Church) of St. Florian is May 4, hence International Firefighters' Day is also observed on May 4. This day is seen as a day to hold events such as memorials or fundraisers.
