= Fireman's switch =

Type of switch

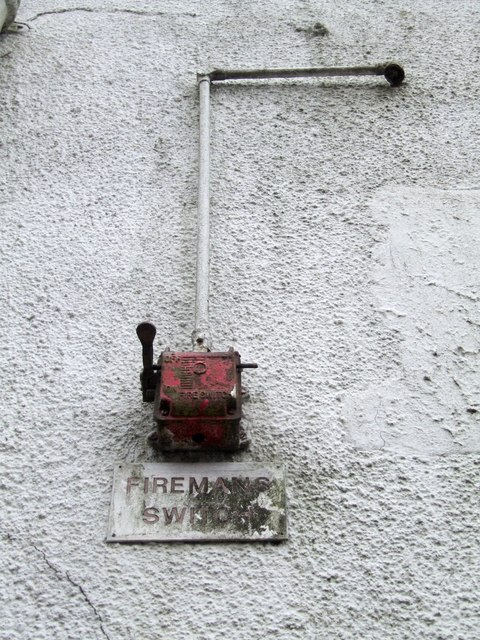
The Phoenix, Spilsby On the cinema façade is the Fireman's Switch, presumably to turn all the electrics off.

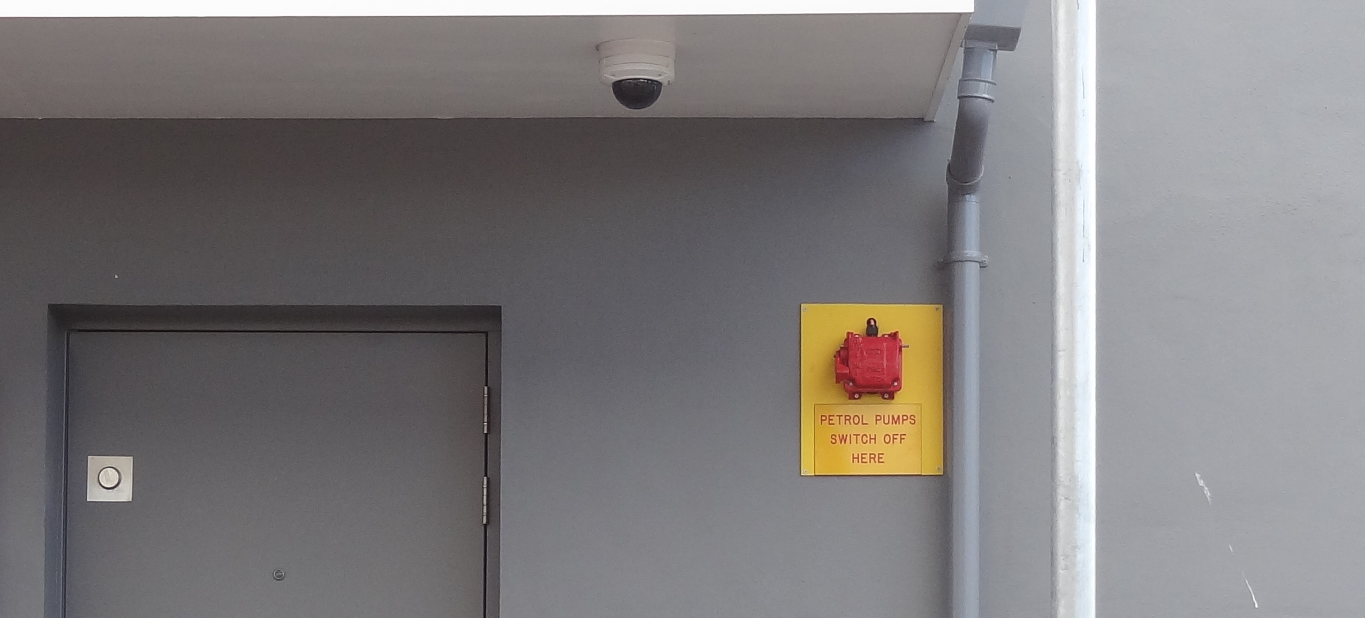
Switch used to shut off petrol pumps at a petrol station in the event of a fire

A fireman's switch is a specialized switch that allows firefighters to quickly disconnect power from high voltage devices that may pose a danger in the event of an emergency. According to the Institution of Electrical Engineers, any electrical device operating at over 1,000 Volts AC or 1,500 volts DC, must be equipped with the switch.

In order to be a valid device, the switch must meet the following standards:

- It must isolate all live conductors. Only one switch should control the entire exterior and a second switch control the interior.
- The switch should be red and be fitted with a nameplate saying "FIREMAN'S SWITCH".
- The ON and OFF positions for the switch must be clearly indicated and visible to someone standing on the ground. Additionally the OFF position must be on the top, this is to help prevent accidental movement to the ON position.
- The switch must be in a clearly visible location, not more than 2.75 metres (9 ft 0 in) from the ground. For exterior devices, the switch should be adjacent to the controls for the devices. Interior switches should be adjacent to the main entrance to the building.

== See also ==
- Fire service mode
