= Wetdown =

US fire department ritual

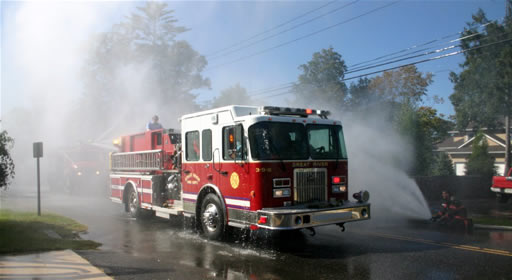
Great River Fire Department's first due engine being wetdown

A wet down is a ritual celebrated by many volunteer fire departments in the United States in which squads of firefighters from neighboring towns ritualistically commission a new fire apparatus by anointing it with water sprayed from the visitors' firefighting equipment.

If two new apparatus' are commissioned, then it is considered to be a "double wet down". If three new apparatus' are commissioned, then it is called a "triple wet down". Or if four new apparatus' are commissioned, then it is considered as a "quadruple wet down".

== History ==
The tradition dates back to the late 1800s, when fire departments used horses to pull a fire apparatus to fires. After fighting the fire, the crews would wash and ready the horses and the apparatus in preparation for the next call, then they would push the apparatus into the station's bay.

== Examples ==
- Princeton Fire-Rescue — July 9, 2021
- Paducah Fire Department — August 31, 2020
- Lynchburg Fire Department — March 11, 2020
- Amarillo Fire Department — October 08, 2018
- Plano's Fire Station 2 — April 26, 2018
