= International Association of Wildland Fire =

Non-profit organization in Montana, US

- Type: 501(c)(3) organization
- Founded: 1990
- Headquarters: Missoula, Montana, United States of America
- Key people: Jason Greenlee, Founder; Dr. Thomas Zimmerman, President of Board of Directors, Mikel Robinson, Executive Director
- Website: iawfonline.org

The International Association of Wildland Fire (IAWF), a non-profit organization, is professional association of the wildland fire community. IAWF is an independent organization, not affiliated with any private or public agencies. It purpose is to offer a common and neutral ground for the discussion of important and often controversial wildland fire issues. The organization has a 15-member board of directors. It aims to include members in the areas of wildland fire management, research, suppression, and policy.

== Publications ==
Two periodicals are official publications of the IAWF:

- Wildfire Magazine is the membership periodical publication of IAWF, aimed at the international fire suppression community.
- The International Journal of Wildland Fire is an international scientific journal, published through CSIRO Publishing. As of 2021, Susan G. Conard and Stefan Doerr serve as joint Editors-in-Chief. It is indexed by standard scientific databases, including the Web of Science. It publishes peer-reviewed articles on all aspects of wildfire research, including ecology aspects, wildfire behavior, and wildfire modeling. IAWF members have free online access to the journal.

== Conferences ==
Wildland Fire Safety Summits
Since 1997, the International Association of Wildland Fire has been putting on its International Wildland Fire Safety Summits. This conference, which has been held in Canada, Australia, Europe and the United States, brings together members of the wildland fire community. Through seminars, presentations and breakout sessions, the conference allows participants to exchange information about fireline safety, risk management, cultural changes, and wildland fire research.
Wildland Fire Policy Summits
In 2002 and 2006, the IAWF convened meetings of major U.S. wildland fire organizations in Washington, D.C. to discuss ways the organizations can work together more effectively to address the wildland fire problem. The meetings, entitled Wildland Fire Policy Summits, were attended by representatives from a wide variety of organizations, both governmental and non-governmental.
Fire Behavior and Fuels Conferences
In 2006, 2007 and 2010 the IAWF, with the National Wildfire Coordinating Group and other organizations, put on conferences covering the latest innovations in wildland fire management practices—success stories as well as lessons learned, collaboration opportunities, cutting edge advances in wildland fire sciences, current and potential future wildland fire policy. In February 2013 the 4th Fire Behavior and Fuels Conference will be held in Raleigh, North Carolina.

Human Dimensions of Wildland Fire Conferences

In 2007 and 2010 the IAWF presented the Human Dimensions of Wildland Fire Conferences. This series has advanced the knowledge and practice related to the human side of managing fire prone landscapes. In 2012 the 3rd conference will be hosted in Seattle, Washington on April 17–19.

== Scholarships ==
Each year the IAWF awards two student scholarships; in 2011, scholarships were awarded to students from Mexico and the United States. These scholarships, each worth US$3,000, were designated for Master of Science or PhD. students studying wildland fire or wildland fire-related topics. The IAWF is exploring ways to expand the scholarship program to also include students enrolled in undergraduate wildland fire programs.

== FireNet ==
FireNet is a moderated email-based discussion and information distribution system, or listserv, specifically serving the wildland fire global community. This is a free service for subscribers.

Posted messages go out to the entire global network. Blatant advertisements for commercial products or messages with degrading language or images are not allowed. All posts are viewed and approved by a moderator before release to help eliminate unwanted intrusion to FireNet subscribers. All other reasonable messages relating to wildland fire, including requests for information, ideas, opinions and announcements are posted.

== Survey of Wildland Firefighters ==
On July 10, 2001, The Thirtymile fire, started by an escaped campfire near Winthrop, Washington, claimed the lives of four U.S. Forest Service firefighters. On January 30, 2007, the U.S. Attorney in Spokane, Washington, charged the Incident Commander of the fire, Ellreese Daniels, with four counts of involuntary manslaughter and seven counts of making false statements.

On February 20, 2007, the IAWF released a survey of 3,362 firefighters which showed that 36% of the full-time wildland firefighters surveyed will make themselves less available to be assigned to wildland fires as a direct result of manslaughter charges filed against a firefighter in Washington state.

== IAWF Awards ==
The IAWF WILDLAND FIRE SAFETY AWARD is given to someone in the wildland firefighting community who has made a significant contribution to wildland firefighter safety, either directly on the fireline, or indirectly through management or cultural changes. The purpose of the IAWF EMBER AWARD is to acknowledge sustained achievement in wildland fire science. The name 'Ember' was chosen to reflect the fact that research and science often move slowly, and their benefits or impacts may not be apparent for years or more.

== Infamous World Fires ==
The International Association of Wildland Fire created a partial list, by date of the year, of some of the more famous, or infamous, multiple fatality wildland fires around the world over the last 150 years. It is not intended to be a complete list of every fatality fire. By having these wildland fires on a calendar, the lessons learned from even a 130-year-old fire will be less likely to be forgotten. An unforgotten lesson learned may save the life of a current or future firefighter.
