= National Fire Information Council =

The National Fire Information Council (NFIC) is a United States agency that encourages and perpetuates the use of a standardized national incident reporting system (the National Fire Incident Reporting System (NFIRS) as a means of addressing the nation's fire problem and related emergency services issues. The NFIRS is operated by the United States Fire Administration under the Department of Homeland Security.

The NFIRS information modules describe the kind of incident responded to, where it occurred, the resources and methods used to mitigate it, losses, and other information designed specifically to understand the nature and causes of fire, hazardous material (HazMat), and emergency medical service (EMS) incidents. Information is also collected on the number of civilian or firefighter casualties and an estimate of property loss. The NFIRS is used to develop national public education campaigns, make recommendations for national codes and standards, guide the allocation of federal funds, determine consumer product failures, identify the focus for research efforts, and support federal legislation. The information collection format guides for the NFRIS are available on the site.

The use National Fire Incident Reporting System (NFIRS) is discontinued in February 2026 and there has been a transition to the National Emergency Response Information System (NERIS)
