= Firefighters Association of the State of New York =

Organization for volunteer firefighters

The Firefighters Association of the State of New York, more commonly known as FASNY, is an organization whose mission is to educate, serve and support volunteer firefighters in New York State. FASNY was founded in 1872 and its main headquarters are in Albany, New York. Originally known as the Firemen’s Association of the State of New York, it changed its name in 2022. FASNY currently has more than 40,000 volunteer members. The Firefighters Association maintains the FASNY Firemen's Home and the adjacent FASNY Museum of Firefighting in Hudson NY. FASNY provides information, education and training for the volunteer fire and emergency medical services throughout New York State. FASNY strives to recognize the true champions of these services through numerous awards programs. They also recognize educators for their work in fire prevention education. Additionally, FASNY provides legislative representation that monitors and takes action on topics of importance to the services.

== Leadership ==
The current president is John Farrell Jr, the First Vice President is Edward Tase Jr, and the Second Vice President is Eugene J Perry Jr.

== Training and education ==
Each year, FASNY provides training and education programs around the state on a variety of topics. Experts present training to thousands of emergency service providers across the State of New York.

The purpose of the Training and Education Committee is threefold. First, the committee promotes FASNY as the voice of volunteer fire service in New York State. The second purpose is to increase the membership of FASNY. The final and most important purpose is to reduce the number of injuries and deaths of fire and EMS responders by providing training in safety and other fire and EMS related topics. This training takes place via workshops and programs covering a wide range of fields: administration, Chaplain's, Fire Police, Haz-Mat and emergency response.

== Legislation ==
The FASNY Legislative Committee confronts issues on behalf of its membership on a regular basis, striving to resolve them and provide solutions to future questions and concerns through advocacy.

== Awards ==
Each year, FASNY recognizes achievements in firefighting, EMS, teaching, fire safety education and community service. FASNY also helps recognize those volunteer firefighters who have achieved 50 years of service in New York State.

- EMS Provider of the Year
- FASNY Gerard J. Buckenmeyer Volunteer Scholarship
- Firefighter of the Year
- Firefighter Recognition 50/100 Year Award
- Fire Safety Educator of the Year
- Fire Service Community Achievement Award
- Golden Trumpet
- Teacher of the Year
- Youth Group of the Year

== Committees ==
- Chaplains Committee
- Fire Service Community Achievement Award Committee
- Scholarship Advisory Committee
- Emergency Medical Services Committee
- Fire Chiefs Committee
- Legislative Committee
- Standards and Codes Task Force Committee
- Membership Committee
- Training and Education Committee
- Firefighter of the Year Committee
- Member Services Committee
- Two Percent Tax Committee
- Fire Police Committee
- Public Relations Committee
- Ways and Means Committee
- Fire Prevention and Life Safety Committee
- Recruitment and Retention Committee
- Youth in the Fire Service Committee

== Firemen's Home ==
Licensed by the New York State Department of Health, the FASNY Firemen’s Home is a 126,000-square-foot (11,700 m^{2}) facility designed with the members’ comfort in mind. Specialized rehabilitation for both younger and older members includes health care, the camaraderie of socializing with fellow firefighters, and continued connections to firefighting activities.

== Federal Credit Union ==
The FASNY Federal Credit Union is chartered to serve the financial needs of members, immediate family members and employees of the Firemen's Association of the State of New York (FASNY) and the Firemen's Home, volunteer organizations such as fire departments, districts, fire companies, EMS and ambulance squads. Also included are members of LAFASNY, as well as employees, State, Department, and Personal members of the National Volunteer Fire Council (NVFC).

== Museum of Firefighting ==
The FASNY Museum of Firefighting is home to years of firefighting history in New York State. At the 51st State Firemen's Convention held in Hudson in 1923, a resolution signed by the Presidents and Secretaries of both the Volunteer Firemen's Association and the Exempt Firemen's Association of the City of New York said that if the State Association of the Firemen's Home would authorize the erection of a suitable building for a museum, four fire engines, one built in England in 1725, a Gooseneck more than one hundred years old, a piano-style engine 63 years old and a double-deck engine, would all be donated as the first pieces.

So, amid much anticipation, the Museum was built with a center hall 49 feet (15 m) long with two adjoining wings 24 feet (7.3 m) long, amounting to 2,600 square feet (240 m^{2}) of museum space. At 3 am on the morning of November 12, 1925, six large trucks brought the valuable collection up from New York City. The items were numbered and cataloged and then placed on display. The Museum was dedicated on Memorial Day 1926 with appropriate ceremonies.

In order to accommodate the numerous donations to the Museum, additions were necessary. The first addition was added in 1957, 31 years after the initial opening. The second addition came in 1972, with another expansion in 1989, and yet another in 2000 adding to the current size, totaling more than 50,000 square feet (4,600 m^{2}).

== History ==
In August 1872 as the parade moved along the main street of Auburn, N.Y., a state convention of a benevolent organization had just concluded one of its annual meetings and the members were passing review of the town folk. A group of local volunteer firemen stood on the curb watching, when one of them, whose name history does not record, spoke up, asking: “Why not have a firemen’s convention?” Little did any of those boys realize at the time that this chance remark would provide the incentive for the formation of what was to become one of the largest organizations in the state.

Word was passed around in the various fire companies that they were to meet soon to consider organizing the details for a permanent Firemen's Association. On September 2 the members of the Auburn fire department met at the courthouse. After “much free and uninterrupted discussion” it was agreed that each of the six fire companies at their next monthly meetings would select three members to act as a committee. This steering committee was to meet with the officers of the department on September 6 to present the report relative to forming a national firemen's association.

Three members each from Logan Hook and Ladder Co. No. 1, Neptune Hose Co. No. 1, Auburn Hose Co. No. 2, Niagara Hose Co. No. 3, Cayuga Hose Co. No. 4 and Union Hose Co. No. 5 were selected at the regular monthly meetings of the companies on September 4. This committee met the next evening and prepared a report, which was presented at the September 6th meeting of the entire fire department.

The report was in the form of a resolution stating that the object of the association be “co-operative in nature and with the view to improve the general government of the fire departments, the discussion and adoption of modern and improved fire apparatus, as well as a general interchange of ideas and a discussion of important questions pertaining to the various duties of firemen.”

The resolution also called for the appointment of an executive committee of three, with full power, and subordinate committees on finance, entertainment, and reception. It stated that at the convention there shall preside a president, six vice-presidents, one corresponding secretary and one recording secretary, also that each company in all fire departments be entitled to one representative in the convention, his expenses to be defrayed by his respective company.

The report was again read and adopted by clauses. On motion, the following persons were appointed to the respective committees named in the resolution:

Finance Committee George Milk-Logan and Ladder Co. Joseph H. Norris-Neptune Hose Co. George Friend-Auburn Hose Co. N.D. Kierst-Niagara Hose Co. Wright Milk-Cayuga Hose Co. Charles Tallowday-Union Hose Co.

Reception Committee George Smith-Logan Hook and Ladder Co. A. Sanford-Niagara Hose Co. Wright Milk-Cayuga Hose Co. Lewis Montgomery-Union Hose Co.

Entertainment William McEwan-Logan Hook and Ladder Co. Joseph Furness-Neptune Hose Co. H.P. Brown-Cayuga Hose Co.

A meeting of the executive committee was held on September 11. At this meeting it was decided that the first annual Convention of the Firemen's National Association be held in the City of Auburn on Tuesday and Wednesday, October 1 and 2, 1872. It was also decided that each fire company in every fire department in the United States be invited to send one delegate, and that the Chief Engineer of every department be requested to procure a list of the names of the delegates selected in his locality and forward the same to the secretary.

As the day for the opening of the Convention drew near, interest and enthusiasm in the project grew by leaps and bounds. Eleven states sent letters indicating that they would send delegates, though when the Convention opened, only Paterson, NJ and Des Moines, IA were represented. The business community was generous in supplying funds to be used “toward carrying out the purposes of the Committee of Arrangements and the Reception Committee for the hospitable entertainment of all delegates, who will be cared for with a welcome to ensure their best comfort.”

Plans for the first day called for the business of organizing a Firemen's National Convention and “addresses from good speakers.”

In the evening, a Grand Inauguration Ball would be held at the Academy of Music. The second day would be devoted to a parade and amusements. Visiting steam fire engines, hose and other companies would compete in tests, and a trial of the city water works would be given. As a special feature, arrangements were made for a half-mile race between Hose Co. No. 7 of Ithaca and Niagara Hose Co. No. 3 of Auburn.

Invitations were sent to Syracuse, Ithaca and Oswego inviting fire engine companies to be present with their apparatus. For music, the 49th Regiment Band was engaged. The committee let it be known that contributions were being solicited for dinners of the visiting firemen and that baskets of refreshments of any kind should be left at the Academy of Music by 10:00 a.m. on the second day of the Convention.

The morning session began an hour later than the scheduled time period. Only two pieces of business were enacted—the report of the Business Committee and the appointment of the first Executive Committee.

Mr. Smith of Oswego, chairman of the Business Committee presented his report in the form of a Resolution, the main points being "That the firemen of Auburn did a wise and beneficent act in organizing the Convention" and that it was found upon assembling that only a portion of this and other states were represented, "Therefore, Be It Resolved: That this body be known as the Firemen's Association of the State of New York."

== See also ==
- Women in firefighting
