= United Firefighters Union of Australia =

- Founded: 1 August 1990
- Headquarters: Fitzroy, Victoria
- Location: Australia
- Members: ▲9,017 (as at 31 December 2024)
- Key people: Leigh Hills; National President Peter Marshall; National Secretary
- Affiliations: Australian Council of Trade Unions
- Website: www.ufua.asn.au

Officially registered on 1 August 1990, the United Firefighters Union of Australia (UFUA) represents over 7000 paid firefighters.

Branches of the United Firefighters Union of Australia are as follows:

- UFU Australian Capital Territory
- UFU Aviation
- UFU South Australia
- UFU Tasmania
- UFU Victoria
- UFU Western Australia

== UFUA New South Wales union split ==
Following a dispute over National Office finances, the UFU NSW branch (with 6000 members, the largest branch) restarted as an independent union and had won over 85 percent of all NSW paid firefighters by late 2010.
