= Wildfire suppression equipment and personnel =

Wildfire suppression equipment and personnel is part of the science of fire fighting focusing on the use of specialized equipment, training and tactics to effectively control, surround and eventually extinguish a natural cover fire. There are several specially designed tools that through their function and user training, perform specialized tasks that are specific to natural cover firefighting. This is used together in conjunction with the general understanding of the behavior of fire to form a viable plan of attack.

== Personnel ==
PPE or personal protective equipment is generally standardized for a certain type of team or crew. Smokejumpers for example require more protective equipment because of their method of delivery into the fire. Ordinarily, all firefighters regardless of assignment, require durable fire recommended eight inch (203 mm) minimum boots, gloves, Nomex pants and shirt (typically green pants and a yellow shirt), a hard hat (sometimes full brim), Walkie-talkie, potable water, eye protection (goggles) and a fire shelter.

In the U.S., a firefighter's credentials and level of training is shown on their red card. For example, a sawyer will have a feller rating on their red card designating the capacity size tree they have been trained to fell. A firefighter trained as an EMT may have this certification on their card. Classes under the National Wildfire Coordinating Group (NWCG) and management qualification standards under the Interagency Fire Program Management (IFPM) are generally shown as well. At a minimum, the passing of the pack test is displayed showing the individual is physically able to perform appropriate duties.

There are currently 2 wildland firefighter ratings. Firefighter Type 2, which is the basic firefighter qualification, and is required for most operational positions. The Firefighter Type 2 requires several introductory classes as well as a practical day in the field. The dispatch code for a Firefighter Type 2 is FFT2. The second rating is Firefighter Type 1. The Firefighter 1 rating requires advanced courses in wildland firefighting as well as acceptable performance as a FFT2. Firefighter Type 1 is considered to be a senior and seasoned wildland Firefighter. The dispatch code for Firefighter Type 1 is FFT1.

=== Hand crews ===
Typically, wildland firefighting organizations will use large handcrews of 20 or more people who travel in vehicles to the fire incident. Although these crews can vary above or below 20 firefighters, they are generally called twenty-man crews. The designations of these crews in the U.S., defined in large portion by training, are as follows:

Crews
Type I Interagency Hotshot Crew
Type II Initial Attack (IA) Crew
Type II Crew
Type III Crew (none currently in service)

Some personnel are organized into fast attack teams typically consisting of five to eight personnel. Similar to the larger crews, they travel by vehicle.

=== Smokejumpers ===
Smokejumpers are highly skilled firefighters specially trained in wildfire suppression tactics. They parachute into remote areas from aircraft to combat wildfires and are equipped to work in remote areas for extended periods of time with little logistical support.

=== Helitack ===
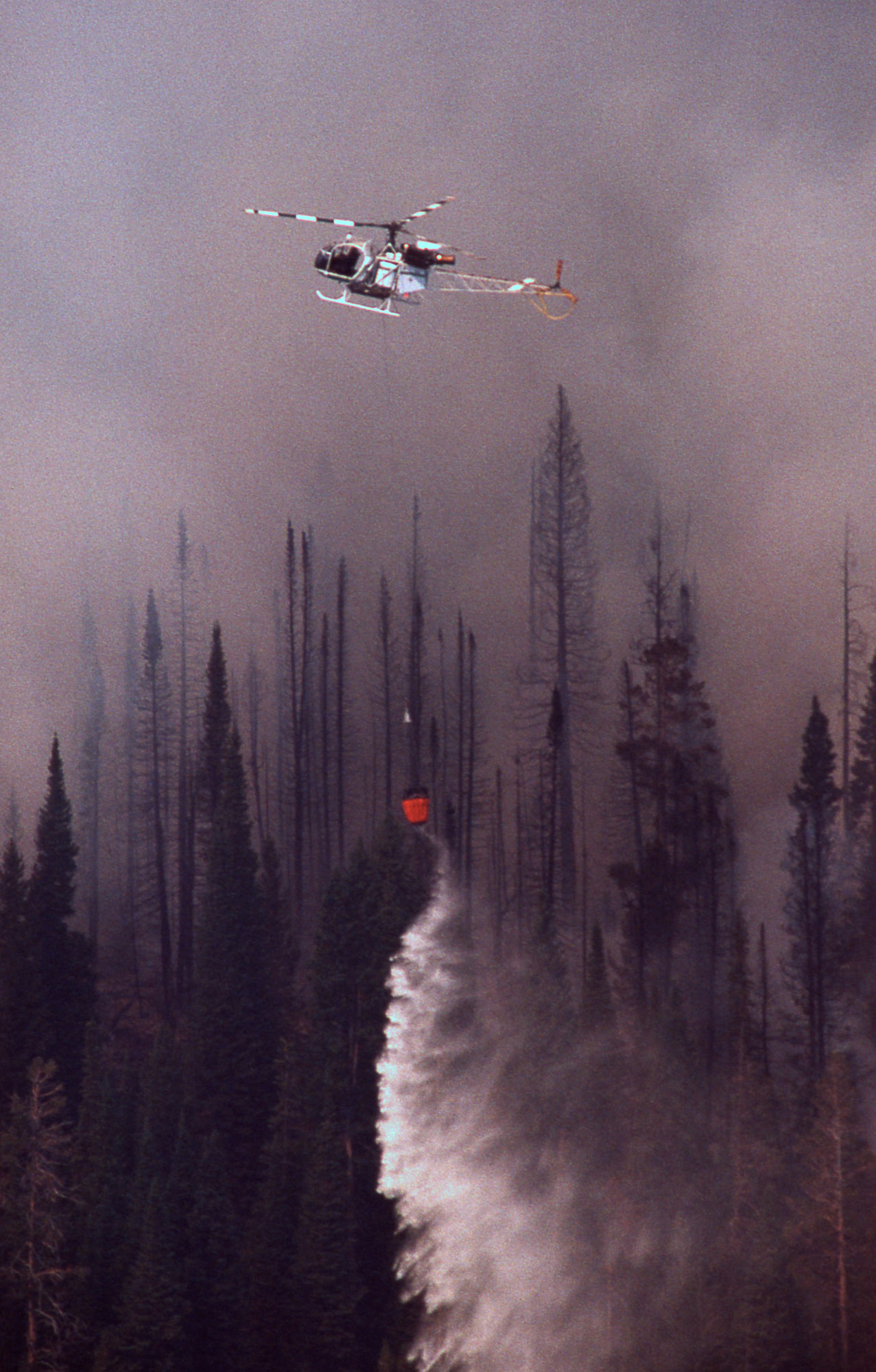
Water drop from helicopter, NPS photo by Harlan Kredit.

The use of helicopter-delivered fire resources varies by agency. Often, helitack crews perform duties similar to other initial attack crews. Two or three firefighters will be dispatched to a newly reported fire. Helitack crews are usually used for initial attack on fires that are difficult for other firefighters to access, or on extended fires that require aerial support in the form of water drops, cargo delivery, crew shuttling, or reconnaissance. A typical initial attack response by a helitack crew involves flying to the fire via helicopter and spending one to three days (although sometimes much longer) putting the fire out before hiking to the nearest road for pickup.

=== Rappellers ===
A highly effective way to fight wilderness fire when no roads are nearby is to have wildland firefighters rappel from a helicopter. These firefighters then take suppressive action on the fire or clear a safe landing zone to receive additional firefighters if the fire is too large. Rappellers usually carry 30 pounds of personal gear plus up to 400 pounds of fire gear which is lowered down to them from their helicopter. Rappelling heights can range from 30 feet (in tall, continuous brush) to 300 feet (in timber). When suppression is complete on rappel fires, ground transport is typically arranged to pick up the firefighters at the nearest road. These crews carry chainsaws, hand tools, radios, and can even have 75-US-gallon (280 L) water bags, known as blivets, flown in to help fight the fire. When not rappelling, the crew works as a helitack crew and can fly or hike to any regular fire.

== Vehicles ==
=== Engines ===
- Wildland fire engine

=== Crew transport ===
- Buggy or crummy
- Crew bus

=== Tenders ===
When water is required to refill a fire engine, water delivery is vital. The typical water tender carries 1,200 US gallons (4,500 L) of water to support fire engines. In addition to supplying fire engines directly, tenders may fill water reservoirs for bucket-dropping helicopters when a lake or reservoir is not nearby.

=== Heavy equipment ===
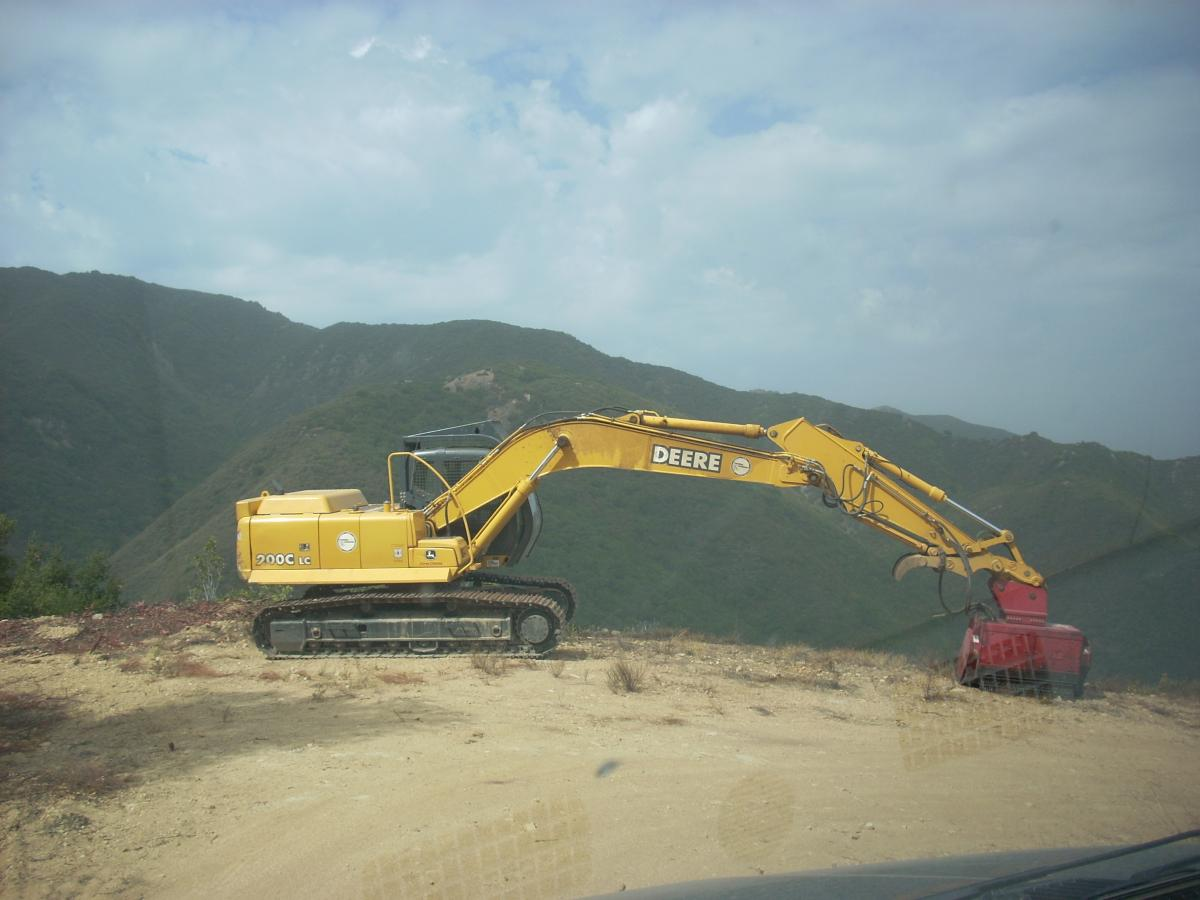
Masticator, which chews through brush and small trees, on the Zaca Fire

Heavy equipment's primary function of wildfire suppression is through the application of heavy construction style equipment to move large amounts or earth or remove vegetation. Fuel breaks, safety zones, firelines and access to areas that maybe previously were inaccessible may be made. Bulldozers and tractor plows are examples.

== Air suppression ==
In addition to aircraft being used for deploying ground personnel, firefighting groups may utilize helicopters and fixed-wing airplanes specially equipped for use in aerial firefighting to douse areas that are inaccessible to vehicles with water and/or flame retardant chemicals.

=== Fixed-wing airplanes ===
- Airtankers
- Lead aircraft
- Smokejumper transport aircraft
- Airlift aircraft

=== Rotary-wing aircraft ===
- Helicopters (helitack & rappel)
- Helicopter (water delivery)

== Hand tools ==
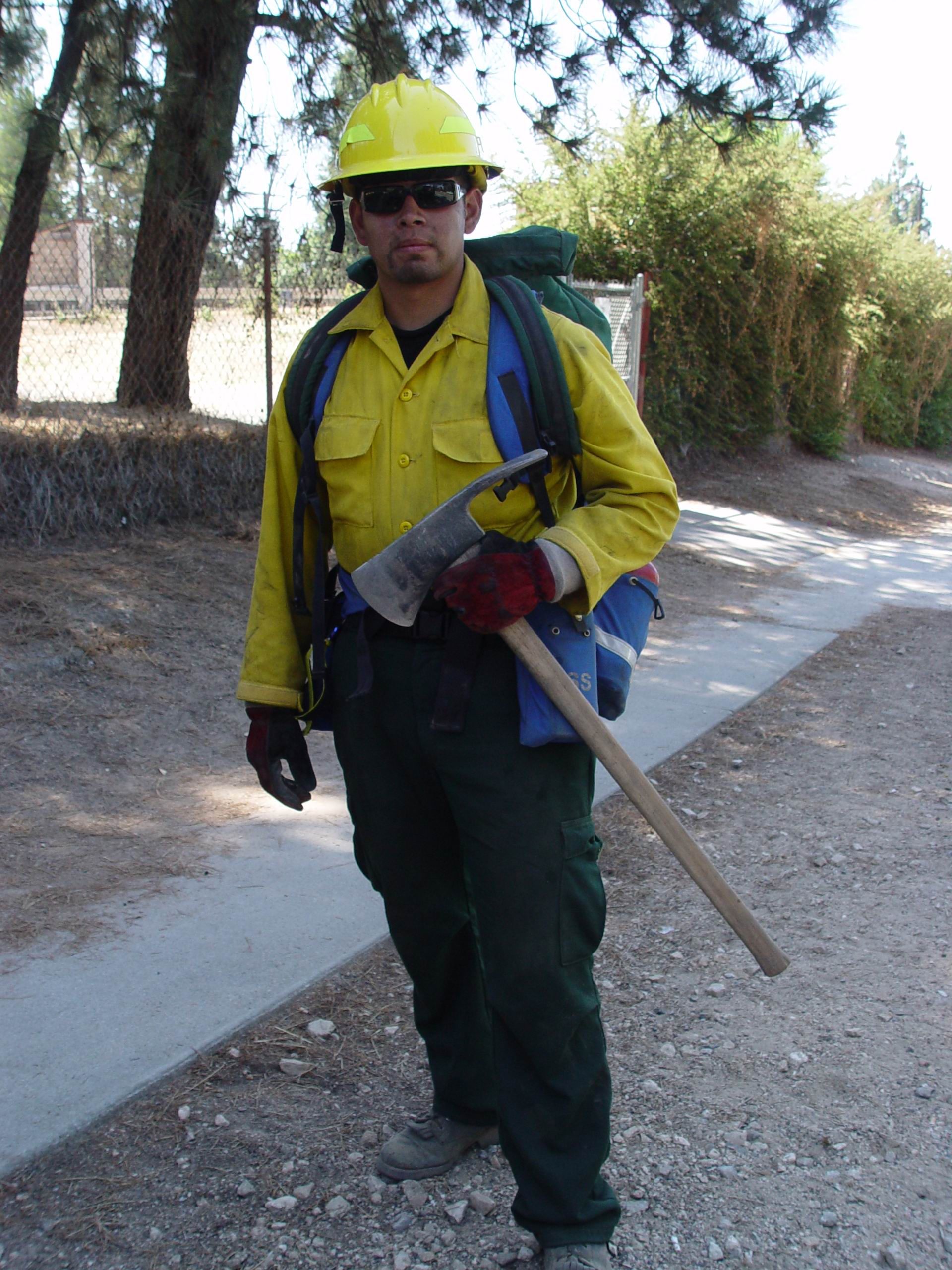
Holding a Pulaski, a wildland firefighter from the Angeles National Forest responds to a fire in Altadena, California on July 9, 2006.

A number of tools are used in wildland firefighting. Some examples include:

- Driptorch
- Fusee
- McLeod (tool)
- Pulaski (tool)
- Fire flapper (tool)
- Quick Release Firehose Clamp (tool)
- Hazel hoe
- Chainsaw
- Shovel
- Very pistol
- Hand held thermal detectors
- Sling psychrometer
- Portable bladder bag
- Two-way radio

== See also ==
- Glossary of wildfire terms
- Wildland Firefighter Foundation
- International Association of Wildland Fire
- Wildfire suppression
