= Rake (tool) =

Agricultural tool used for moving soil

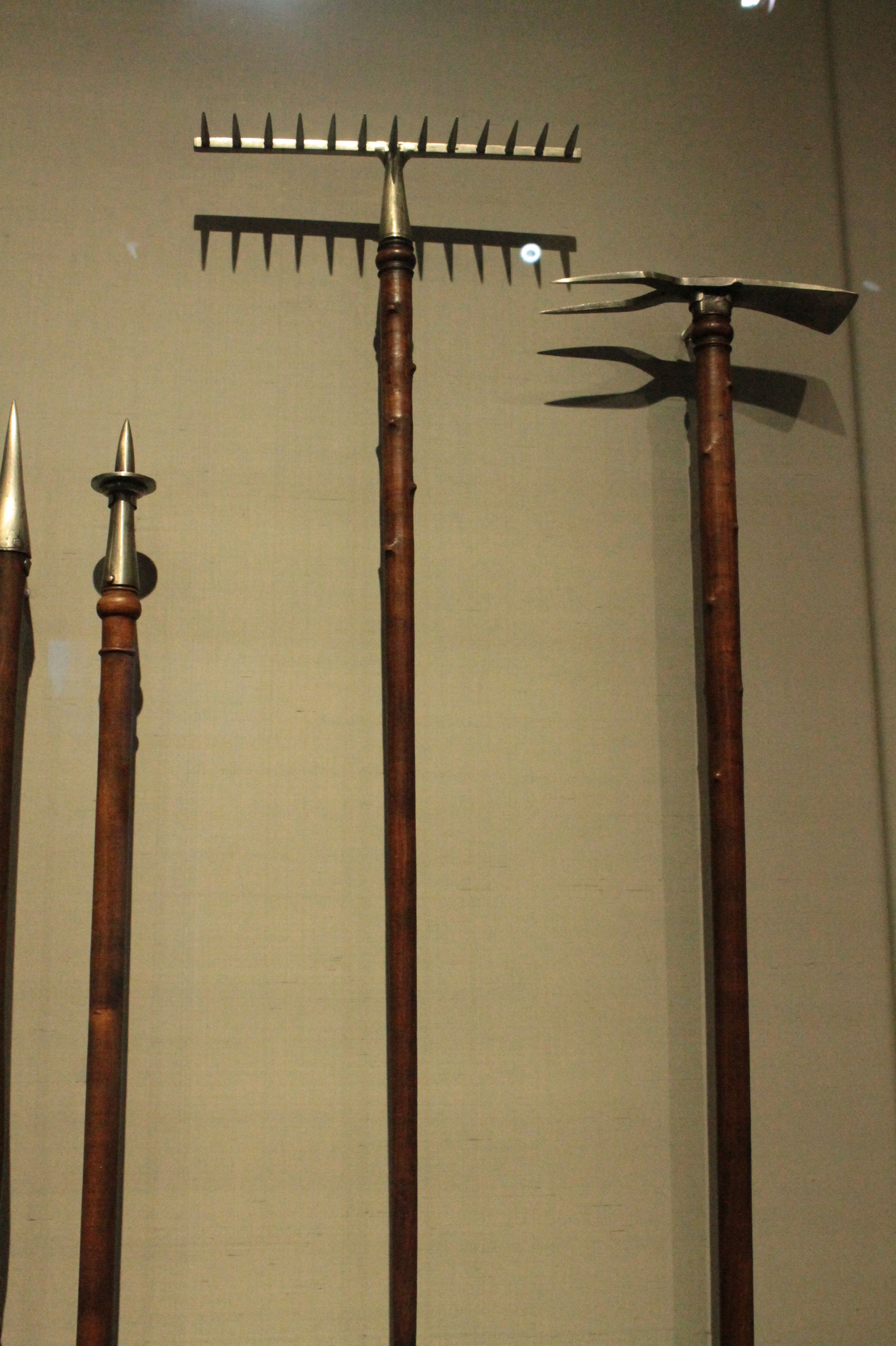
Garden rake made from turned pear tree wood, made 1560, Rustkammer Museum, Dresden

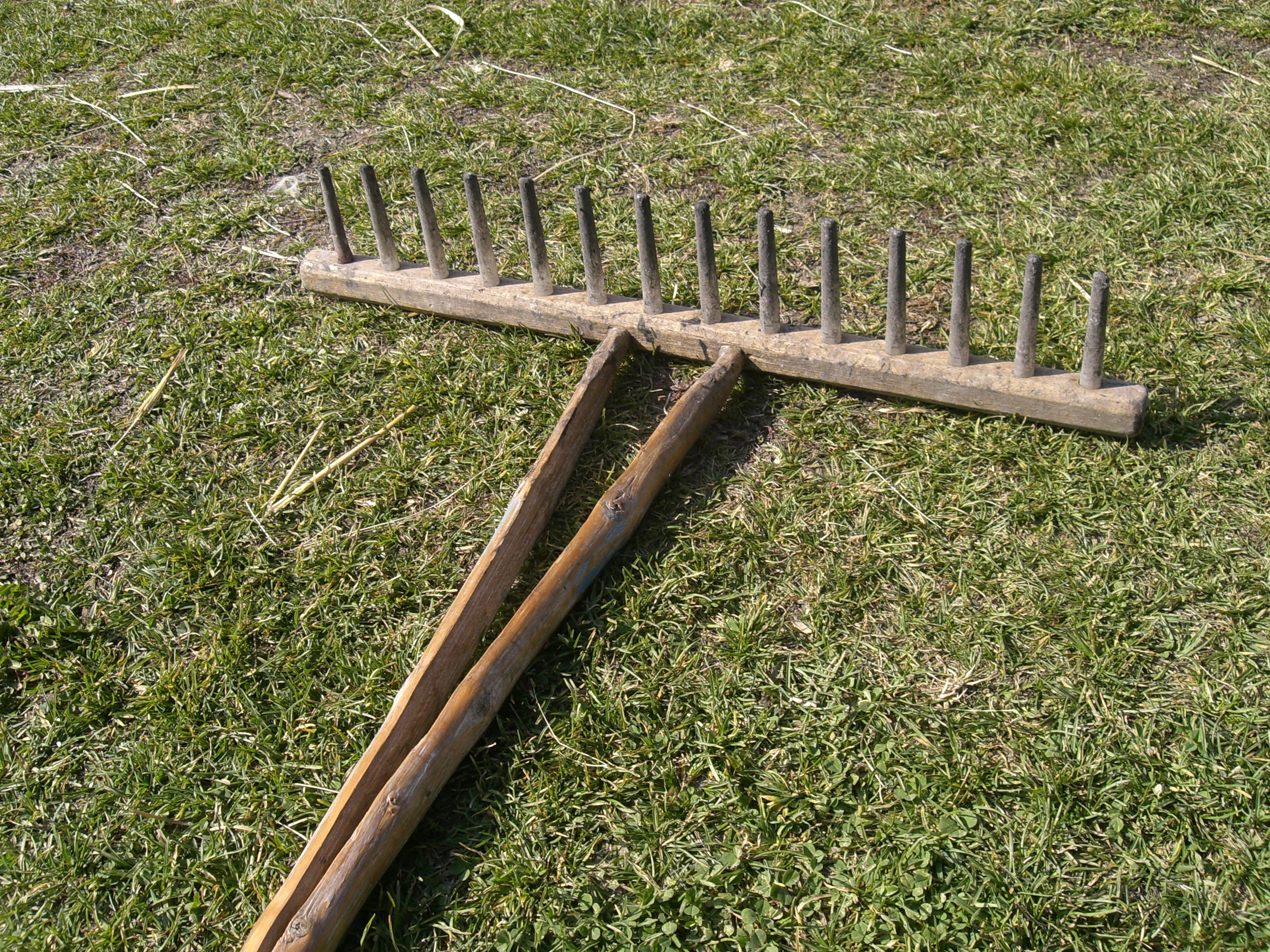
Wooden hand-rake

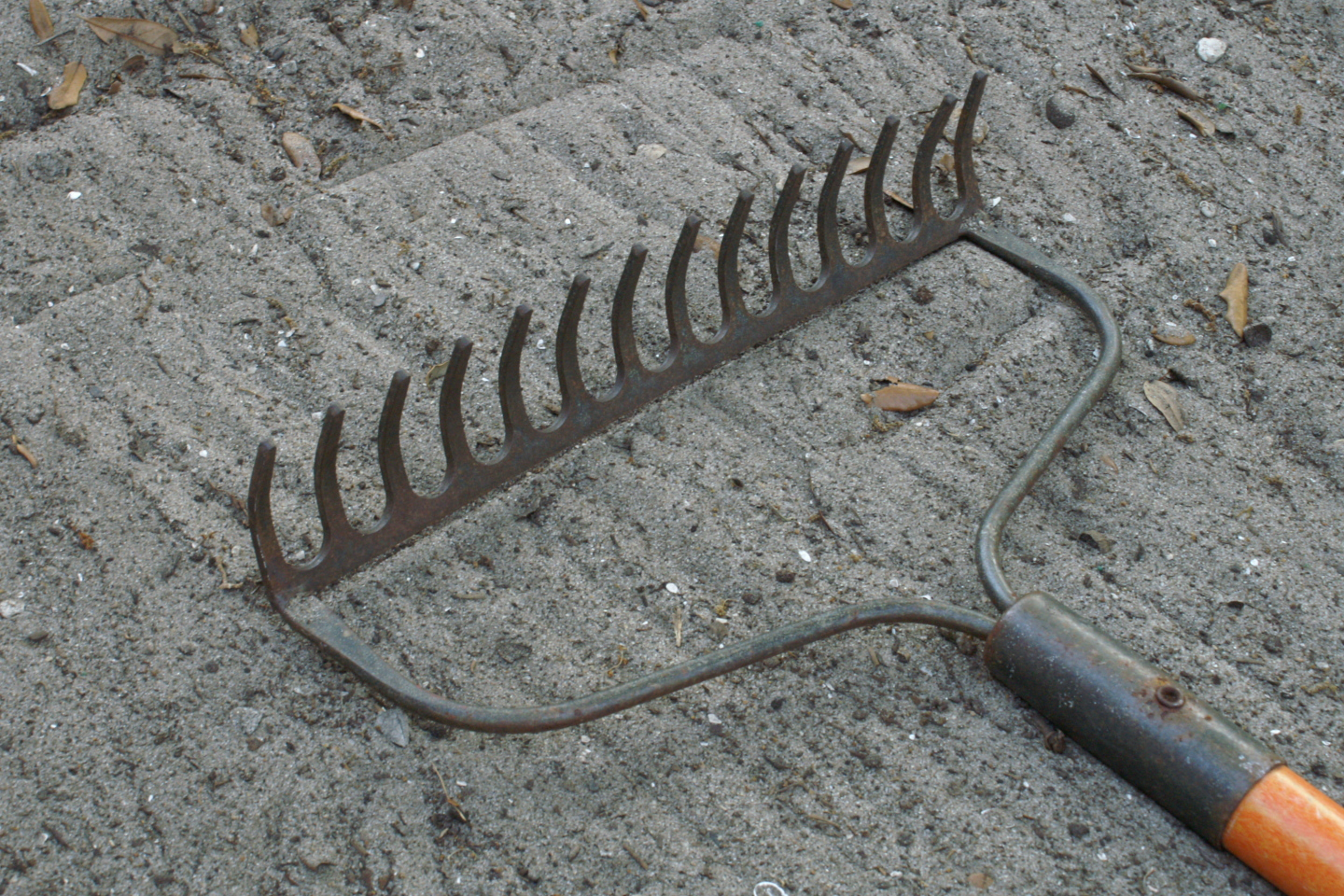
A heavy-duty bow rake for soil and rocks

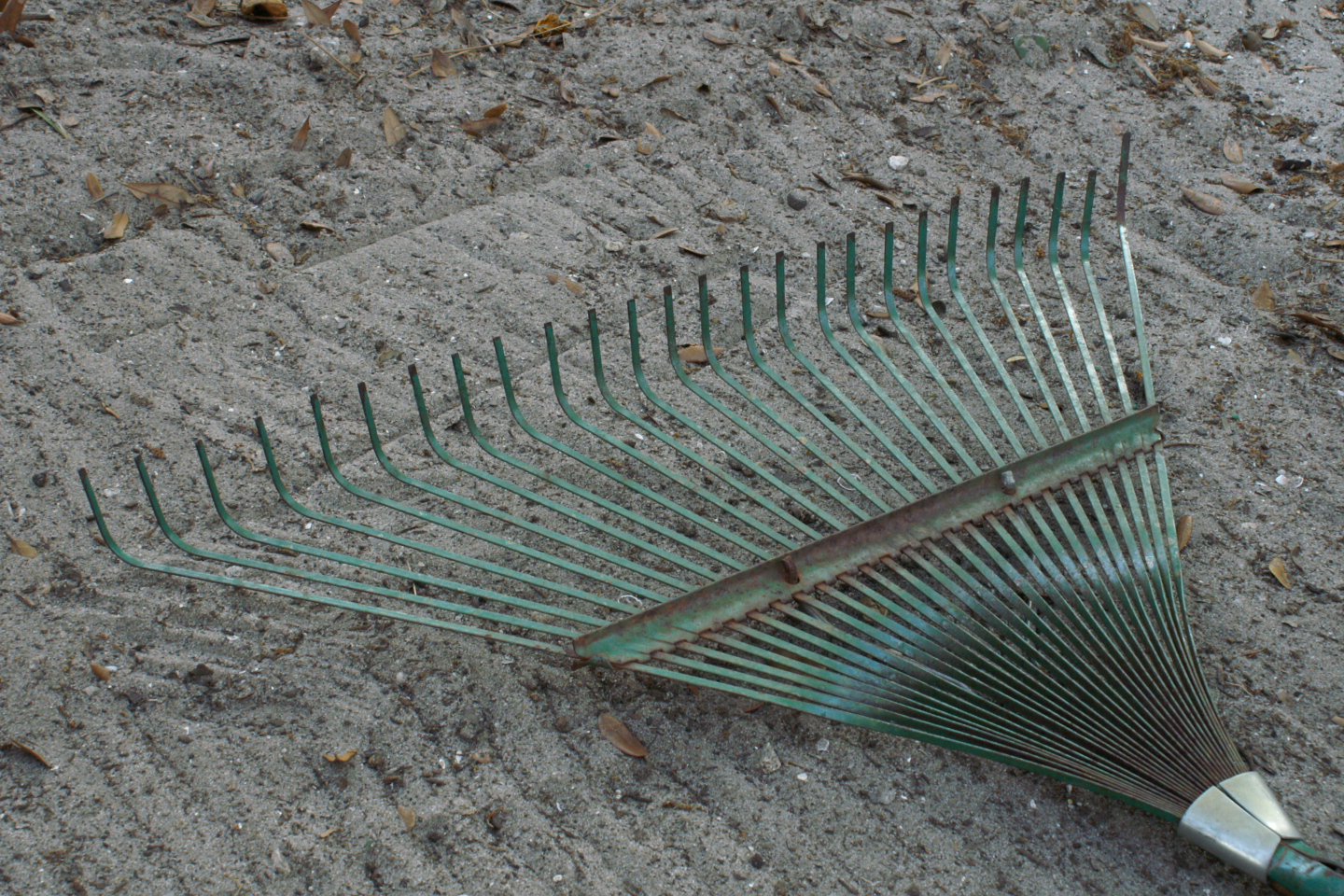
A light-duty leaf rake for leaves and grasses

A rake (Old English raca, cognate with Dutch hark, German Rechen or Harke, from the root meaning 'to scrape together', 'heap up') is a broom for outside use; a versatile horticultural implement consisting of a toothed bar fixed transversely to a handle, or tines fixed to a handle, and used to collect leaves, hay, grass, and in gardening, for loosening the soil, light weeding and to make furrows, mounds and levelling, removing dead grass from lawns, and generally for purposes performed in agriculture by the harrow. Depending on purpose, their materials and form will vary greatly.

Large mechanized versions of rakes are used in farming, called hay rakes, are built in many different forms (e.g. star-wheel rakes, rotary rakes). Non mechanized farming may be done with various forms of a hand rake. Rakes can be a mechanical component of a threshing machine.

== History ==
Rakes have been discovered dated as far back as 1100 B.C. in China. These early rakes were made of wooden tines attached to a wooden handle. Designs similar to the modern rake date back as far as the 16th century, when a rake appeared in Journey to the West. The garden rake was patented by Edmund Brown in 1874. He described it as, "An automatically clearing attachment for iron tooth door-yard rakes." In 1905, an experimental cross between a snow shovel and a rake was invented by Richard Franklin Lawson. The modern rake was created in 1929 by Camille J. Rocquin, which was metal and had prongs most similar to modern-day rakes, It was not until the 1970's that plastic rakes would begin being used.

== Types ==
=== Modern rakes ===
Modern hand-rakes usually have steel, plastic, or bamboo teeth or tines, though historically they have been made with wood or iron. The handle is typically a ~1.5 metres (5 ft) haft made of wood, bamboo, steel or fiberglass. Plastic rakes are generally lighter weight and lower cost. Because they can be fabricated in widths of greater dimensions they are more suitable for leaves which have recently been deposited. Metal tined rakes are better suited for spring raking when the debris is often wet or rotted and can best be collected when the metal tines penetrate to the thatch layer.

=== Leaf rakes ===
Leaf rakes are used to gather leaves and to cut grass and debris. They have long, flat teeth bent into an L-shape and fanned out from the point of attachment. This permits some flexibility to allow the teeth to conform to terrain, while also being light to minimize damage to vegetation. Telescoping leaf rakes allow the teeth to be withdrawn by sliding a movable fixture point up the shaft.

=== Garden rakes ===
Garden rakes typically have steel teeth and are intended for heavier use in soil and larger debris. They have long, stiff teeth which must be able to withstand abrasion and bending forces.

=== Bow rakes ===
Bow rakes are a subset of garden rakes which separate the handle and bar with a bow-shaped extension which allows the flat back of the bar to be used for levelling and scraping. These may have somewhat finer and shorter teeth and can perform many gardening and landscape tasks, and due to their more costly construction are likely to be a professional tool. Alternatively, a second set of differently shaped teeth may be added to the back of the bar.

=== Landscaping rakes ===
A landscaping rake resembles an oversized garden rake, with a longer head. A landscaping rake serves the purpose of smoothing and grading extensive soil areas or earth areas. It distinguishes itself from traditional leaf rakes or soil clod breakers due to its width. Typically, a landscaping rake has a head measuring 30 to 38 inches or even broader, featuring steel tines set at a 90-degree angle to the handle.

=== Stone rakes ===
A stone rake is similar to a landscape rake, but with a narrower head of about 18 to 28 inches and is constructed from steel or aluminum. The head sits at a 90-degree angle to the handle.

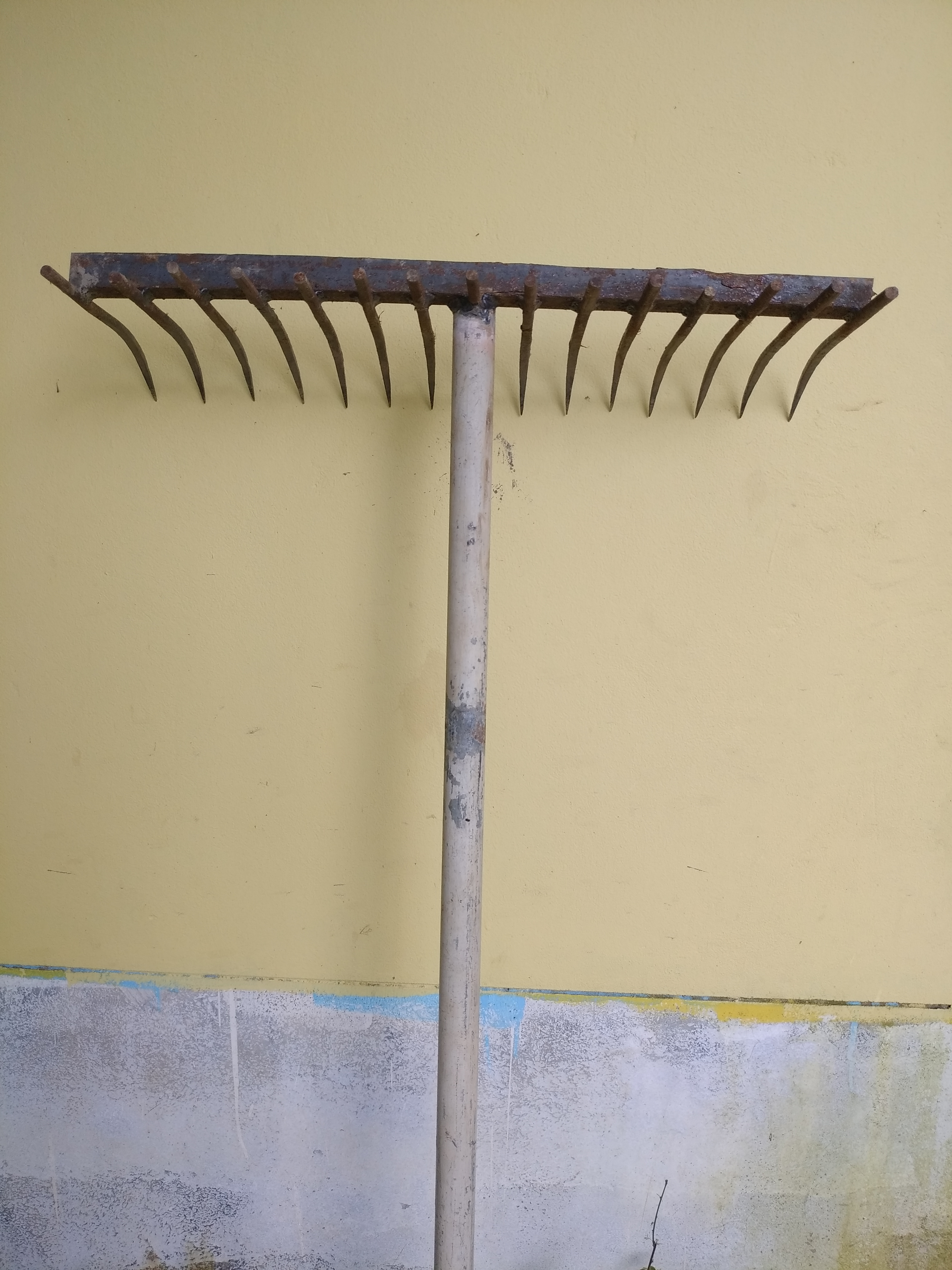
Hand Rakes made of Steel use for Agriculture

=== Thatch rakes ===
A thatch rake's primary function is to eliminate thatch—an organic layer situated between the lawn and the soil surface. Diverging from the typical structure of rakes, a thatch rake is equipped with sharp blades on both sides of its head. One side breaks up the thatch, while the other side facilitates its removal. When left unaddressed, a dense thatch layer can impede the penetration of air and sunlight to the base of grass blades, potentially leading to lawn diseases. The removal of a substantial thatch layer, particularly if it measures 1/4-inch thick or thicker, proves beneficial for enhancing the overall health and vitality of the lawn. A reliable thatch rake stands out as a tool for performing this task. A heavy rake is for conditioning and dethatching soil as well as moving larger pieces of debris. Most weeds have weaker and shallower roots than grass and thus dethatching along with (afterward) necessary sunlight, fertilizer and seed, and if later necessary any remedial chemicals, makes for a good crop of grass. Larger tools (or lawnmower attachments) are more often used for large areas of de-thatching or soil preparation.

=== Concrete rakes ===
A concrete rake is a heavy-duty tool with a flat edge for spreading and smoothing wet concrete and a curved side for scooping. Made of durable materials, it is used for leveling concrete surfaces in construction.

=== Roof rakes/Snow rakes ===
A roof rake features a long handle and a flat, scoop-like head for removing debris or snow from rooftops, preventing gutter clogs and structural damage, especially in snowy regions.

=== Berry-picking rakes ===
Berry-picking rakes are tools for collecting berries.

=== Fire rakes ===
A fire rake is a heavy-duty variant of the normal rake used for fire prevention, but can also be used for other various tasks, such as cutting roots.

== Cultural associations ==
If a rake lies in the ground with the teeth facing upwards, as shown on the top picture, and someone accidentally steps on the teeth, the rake's handle can swing rapidly upwards, colliding with the victim's face. This is often seen in slapstick comedy such as the Pink Panther Strikes Again and cartoons, such as Tom and Jerry and The Simpsons episode "Cape Feare", wherein a series of rakes become what Sideshow Bob describes as his "arch-nemesis".

There is a Russian saying "to step on the same rake" (Russian: наступить на те же грабли), which means "to repeat the same silly mistake", also the word "rake" (Russian: грабли) in Russian slang means "troubles".

In the 16th century Chinese novel Journey to the West, the major character Zhu Bajie wields a rake, his "Nine-toothed rake" (Jiǔchǐdīngpá), as his signatory weapon.

In Japanese folklore, the Kumade (熊手, lit. 'bear hand') is a rake; a smaller, handheld, decorated version is sold as an engimono, often during Tori-no-Ichi (lit. "Rooster markets) which take place throughout Japan each November, and is believed to be able to, literally, rake-in good-fortune and/or rake-out bad-fortune for the user.

== See also ==
- Aeration
- Besom
- Fire flapper
- Fire rake
- McLeod
- Pulaski
- Soil
