= Economic reforms under Peter the Great =

1682–1725 Russian reforms

Peter the Great became the new Tsar of Russia in 1682 and ruled until 1725. During his rule, Peter brought many reforms in order to open the window to Europe for Russia. Economic reforms played an important role in the transformation of Russia. With these economic reforms, Russia achieved a good standing among the European countries in areas such as manufacturing, trade, and military. These economic reforms would boost Russia well into the 18th century, which were aimed to provide highly positive benefits for the Russian population.

== Before Peter the Great ==
Russia was the largest state of the Old World at the beginning of the 17th century. With a population of only 13 million people, its territory spanned from the Arctic Ocean to the Caspian Sea. The majority of the population was located in the centre and on the North of the European border. At the end of the 17th century, Russia became a multinational state, due to Ukraine and the whole Siberia becoming a part of its already large area. It was populated by people of many cultures and religions. Orthodox Christians, Muslims, Buddhists and Pagans all lived on the large Asian lands of Russia.

=== Economic development ===
The multicultural presence became noticeable, not only because of Asia but also because of Europe. At that time, Russia was trying to become closer with Europe, but it also had interests in the East. That resulted in the duality of Russian economic and political development. Many western European countries such as the Netherlands, England and France made a significant progress in the area of a market economy. For Russia, it was important to overcome slow social development as compared to Europe. The Russian economy was weak, with poorly developed industry. One of the major weaknesses was the national economy management system.

When speaking about Russia's development, it is important to mention serfdom. Europe was in the process of stopping serfdom, and some countries managed to stop it completely. Serfdom was only growing in Russia. This resulted in Russia falling behind in many areas of social life, creating massive impacts on the population.

Another big factor of Russia's poor economic development was the education system, which was at the very early stages. At schools, only grammar and Holy writings were taught. So there were no specialisations in engineering, manufacturing, medicine, and many other important fields that play a crucial role in countries economic development. It is said that Russia's education system was behind for approximately 5 centuries. It is also important to note that the printed materials were mostly of spiritual content. Due to the poor education system, it was hard to train specialists. For, example there were no Russian doctors in the country. There were only foreign doctors, and they mostly served the members of the royal families.

There was a strong necessity to solve many problems with the economy, army, education, and culture, as Russia has exhausted all of the possibilities to develop separately, outside of the European civilisation. Moreover, in the middle of the 17th century, there were civilian uproars in several major cities such as Moscow and Novgorod. In the years 1670-1671 there was a peasant war, which spread across significant territories in the south of Russia. As a result, the unity of the society was weakened. Russia was in need of radical changes.

== The reforms ==
In the year 1682, Peter the Great became the new Tsar of Russia. His name is tightly associated with the beginning of the fundamental reforms in the country. For eighteen months Peter the Great traveled throughout Europe with the goal of studying the economic and political structures of the countries he visited. Moreover, Peter the Great personally studied several professions related to the shipbuilding in the Netherlands and England. The knowledge he obtained during those years would later assist him with the upcoming reforms in Russia.

Starting from January 1, 1700, Russia made a switch to a new calendar, which symbolised the beginning of the reforms throughout the whole country.

Almost the entire period under the rule of Peter the Great consisted of military campaigns and conquests. His military activity was a big part of the reforms. In fact, the first reforms were the military reforms, which were very significant for Russia. The fundamental reorganisation of the country's armed forces led to the establishment of the new army, and a powerful fleet. This led to the expansion and strengthening of the country. As a result, Russia won the Great Northern War against Sweden, and acquired the path to the Baltic Sea and returned its land.

The Russian economy also needed innovative solutions. When Peter the Great became the Tsar, the state treasury was in a bad condition. Peter the Great needed more money in order to realise his personal projects. The first major task for the state was to find new sources of income. Peter knew that in order to improve the financial condition of the country, there was a necessity to increase the national economy. The economic policy was directed towards the development of the industries and trade. Peter supported the development in those areas in many ways. The economic leap which took part in the economic reform of Peter the Great would show a significant development for Russia, yet also consequences for the industrialisation of the Soviet Union.

The first 10 years of the 18th century can be seen as the period of active state involvement in supporting private enterprises and the economy as a whole. The practice of transferring of state enterprises to private owners, foreigners or industrial companies became widespread. The state also sponsored the training of the workforce, transport of the equipment to the factories, and hiring of the specialists. For some very important industries, more privileges were provided. Those industries would get free land for building their factories. Through the concept of mercantilism, this aimed to benefit Russia's wealth as a whole nation.

From the start of the 18th century, began the manufacturing period in the national economy. The manufacturing system became more prominent than the handcrafted production. In the first quarter of the 18th century, there was a significant growth in manufacturing in the country. At the end of 17th century there were around 20 fabrics, and in the years 1720-1725 there were 205 fabrics, from which 90 belonged to the treasury and 115 to the private equity. There were around 69 metallurgical enterprises. There were also enterprises specialising in wood work, gunpowder, leather, glass production, paper, porcelain and other areas. The mining industry was also under active development. Many expeditions were made in the search of natural resources. When silver was found, a new silver melting factory was built. Overall there was a great success in the metallurgical industry. Between the years 1700 - 1725 the amount of cast iron produced increased by 5 times, and by the year 1750 it reached 2 million pounds. Half of that amount was exported. The import of weapons stopped in the year 1712 since the quality of the produced weapons within the country was the same as abroad. The fast growth of the metallurgical industry allowed for the production of several thousands of cannons.

The quality of metallurgical products became high, and it became used for export extensively. Eventually, Russia became the first in producing Cast Iron in Europe. Apart from extensive manufacturing in Russian economy, there was also a large artisan sector in the cities, and home craft in villages. They mostly produced fabrics, leather, shoes, pottery, saddles and other products. There was also growth in production of sails and clothes, that were used for the fleet and the army. Sugar factories were built for the first time. Foreign technicians were given special rights, and Russian citizens were sent to Europe in order to improve their skills. Russian entrepreneurs were also given more rights, such as using peasants as a workforce, and owning land. Having granted entrepreneurs with benefits, Peter the Great established strict control over them. He was aware of all industrial affairs, and personally overlooked their quality and performance.

Peter the Great was aiming to perform the internal reforms in Russia, in order to bring it to the European level. Apart from military and diplomatic problems, he was concerned with the management structure of the state. Between the years 1700–1725, he confirmed around 3 thousand laws, related to economics, civil life, and management structure of the state. Only in the last 7 years under the rule of Peter the Great, did the various institutions achieve the normative. Radical management reforms were made in order to strengthen the absolute monarchy. The goal was to create the vertical administrative structure, completely ruled by the supreme power.

=== The Ranking System ===
Peter's reforms were undoubtedly directed against the old Boyar aristocracy. There was no wish to change and to strengthen the centralized power. Peter relied on the local nobility, which supported the strengthening of the absolute monarchy. In the year 1714, Peter issued a decree of unified heritage, by which there was a final merger of two forms of feudal land ownership in the uniform legal concept known as the "immovable property". Both types were made equal in all aspects. Estates were inherited by only one of the sons, usually the eldest. The rest of the children would inherit money and other property. They were also obliged to enter the military or civilian service. The introduction of rankings in 1722 was closely connected to the new decree. All positions of the state and military services were divided into 14 ranks, where 14 was the lowest rank, and 1 was the highest rank. People had to go up the ranks in order to get promoted. Nobles were most interested in the introduction of this order since they got the ability to reach the highest state ranks and join the authorities.

=== Internal and external trade ===
In order to maintain and improve the internal market, the commerce collegium was created in the year 1719. Trade and entrepreneurship is the major pillars supporting the economy of a country. Peter the Great tried to protect the Russian economy in any way. He aimed that the amount of exported goods would overcome the amount of imported goods from the abroad. At the end of his rule, he achieved that goal. The amount of exported goods was double the amount of imported goods. The import rate was maintained smaller by introducing higher customs prices. There were also special conditions for the internal trade. The traders were encouraged to unite in the western manner. In order to expand the trade borders of Russia, Peter the Great created the trade fleet.

In order to improve the trading routes, the state, for the first time in history, began the building of channels. The land roads were very bad, and it slowed down the development of the regular trade connections.

In the year 1704, Peter the Great initiated the monetary reform. The silver rubles, also referred to just rubles, were produced. Before Peter the Great rubles were used as a counting unit.

There were significant changes in the structure of the external trade. At the beginning of the 18th century, it was common to export agricultural products and raw materials. In the year 1725, it was much more common to export manufactured products such as iron, linen canvas, and sails. As for the import, it was mostly luxury items for the rich families, and also colonial products such as tea, coffee, sugar, and wine. Starting from the year 1712, Russia completely stopped buying weapons from Europe.

The development of the internal trade was largely slowed down by the lack of metals necessary to produce coins. The majority of money turnover consisted of small copper coins. The silver coins were quite large and were often cut into several parts, each part having its own turnover. As part of the monetary reform in the year 1704, a new, simple decimal system was introduced. Instead of the weight, each coin was valued by its decimal number. Eventually, Europe also started using this system, but it was much later. Minting of coins became the unconditional monopoly of the state. There were also gold coins, but they were mostly used for ceremonial purposes, as a reward to the soldiers. The ban on export of precious metals was introduced. It became more common to search for the precious metals such as silver within the country. The monetary system was further strengthened by the increase in export, and a positive balance in the internal trade.

In the first ten years of the 18th century, there was a geographical change in trade centres. In the 17th century Arkhangelsk played the major role in the trade with the west. Later it was replaced by St. Petersburg, and then by Riga. The trading routes with Persia and India were carried through the Volga river, Astrakhan and the Caspian Sea.

=== Agriculture ===
The agriculture during Peter the Great did not face any major reforms. In the year 1721, there was a new decree that forbid the use of sickle during the harvest period. Instead, the braids and rake had to be used. This switch resulted in an improved efficiency during the field works. The harvesting periods became shorter, and the losses during collection were minimised. Mulberry and fruit trees made an appearance in Russian agriculture for the first time. Medical plants, grapes, and tobacco also started to be grown. New types of cattle were also introduced.

=== Change in financial system ===
Due to the war with Sweden, building the fleet, factories, channels, and cities, there was a large spending. The Russian budget was at a critical stage. There was a task to find all possible revenue from the taxes. Special groups of people, known as the tax collectors, were formed. Their goal was to find the new objects of taxation. Starting from the year 1704 there was a great amount of new taxes introduced. Taxes for the mills, bees, pipes, making of hats and shoes, and many others. Those were so-called small taxes. There were monopolies on several goods such as resin, rhubarb, glue, salt, tobacco, chalk, and fish fat. Those monopolies also had to pay taxes. After the rule of Peter the Great, a lot of those small taxes were eventually canceled.

== The outcome ==
As a result of the reforms under Peter the Great, Russia managed to take a good standing among the European states. It became a powerful nation with an effective economy, strong fleet and army, and well developed science and culture. All of the reforms occurred through violence, through suffering of people, through breaking the traditions, through extremism, and intolerance. In an attempt to bring Russia closer to the European civilisation, Peter started to forget about the identity of the country, about its Eurasian roots. He believed that the reason why Russia fell behind was because of its Asian roots. When converging to Europe, Peter often considered only external forms of progressive ideas, ignoring the internal essence of centuries-old traditions. When making the reforms, Peter tried to make an ideal state, that is the one based on just and rational laws, but it didn't turn out that way. In practice, a police state was established, without any social control institutions. Taking the inspiration from the western advanced technology, science and military, Peter did not notice the ideas of humanism.
