= Swatter =

Swatter may refer to:

- 9M17 Fleyta, a Soviet anti-tank missile
- Fire flapper, a fire suppression device
- Flyswatter, a handheld fly-killing device
- Someone who participates in swatting
