= Fire iron =

Metal instrument for tending a fire

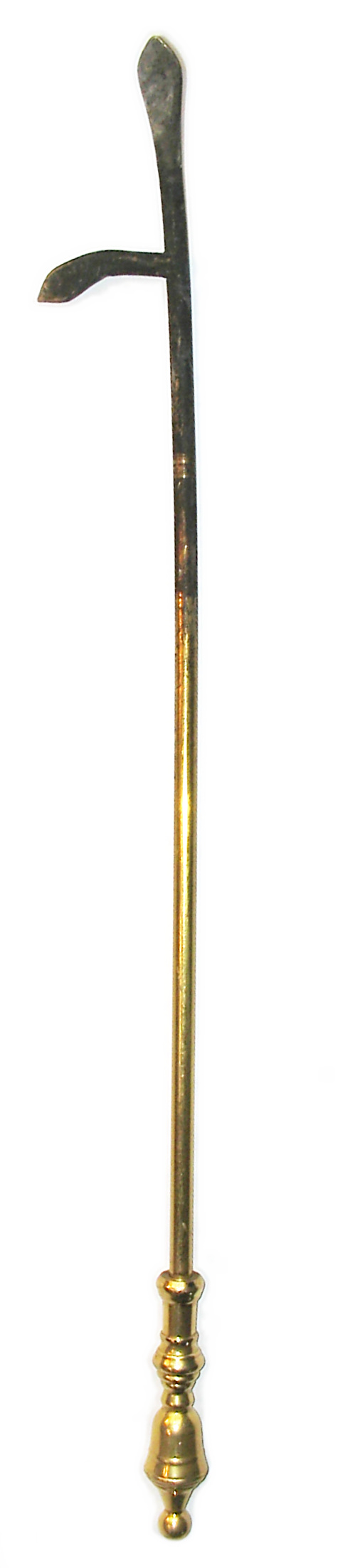
A brass fireplace poker.

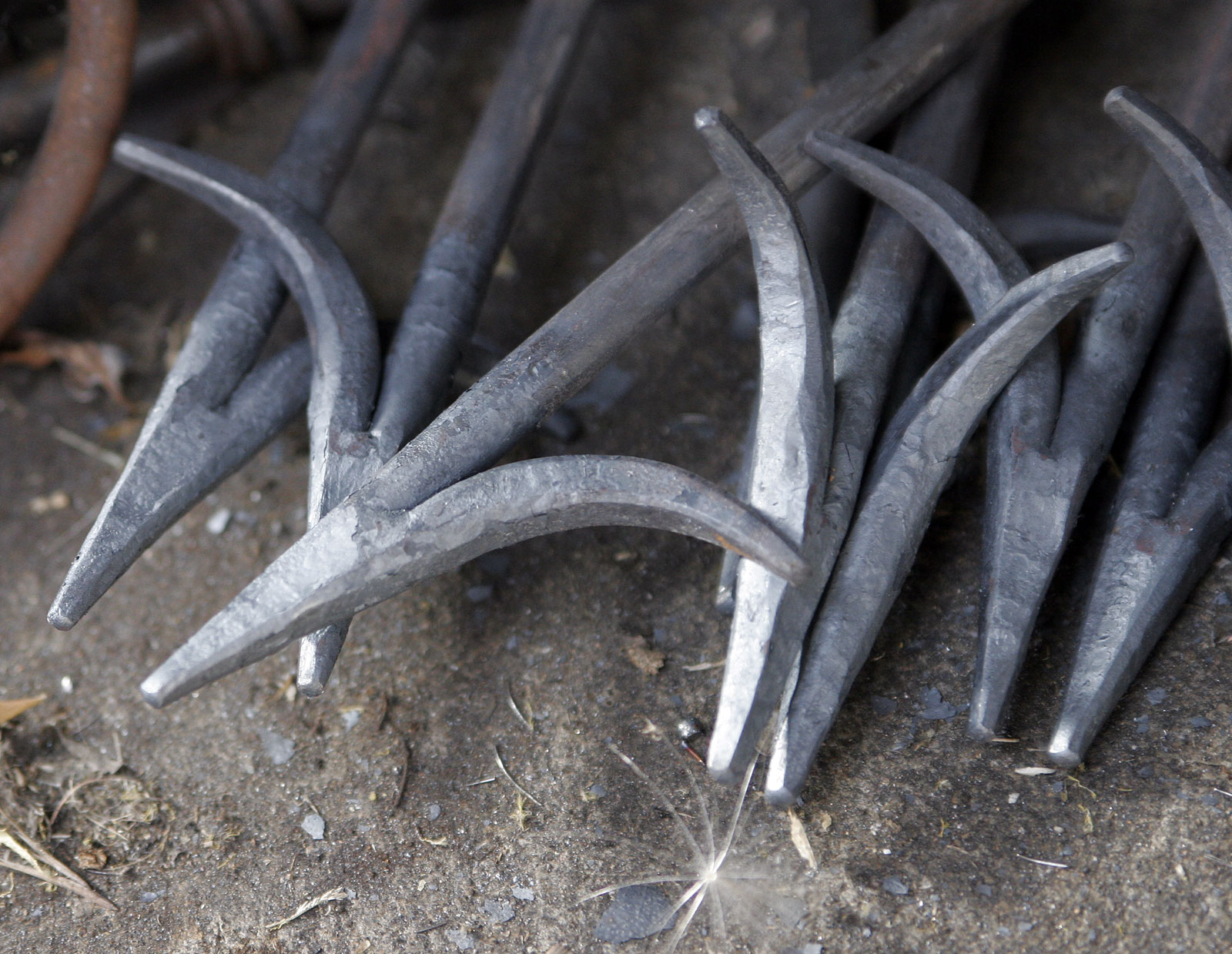
Freshly forged iron fireplace pokers.

A fire iron is any metal instrument for tending a fire.

== Types ==
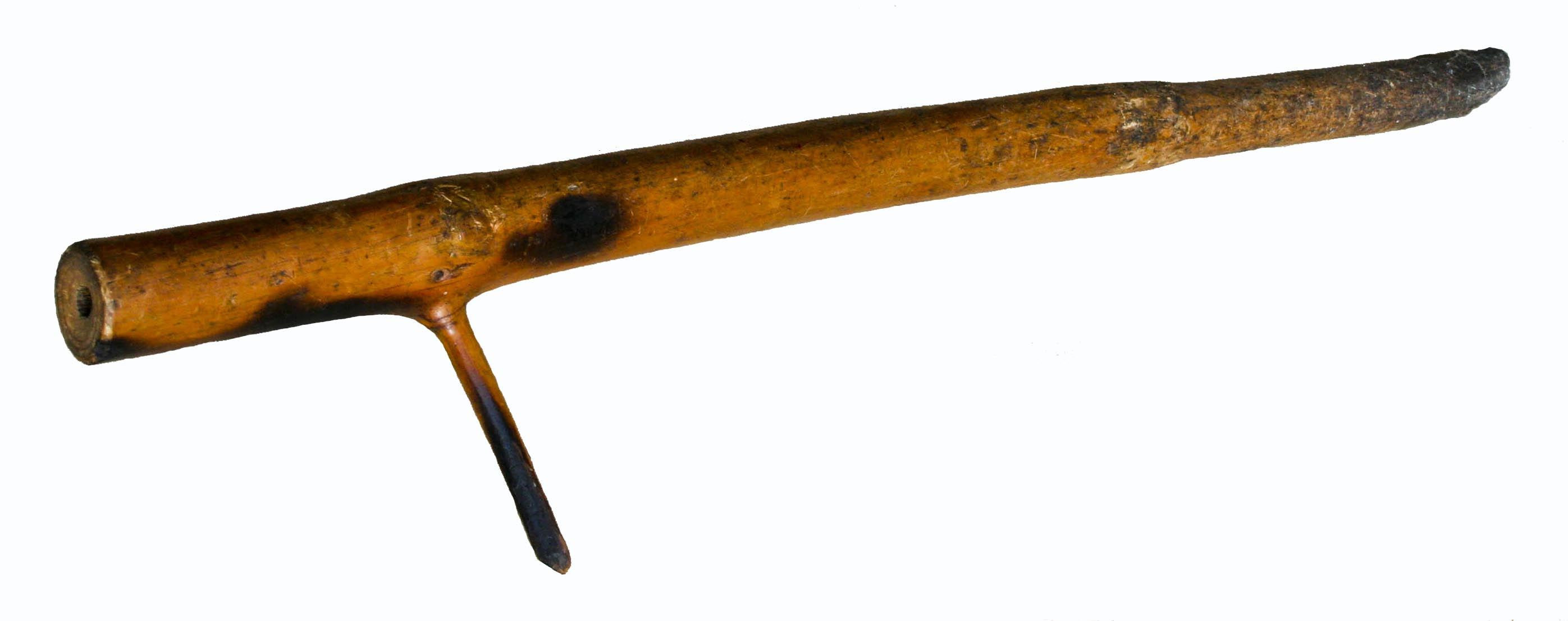
Bouffadou

There are three types of tools commonly used to tend a small fire, such as an indoor fireplace fire or yule log: the spade, the tongs and the poker itself. These tools make it possible to handle a fire without risk of burns or blisters.

A fireplace poker (also known as a fire iron or fire poker) is a short, rigid rod made of fireproof material used to adjust coal and wood fuel burning in a fireplace, and can be used to stir up a fire. A fireplace poker is usually metal and has a point at one end for pushing burning materials (or a hook for pulling/raking, or a combination) and a handle at the opposite end, sometimes with an insulated grip. Iron is the most popular metal from which the pokers are wrought. Brass is a more expensive alternative for a home poker set.

A slice bar has a flatter tip and can be used to stir up the fire or to clear the grates of ashes. Other fire irons include the fire rake (not to be confused with the firefighter's tool), fire tongs and fire shovel.

Many fireplace sets also include a small broom for sweeping up ash.

=== Japan ===
In Japan, traditional fire-tending device for a Japanese brazier (hibachi) is a pair of long metal chopsticks, called hibashi (火箸; fire chopsticks), used to pick up and manipulate the charcoal.

== Steam locomotives ==
As a steam locomotive runs, by-products are produced by the coal fire such as ash and clinker. If these waste products are allowed to build up in the fire, there would be an adverse effect on the performance of the locomotive. A fireman will employ various fire irons in order to clean the fire, whilst the locomotive stands. Below is a list of different types of fire iron that would typically be carried aboard a locomotive during operation. Note: not all the fire irons listed would be carried at once, only the ones needed:

- dart: The dart is a long straight fire iron that is used to break up coal that has caked together or to search for clinker
- curved iron: The curved iron is a fire iron that is curved at the end. It is used to manipulate the fire so as to remove ash and clinker. This can be accomplished by either moving the good fire to one side so ash and clinker may be accessed or it may be used to knock ash through the ash pan without disturbing the fire.
- t-iron: The t-iron has the same function as the curved iron, the main difference being it has a curved stem allowing the fireman to clean underneath the fire door.
- clinker shovel: The clinker shovel is employed to remove clinker or other waste products that are too large to fit through the gaps in the firebars. It may also be employed to remove cold waste products before lighting a new fire.
- ashpan rake: The ashpan rake has a metal piece attached to the end of a rod and is used to withdraw ash from the ashpan to prevent it from becoming clogged.
