= Controlled burn =

Technique to reduce potential fuel for wildfire through managed burning

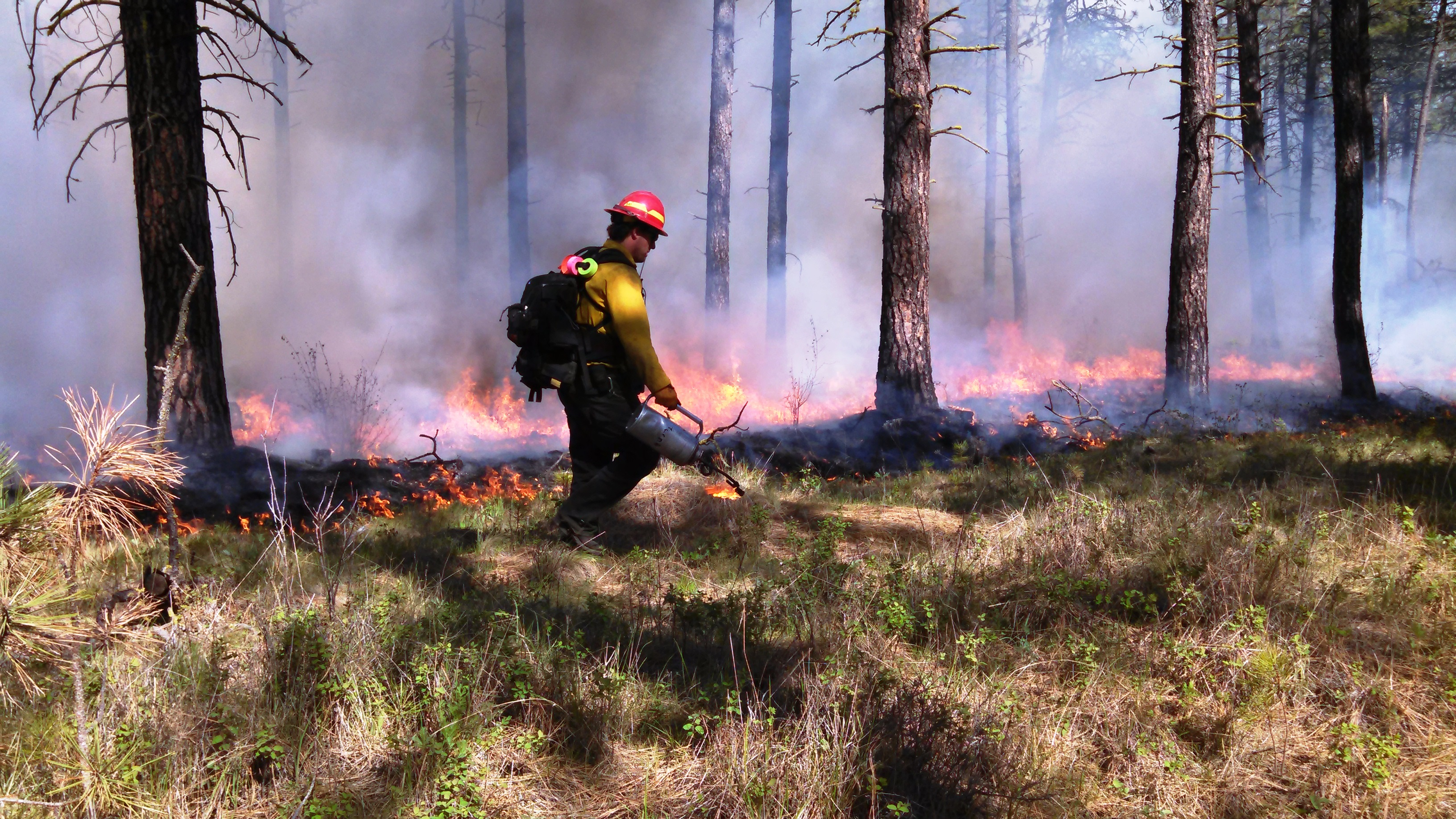
Prescribed fire in ponderosa pine forest in eastern Washington, United States, to restore ecosystem health

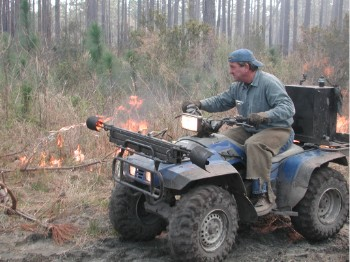
Firing the woods in a South Carolina forest with a custom made driptorch mounted on an ATV. The device spits flaming fuel oil from the side, instantly igniting the leaf litter.

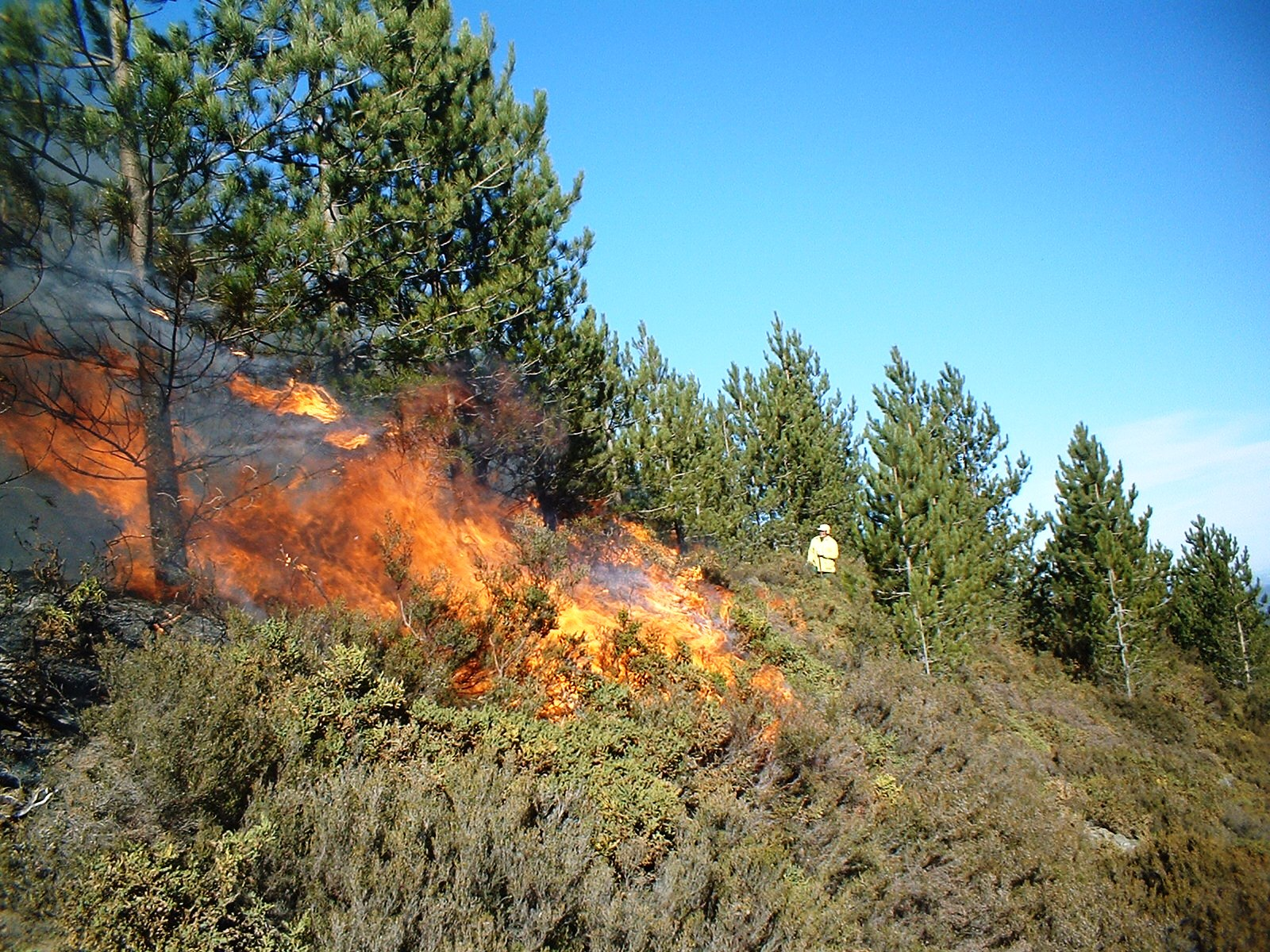
A prescribed burn in a Pinus nigra stand in Portugal

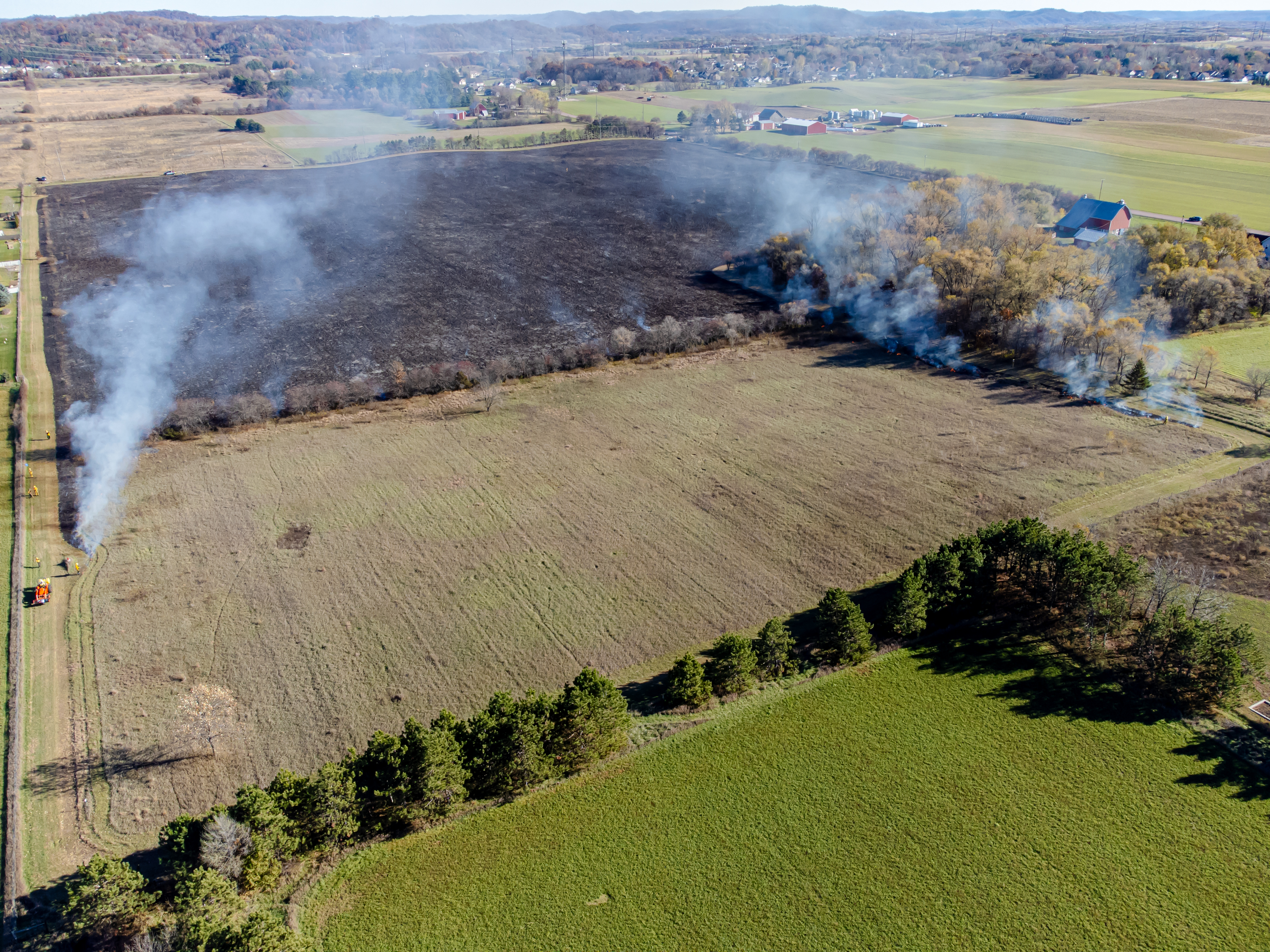
Near Holmen, Wisconsin

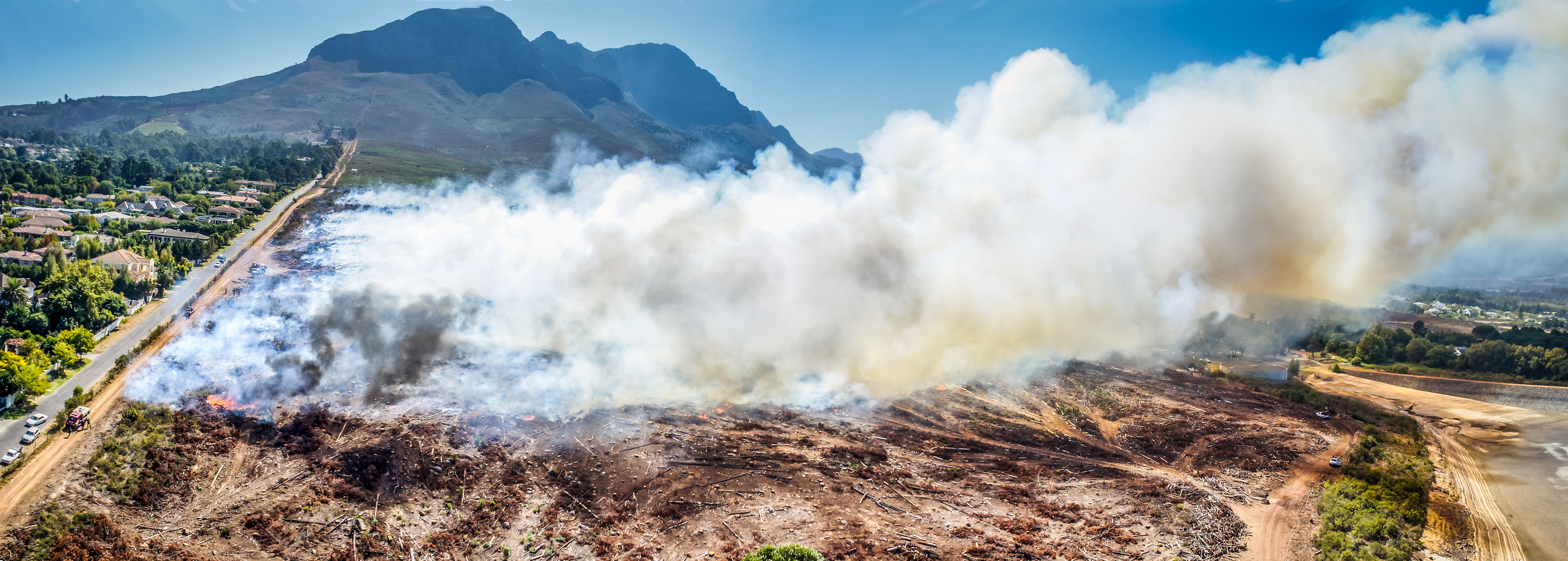
An aerial view of a controlled burn in Helderberg Nature Reserve in South Africa bordering the city of Cape Town. In South Africa controlled burns are important for maintaining the ecological health of indigenous fynbos as well as reducing the intensity of future burns.

A controlled burn (or prescribed burn) is the practice of intentionally setting a fire to remove buildup of vegetation and decaying organic material in a landscape. It is used for a variety of purposes, such as forest management, ecological restoration, land clearing or wildfire fuel management. Controlled burning can also be referred to as hazard reduction burning, backfiring, swailing or a burn-off.

Controlled burns are usually performed during cooler months to decrease the risk of more dangerous fires by removing build up of fuel. They play a role in ecology, such as stimulating the germination of some trees and revealing soil mineral layers to increase seedling vitality. In grassland, controlled burns shift the species present to mainly native grassland species, removing invasive species.

Controlled burning is also a large part of cultural burning practices, having been used for millennia by indigenous people across the world. Colonial legislation in North America and Australia displaced indigenous natives and prevented the traditional use of cultural burns, but this was reversed in the 20th century, with indigenous burning practices being more incorporated into land management.

== Uses ==
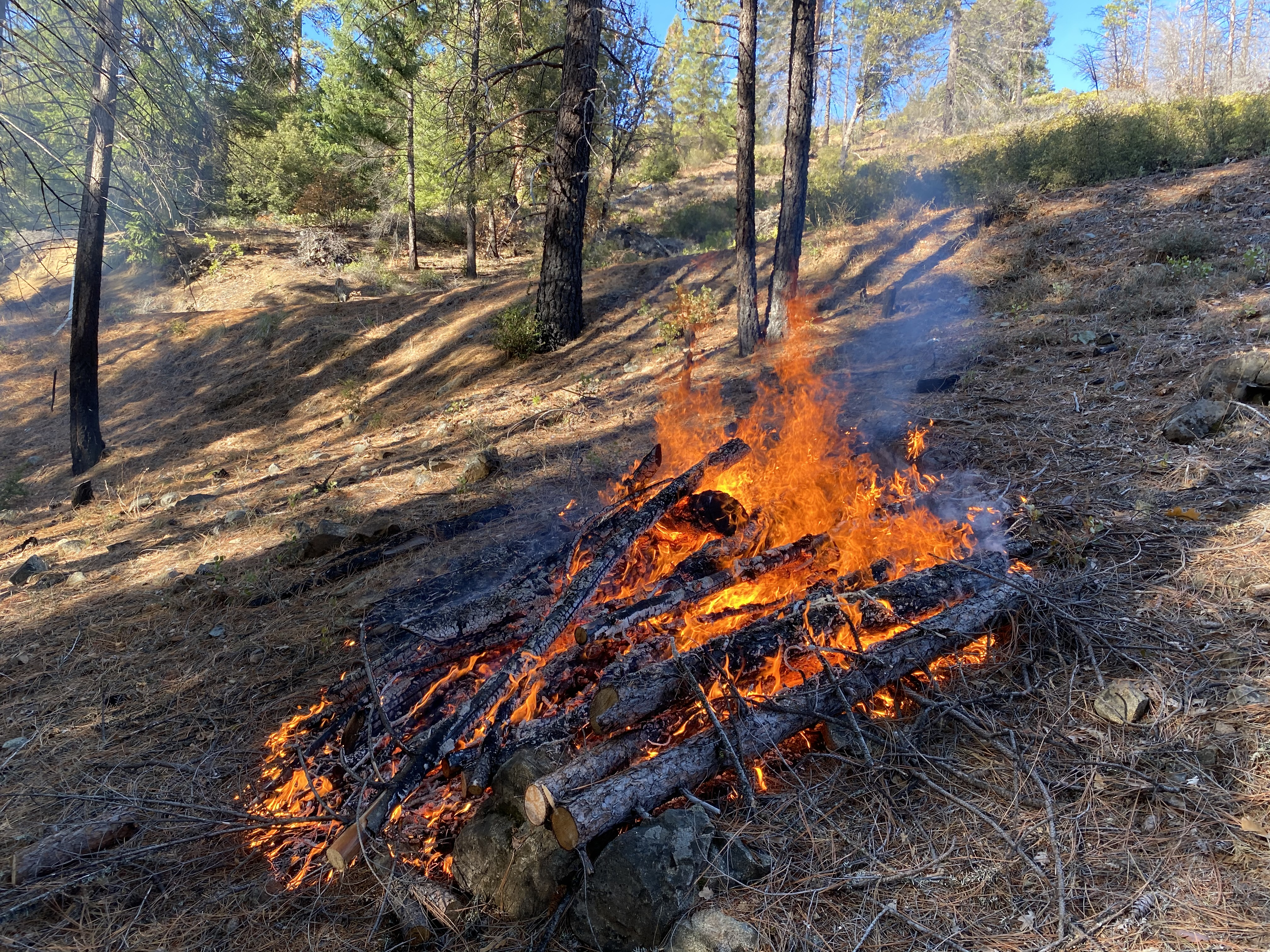
Pile burn

=== Forestry ===
Controlled burning reduces fuels, improves wildlife habitat, controls competing vegetation, helps control tree disease and pests, and perpetuates fire-dependent species. To improve the application of prescribed burns for conservation goals, which may involve mimicking historical or natural fire regimes, scientists assess the impact of variation in fire attributes. Parameters measured are fire frequency, intensity, severity, patchiness, spatial scale and phenology.

Furthermore, controlled fire can be used for site preparation when mechanized treatments are not possible because of terrain that prevents equipment access. Species variation and competition can drastically increase a few years after fuel treatments because of the increase in soil nutrients and availability of space and sunlight.

Many trees depend on fire as a way to clear out other plant species and release their seeds. The giant sequoia, among other fire-adapted conifer species, depends on fire to reproduce. The cones are pyriscent so they will only open after exposure to a certain temperature. This reduces competition for the giant sequoia seedlings because the fire has cleared non-fire-adapted, competing species. Pyriscent species benefit from moderate-intensity fires in older stands; however, climate change is causing more frequent high intensity fires in North America. Controlled burns can manage the fire cycle and the intensity of regenerate fires in forests with pyriscent species like the boreal forest in Canada.

Eucalyptus regnans or mountain ash of Australia also shows a unique evolution with fire, quickly replacing damaged buds or stems in the case of danger. They also carry their seeds in capsules which can be deposited at any time of the year. During a wildfire, the capsules drop nearly all of their seeds and the fire consumes the eucalypt adults, but most of the seeds survive using the ash as a source of nutrients. At their rate of growth, they quickly dominate the land and a new, like-aged eucalyptus forest grows. Other tree species like poplar can easily regenerate after a fire into a like-aged stand from a vast root system that is protected from fires because it is underground.

=== Grassland restoration ===
Native grassland species in North America and Australia are adapted to survive occasional low intensity fires. Controlled burns in prairie ecosystems mimic low intensity fires that shift the composition of plants from non-native species to native species. These controlled burns occur during the early spring before native plants begin actively growing, when soil moisture is higher and when the fuel load on the ground is low to ensure that the controlled burn remains low intensity.

=== Wildfire management ===
Controlled burns reduce the amount of understory fuel so when a wildfire enters the area, a controlled burn site can reduce the intensity of the fire or prevent the fire from crossing the area entirely. A controlled burn prior to the wildfire season can protect infrastructure and communities or mitigate risks associated with many dead standing trees such as after a pest infestation when forest fuels are high.

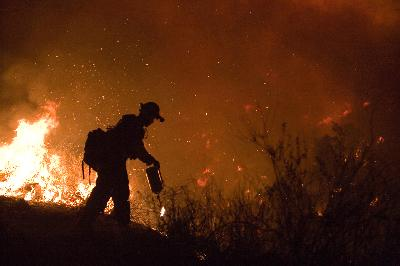
Northern California fire crews start a backfire to stop the Poomacha fire from advancing westward.

=== Agriculture ===
In the developing world, the use of controlled burns in agriculture is often referred to as slash and burn. In industrialized nations, it is seen as one component of shifting cultivation, as a part of field preparation for planting. Often called field burning, this technique is used to clear the land of any existing crop residue as well as kill weeds and weed seeds. Field burning is less expensive than most other methods such as herbicides or tillage, but because it produces smoke and other fire-related pollutants, its use is not popular in agricultural areas bounded by residential housing.

Prescribed fires are broadly used in the context of woody plant encroachment, with the aim of improving the balance of woody plants and grasses in shrublands and grasslands.

In Northern-India, especially in Punjab, Haryana, and Uttar Pradesh, unregulated burning of agricultural waste is a major problem. Smoke from these fires leads to degradation in environmental quality in these states and the surrounded area.

In East Africa, bird densities increased months after controlled burning had occurred.

=== Greenhouse gas abatement ===
Controlled burns on Australian savannas can result in a long-term cumulative reduction in greenhouse gas emissions. One working example is the West Arnhem Fire Management Agreement, started to bring "strategic fire management across 28,000 square kilometres (11,000 sq mi) of Western Arnhem Land" to partially offset greenhouse gas emissions from a liquefied natural gas plant in Darwin, Australia. Deliberately starting controlled burns early in the dry season results in a mosaic of burnt and unburnt country which reduces the area of stronger, late dry season fires; it is also known as "patch burning".

== Procedure ==
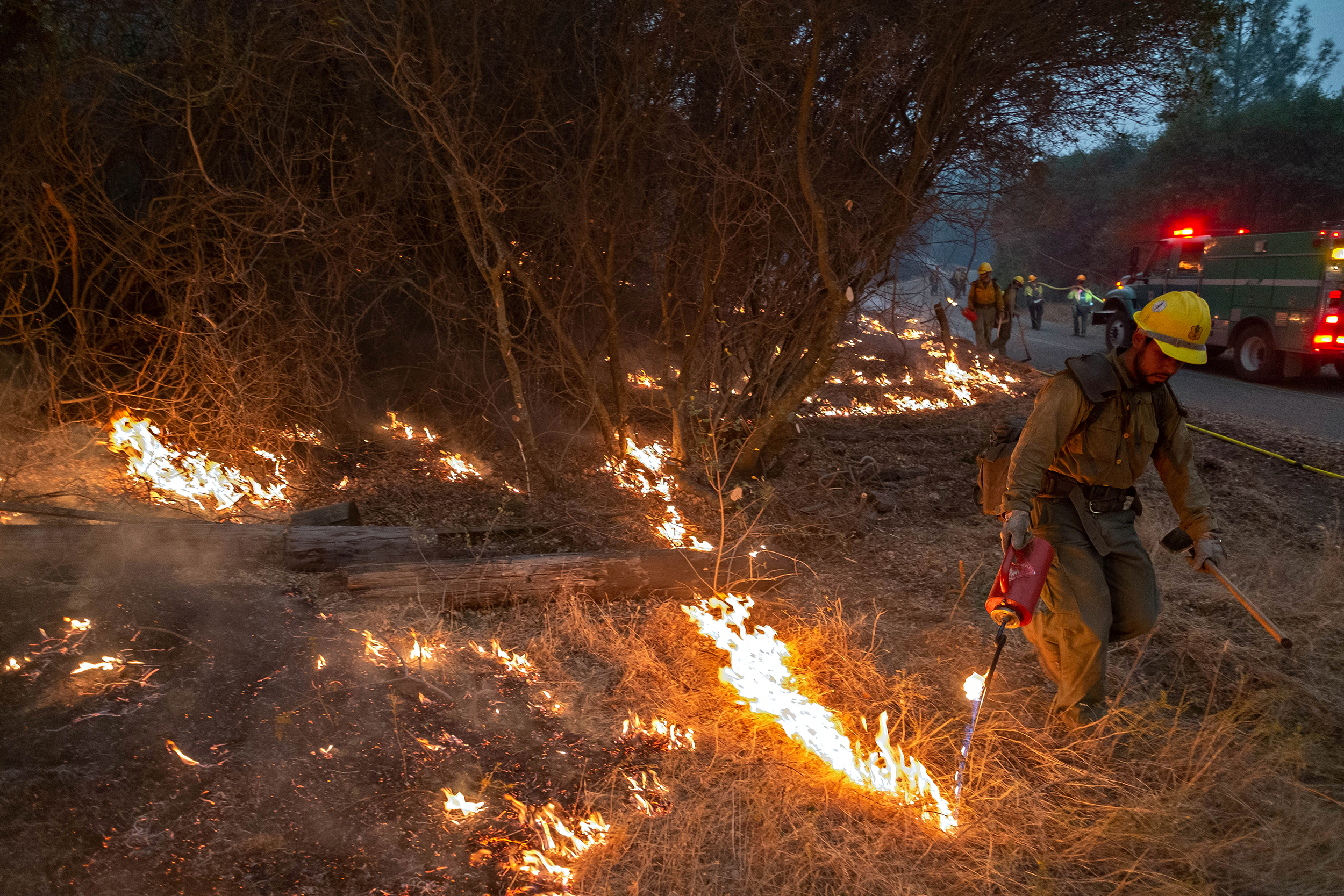
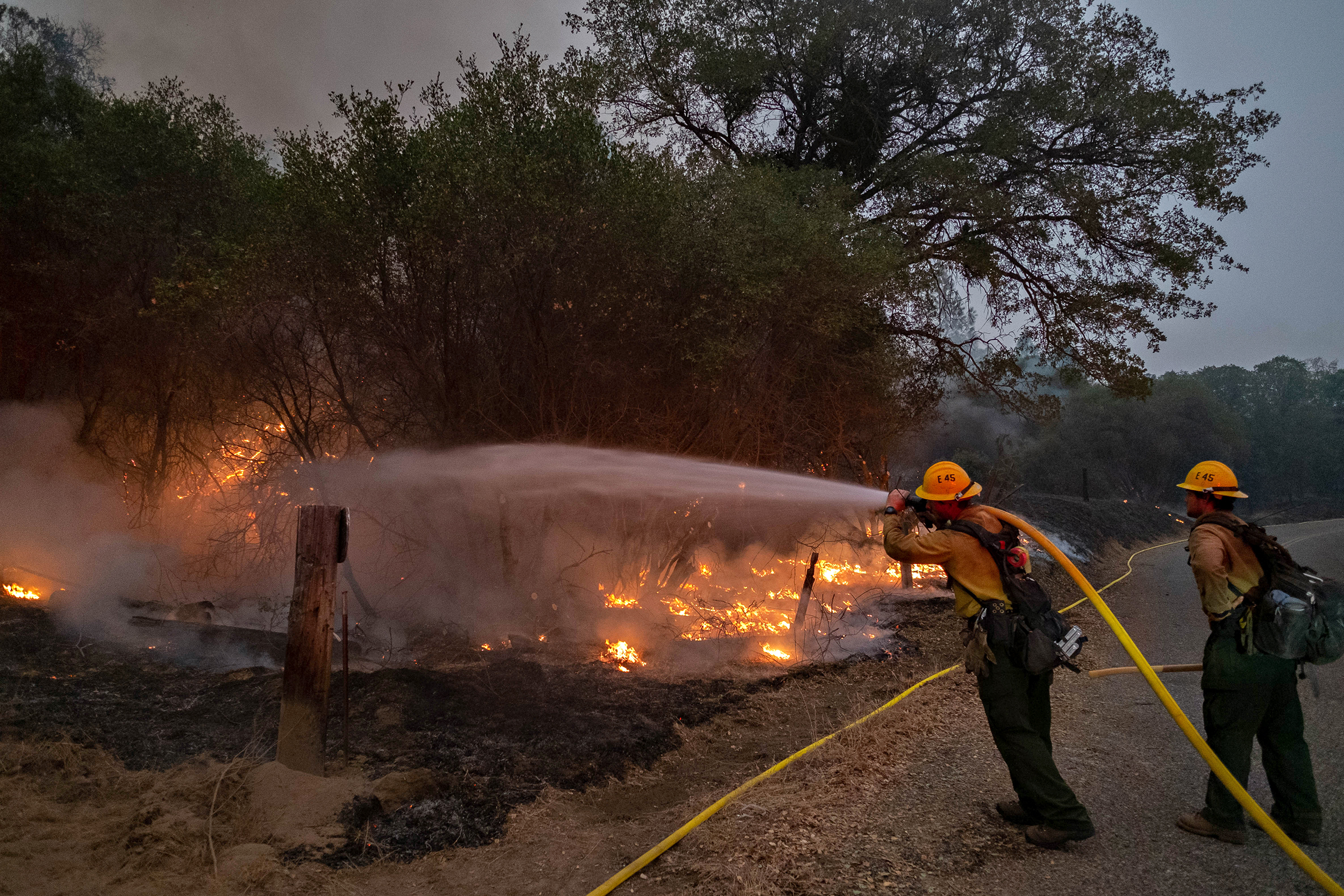
Firefighters light, then extinguish a controlled burn in response to the 2020 Creek Fire in California.

Health and safety, protecting personnel, preventing the fire from escaping and reducing the impact of smoke are the most important considerations when planning a controlled burn. While the most common driver of fuel treatment is the prevention of loss of human life and structures, certain parameters can also be changed to promote biodiversity and to rearrange the age of a stand or the assemblage of species.

To minimize the impact of smoke, burning should be restricted to daylight hours whenever possible. Furthermore, in temperate climates, it is important to burn grasslands and prairies before native species begin growing for the season so that only non-native species, which send up shoots earlier in the spring, are affected by the fire.

=== Ground ignition ===
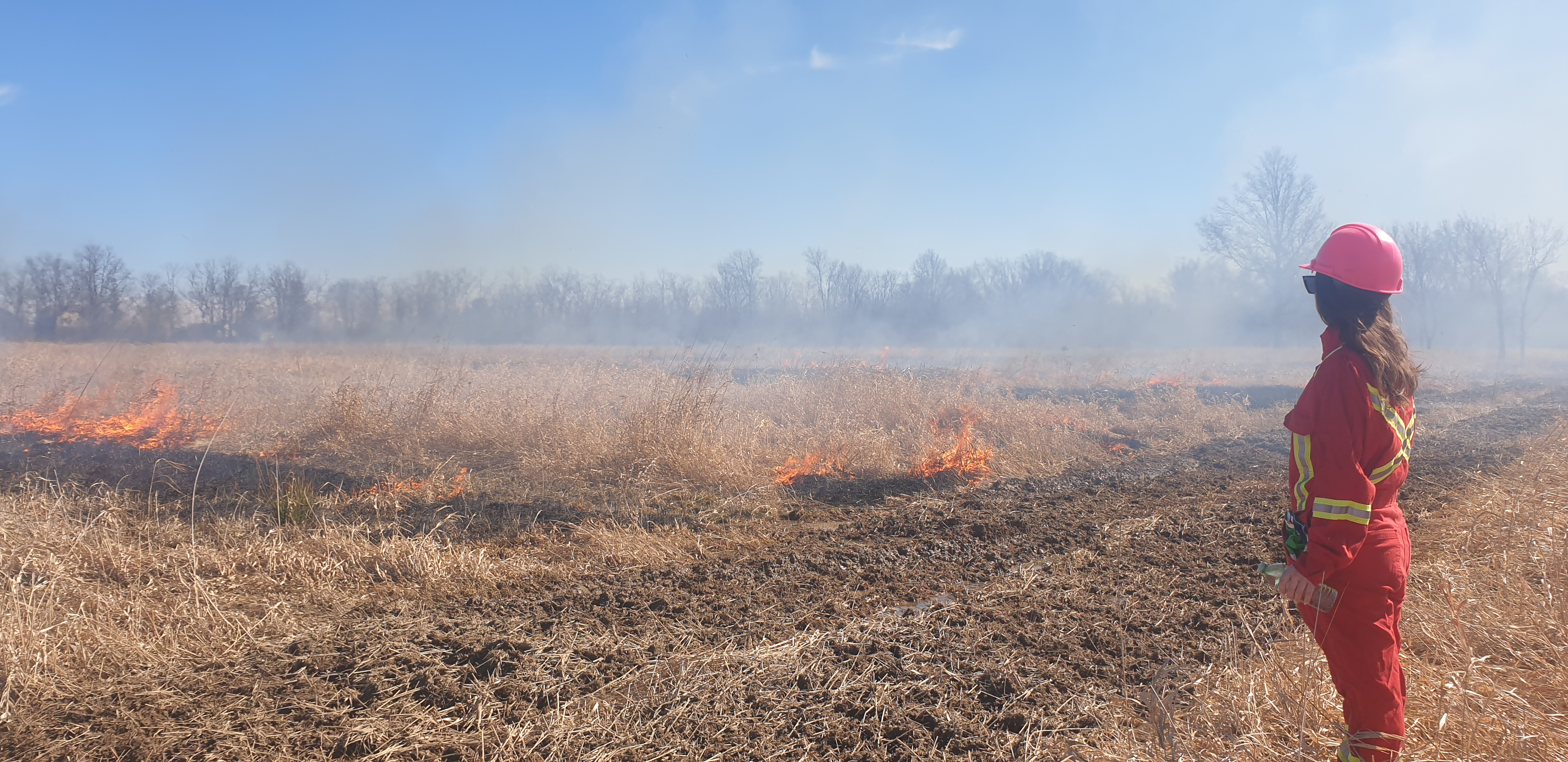
A controlled burn in Niagara Falls, Ontario where the Burn Boss is watching a back fire (lit first and in the background) move towards a head fire (in the foreground)

Back burning or a back fire is the term given to the process of lighting vegetation in such a way that it has to burn against the prevailing wind. This produces a slower moving and more controllable fire. Controlled burns utilize back burning during planned fire events to create a "black line" where fire cannot burn through. Back burning or backfiring is also done to stop a wildfire that is already in progress. Firebreaks are also used as an anchor point to start a line of fires along natural or man-made features such as a river, road or a bulldozed clearing.

Head fires, that burn with the prevailing wind, are used between two firebreaks because head fires will burn more intensely and move faster than a back burn. Head fires are used when a back burn would move too slowly through the fuel either because the fuel moisture is high or the wind speed is low. Another method to increase the speed of a back burn is to use a flank fire which is lit at right angles to the prevailing wind and spreads in the same direction.

==== Grassland or prairie burning ====
In Ontario, Canada, controlled burns are regulated by the Ministry of Natural Resources and only trained personnel can plan and ignite controlled burns within Ontario's fire regions or if the Ministry of Natural Resources in involved in any aspect of planning a controlled burn. The team performing the prescribed burn is divided into several roles; the Burn Boss, Communications, Suppression and Ignition. The planning process begins by submitting an application to a local fire management office and after approval, applicants must submit a burn plan several weeks prior to ignition.

On the day of the controlled burn, personnel meet with the Burn Boss and discuss the tactics being used for ignition and suppression, health and safety precautions, fuel moisture levels and the weather (wind direction, wind speed, temperature and precipitation) for the day. On site, local fire control authorities are notified by telephone about the controlled burn while the rest of the team members fill drip torches with pre-mixed fuel, fill suppression packs with water and put up barricades and signage to prevent pedestrian access to the controlled burn. Driptorches are canisters filled with fuel and a wick at the end that is used to ignite the lines of fire. Safe zones are established to ensure personnel know where the fire cannot cross either because of natural barriers like bodies of water or human-made barriers like tilled earth.

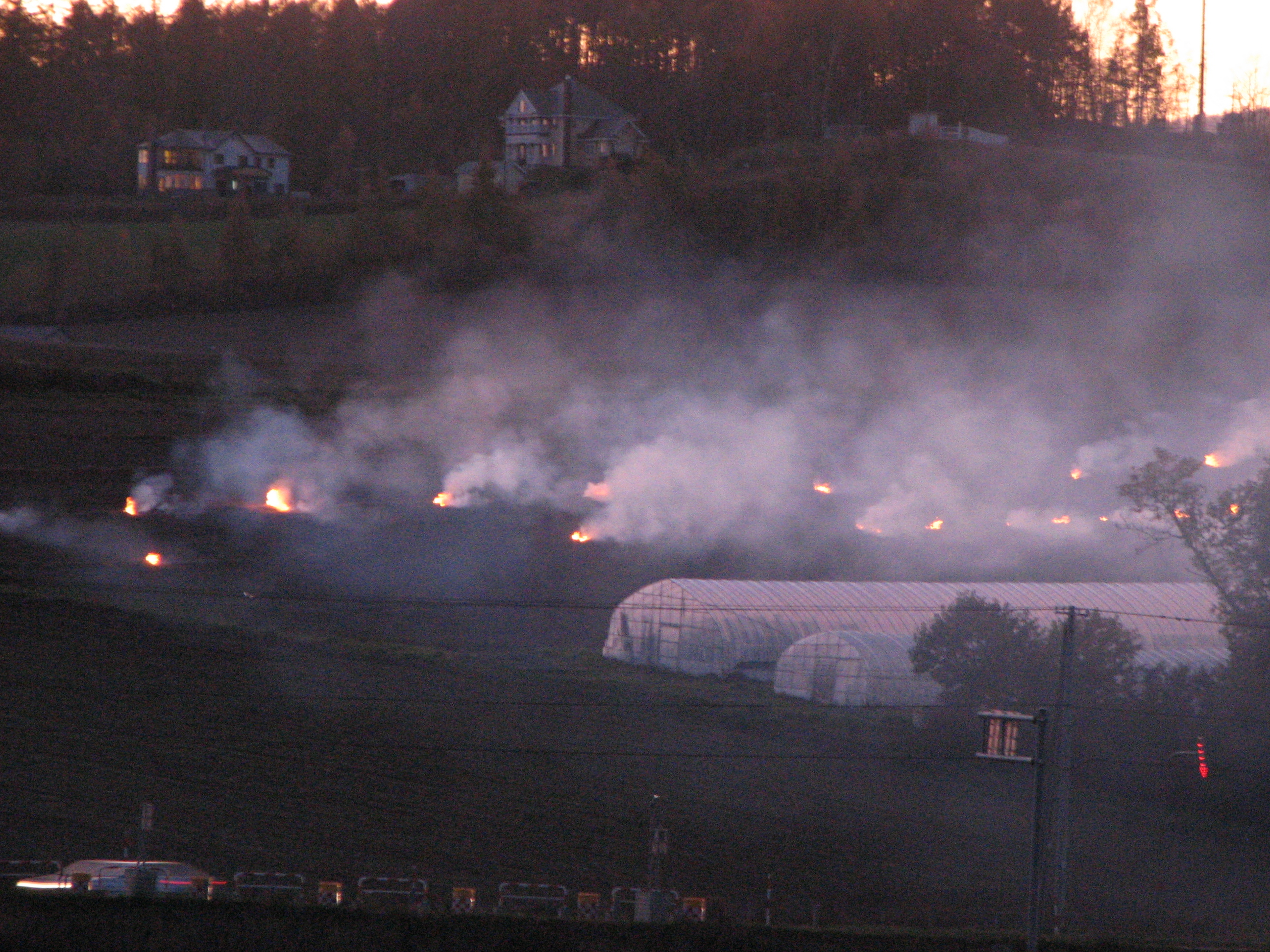
Controlled burn in Hokkaido, Japan

During ignition, the Burn Boss relays information about the fire (flame length, flame height, the percent of ground that has been blackened) to the Communications Officer who documents this information. The Communications Officer relays information about the wind speed and wind direction so the Burn Boss can determine how the direction of both flames and smoke and plan their lines of fire accordingly. Once the ignition phase has ended in a section, the suppression team "mops up" by using suppression packs to suppress smoldering material. Other tools used for suppression are RTVs equipped with a water tank and a pump and hose that is installed in a nearby body of water. Finally, once the mop up has finished, the Burn Boss declares the controlled burn over and local fire authorities are notified.

==== Slash pile burning ====
There are several different methods used to burn piles of slash from forestry operations. Broadcast burning is the burning of scattered slash over a wide area. Pile burning is gathering up the slash into piles before burning. These burning piles may be referred to as bonfires. High temperatures can harm the soil, damaging it physically, chemically or sterilizing it. Broadcast burns tend to have lower temperatures and will not harm the soil as much as pile burning, though steps can be taken to treat the soil after a burn. In lop and scatter burning, slash is left to compact over time, or is compacted with machinery. This produces a lower intensity fire, as long as the slash is not packed too tightly.

The risk of fatal fires that stem from burning slash can also be reduced by proactively reducing ground fuels before they can create a fuel ladder and begin an active crown fire. Predictions show thinned forests lead to a reduction in fire intensity and flame lengths of forest fires compared to untouched or fire-proofed areas.

=== Aerial ignition ===
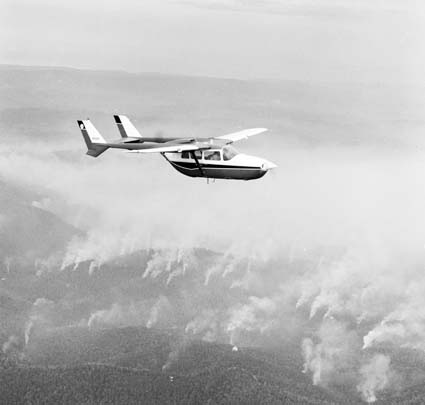
Airplane in Western Australia performing aerial ignition

Aerial ignition is a type of controlled burn where incendiary devices are released from aircraft.

== History ==
There are two basic causes of wildfires. One is natural, mainly through lightning, and the other is human activity. Controlled burns have a long history in wildland management. Fire has been used by humans to clear land since the Neolithic period. Fire history studies have documented regular wildland fires ignited by indigenous peoples in North America and Australia prior to the establishment of colonial law and fire suppression. Native Americans frequently used fire to manage natural environments in a way that benefited humans and wildlife in forests and grasslands by starting low-intensity fires that released nutrients for plants, reduced competition for cultivated species, and consumed excess flammable material that otherwise would eventually fuel high-intensity, catastrophic fires.

=== North America ===
The use of controlled burns in North America ended in the early 20th century, when federal fire policies were enacted with the goal of suppressing all fires. Since 1995, the US Forest Service has slowly incorporated burning practices into its forest management policies.

Fire suppression has changed the composition and ecology of North American habitats, including highly fire-dependent ecosystems such as oak savannas and canebrakes, which are now critically endangered habitats on the brink of extinction. In the Eastern United States, fire-sensitive trees such as the red maple are increasing in number, at the expense of fire-tolerant species like oaks.

==== Canada ====
In the Anishinaabeg Nation around the Great Lakes, fire is a living being that has the power to change landscapes through both destruction and the regrowth and return of life following a fire. Human beings are also inexorably tied to the land they live on as stewards who maintain the ecosystems around them. Because fire can reveal dormant seedlings, it is a land management tool. Fire was a part of the landscapes of Ontario until early colonial rule restricted indigenous culture in and across Canada. During colonization, large scale forest fires were caused by sparks from railroads and fire was used to clear land for agriculture use. The public perception of forest fires was positive because the cleared land represented taming the wilderness to an urban populace. The conservation movement, which was spearheaded by Edmund Zavitz in Ontario, caused a ban on all fires, both natural wild fires and intentional fires.

In the 1970s, Parks Canada began implementing small prescribed burns. However, the scale of wildfires each year outpaces the acreage of land that is intentionally burnt. In the late 1980s, the Ministry of Natural Resources in Ontario began conducting prescribed burns on forested land which led to the creation of a prescribed burn program as well as training and regulation for controlled burns in Ontario.

In British Columbia, there was an increase in the intensity and scale of wildfires after local bylaws restricted the use of controlled burns. In 2017, following one of the worst years for wildfire in the province's history, indigenous leadership and public service members wrote an independent report that suggested returning to the traditional use of prescribed burns to manage understory fuel from wildfires. The government of British Columbia responded by committing to using controlled burns as a wildfire management tool.

==== United States ====
The Oregon Department of Environmental Quality began requiring a permit for farmers to burn their fields in 1981, but the requirements became stricter in 1988 following a multi-car collision in which smoke from field burning near Albany, Oregon, obscured the vision of drivers on Interstate 5, leading to a 23-car collision in which 7 people died and 37 were injured. This resulted in more scrutiny of field burning and proposals to ban field burning in the state altogether.

With controlled burns, there is also a risk that the fires get out of control. For example, the Calf Canyon/Hermits Peak Fire, the largest wildfire in the history of New Mexico, was started by two distinct instances of controlled burns, which had both been set by the US Forest Service, getting out of control and merging.

The conflict of controlled burn policy in the United States has roots in historical campaigns to combat wildfires and to the eventual acceptance of fire as a necessary ecological phenomenon. Following colonization of North America, the US used fire suppression laws to eradicate the indigenous practice of prescribed fire. This was done against scientific evidence that supported prescribed burns as a natural process. At the loss to the local environment, colonies utilized fire suppression in order to benefit the logging industry.

The notion of fire as a tool had somewhat evolved by the late 1970s as the National Park Service authorized and administered controlled burns. Following prescribed fire reintroduction, the Yellowstone fires of 1988 occurred, which significantly politicized fire management. The ensuing media coverage was a spectacle that was vulnerable to misinformation. Reports drastically inflated the scale of the fires which disposed politicians in Wyoming, Idaho, and Montana to believe that all fires represented a loss of revenue from tourism. Paramount to the new action plans is the suppression of fires that threaten the loss of human life with leniency toward areas of historic, scientific, or special ecological interest.

There is still a debate amongst policy makers about how to deal with wildfires. Senators Ron Wyden and Mike Crapo of Oregon and Idaho have been moving to reduce the shifting of capital from fire prevention to fire suppression following the harsh fires of 2017 in both states.

Tensions around fire prevention continue to rise due to the increasing prevalence of climate change. As drought conditions worsen, North America has been facing an abundance of destructive wildfires. Since 1988, many states have made progress toward controlled burns. In 2021, California increased the number of trained personnel to perform controlled burns and created more accessibility for landowners.

=== Europe ===
In the European Union, burning crop stubble after harvest is used by farmers for plant health reasons under several restrictions in cross-compliance regulations.

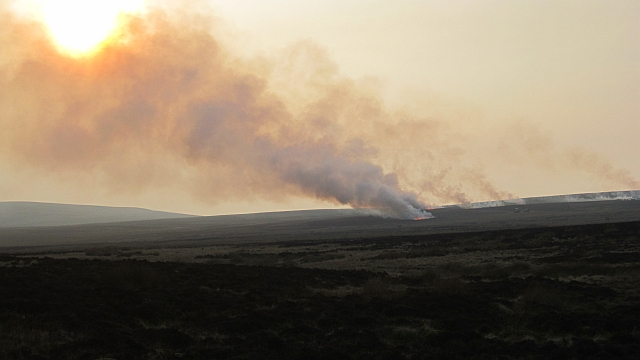
Muir burn in UK

In the north of Great Britain, large areas of grouse moors are managed by burning in a practice known as muirburn. This kills trees and grasses, preventing natural succession, and generates the mosaic of ling (heather) of different ages which allows very large populations of red grouse to be reared for shooting. The peat-lands are some of the largest carbon sinks in the UK, providing an immensely important ecological service. The government has restricted burning to the area but hunters have been continuing to set the moors ablaze, releasing a large amount of carbon into the atmosphere and destroying native habitat.

=== Africa ===
The Maasai ethnic group conduct traditional burning in savanna ecosystems before the rainy season to provide varied grazing land for livestock and to prevent larger fires when the grass is drier and the weather is hotter. In the past few decades, the practice of burning savanna has decreased because rain has become inadequate and unpredictable, there are more frequent occurrences of large accidental fires and Tanzanian government policies prevent burning savanna.

=== Australia ===
Indigenous Australians have an extensive history of traditional burning practices including cool burning or fire-stick farming. These practices were often suppressed during colonial rule, and the continuing struggle for land rights mean that Australian fire activity looks different today than before colonial intervention. However, the return of land rights to indigenous communities and changing governmental attitudes to indigenous practices have led to an increase in prescribed burning in Australia in recent history.

== See also ==
- Agroecology
- Fire ecology
- Wildfire suppression
