= Fire rake =

Wildland fire fighting tool

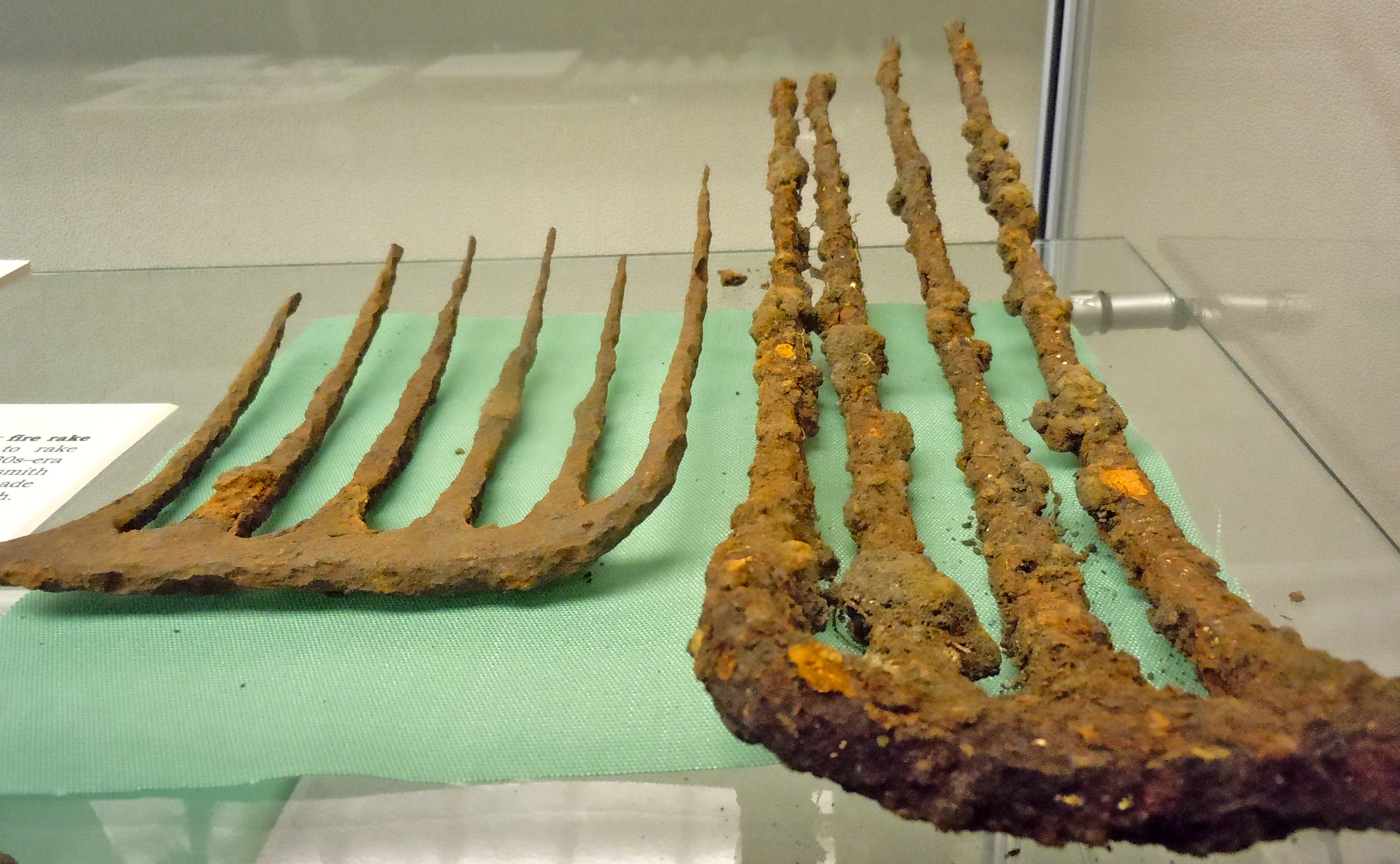
Fire rakes excavated from Duffy's Cut

A fire rake is a wildland fire fighting tool. A fire rake has a wooden or fiberglass handle with a rake head consisting of four to six sharp, serrated, triangular steel blades. It is used to rake a fire break with the sharp teeth, enabling it to reach fire in undergrowth in addition to loose surface debris. It is also used to break apart vegetation for access by other implements. A McLeod, which is sometimes called a rake hoe, is a similar tool whose rake portion looks more like a steel rake but with sharp edges on the teeth. The teeth of the more traditional fire rake which resemble the teeth of a great white shark allow it to penetrate deeper into the undergrowth when necessary. The preference for one implement over the other is somewhat subjective.

A fire fighter will rake burning material back into the (black) area already burned, moving the fire away from the fuel ahead of it to create a fire break. The burning material is left to burn itself out away from the edge of the fire line, or another fire fighter with a fire flapper will smother it if required. The tool will cut through any undergrowth that may be burning and overturn some soil, further assisting in creating a fire break, thus smothering fire. This can reduce the temperature of burning materials below their threshold of ignition.

Tractor-drawn fire rakes were developed in the 1950s to aid in the working of fire breaks.

== Designation ==
- In English-speaking countries, it is primarily referred to by the U.S. Forest Service standard name, ‘Tool, Rake and Cutting.’ In the southeastern United States, it is also called a ‘council rake’ because it was developed by Council Tool in collaboration with forestry authorities.
- In Korean, rakes used in the process of extinguishing wildfires are referred to as ‘fire rakes,’ ‘fire rakes,’ or ‘sickle rakes’ depending on the context, and in guidelines, they are labeled as ‘rakes’ and included in equipment for clearing fires.

== History ==
- In the 1920s, it was established as a hand tool for extinguishing wildfires in the southeastern United States, and Council Tool established a mass-production design in collaboration with the field.
- In 2000, the U.S. Forest Service established the 5100-284C standard, which includes material, heat treatment, finish, and labeling standards, and uses it as a standard for supplies.

== See also ==
- Pulaski (tool)
