= Haft =

Haft may refer to:

== People ==
- Al Haft (1886–1976), professional and amateur wrestler, wrestling and boxing promoter and wrestling trainer
- Harry Haft (1925–2007), Polish World War II concentration camp inmate forced to box other inmates, the losers being executed
- Herbert Haft (1920-2004), American businessman, father of Robert Haft
- Linal Haft (born 1945), English actor
- Robert Haft (20th century), American businessman
- Sam Haft (born 1990), American singer, songwriter, and voice actor
- Steven Haft (born 1949), American film producer, attorney, and media executive

== Other uses ==
- Haft, another name for the hilt of a weapon
- Haft, the shaft or handle of an arrow, axe, or spear
- The narrow constricted part of the standards (petals) and falls (sepals) of the iris flower
- Haft, Iran, a village in Razavi Khorasan Province

== See also ==
- Hafting, the process by which an arrowhead, axehead, or spearhead is set into the wood.
