= Pulaski (tool) =

Hand tool for firefighting

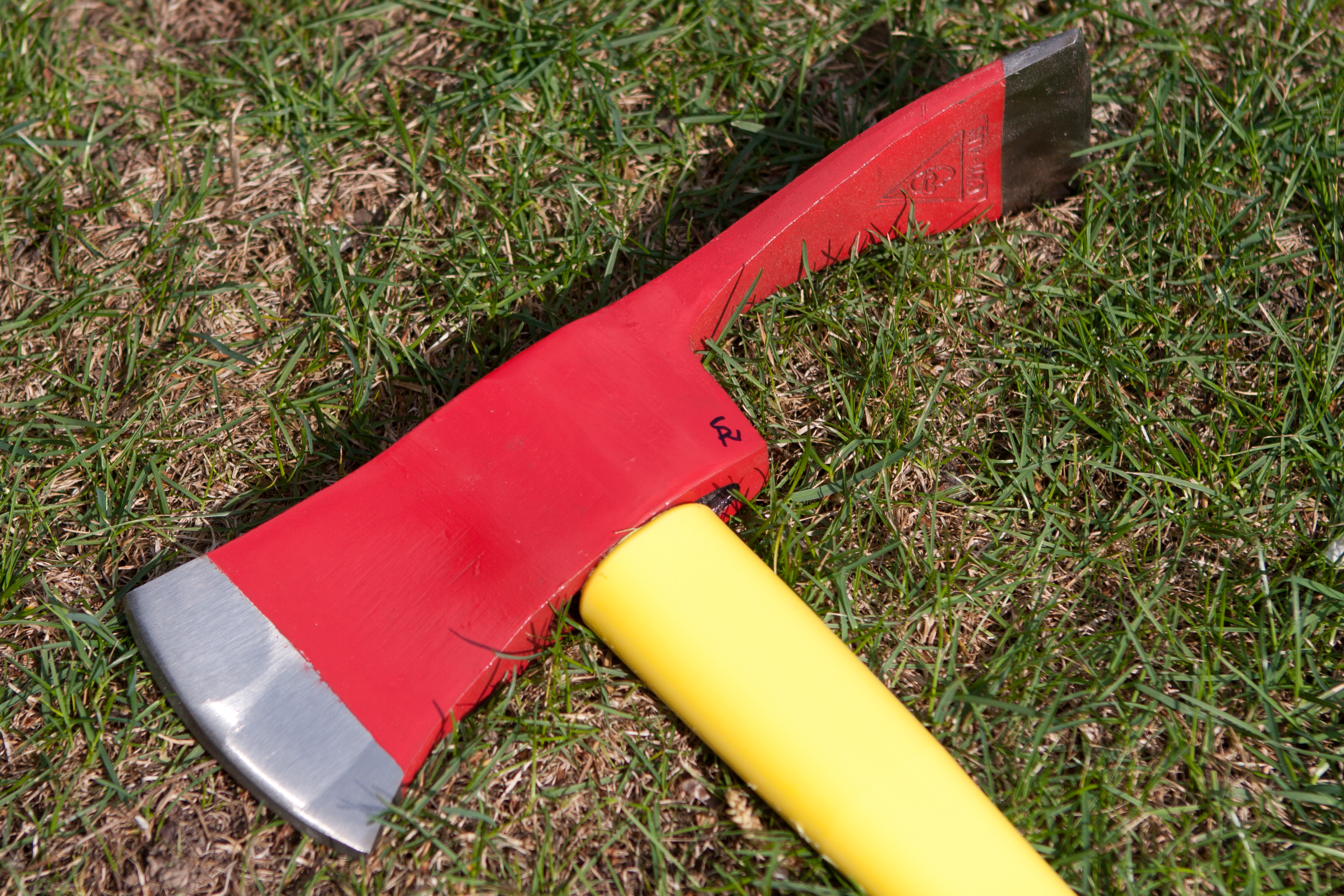
A Pulaski combines the functions of an axe and an adze in one tool.

The Pulaski—also known as the fire axe—is a specialty hand tool used in fighting fires, particularly wildfires, which combines an axe and an adze in one head. Similar to a cutter mattock, it has a rigid handle of wood, plastic, or fiberglass. The Pulaski was developed for constructing firebreaks, able to both dig soil and chop wood. It is also well adapted for trail construction, and can be used for gardening and other outdoor work for general excavation and digging holes in root-bound or hard soil.

== History ==
The invention of the Pulaski is credited to Ed Pulaski, an assistant ranger with the United States Forest Service in 1911. Similar tools were introduced in 1876 by the Collins Tool Company. A tool that serves the same purpose was used in the Alps for over 300 years for planting trees (Wiedehopfhaue) or the dolabra in ancient Rome. Pulaski was famous for taking action to save the lives of a crew of 45 firefighters during Idaho's Great Fire of 1910. His invention (or re-invention) of a combination axe and adze may have been a result of the disaster, as he saw the need for better firefighting tools. Pulaski further refined the tool by 1913, and it came into use in the Rocky Mountain region. In 1920 the Forest Service began contracting for the tool to be commercially manufactured but its use remained regional until the tool became a national standard in the 1930s.

A tool bearing the initials "E.P.", which purportedly belonged to Pulaski himself, is part of the collection of the Smithsonian Institution at the Wallace District Mining Museum in Wallace, Idaho.

== See also ==
- Driptorch
- Fire flapper
- Fire rake
- Flare
- Halligan bar
- McLeod (tool)
- Pickaroon
- Rake
