= Driptorch =

Tool for controlled burning

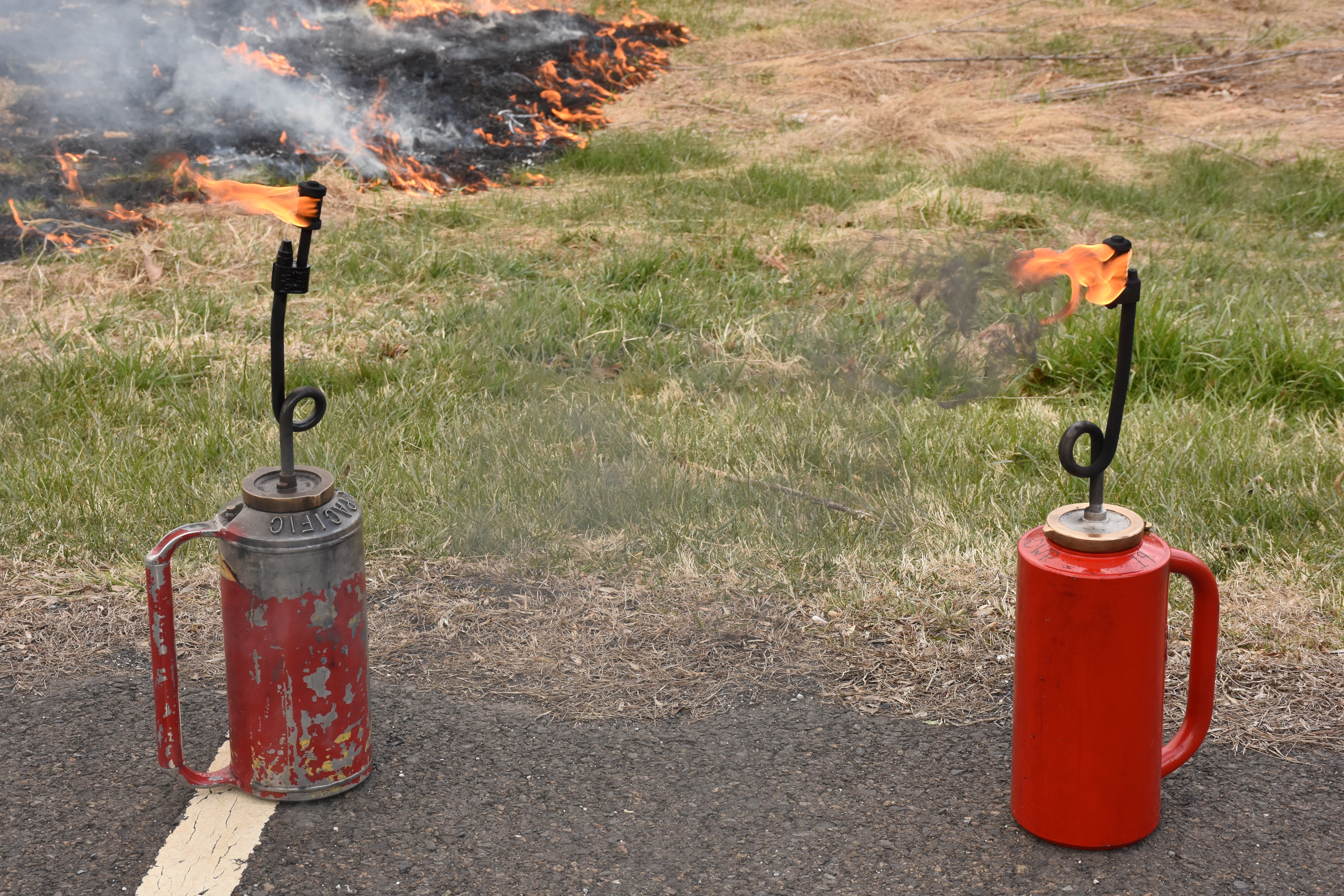
Two driptorches during a prescribed fire at Valley Forge National Historical Park.

A driptorch is a tool used in wildfire suppression, controlled burning, and other forestry applications to intentionally ignite fires by dripping flaming fuel.

== Description ==
The Drip Torch. 1. Wick 2. Spout 3. Fuel trap loop 4. Locking ring 5. Air breather valve 6. Handle 7. Storage configuration - assembly inverted, breather valve closed, tube cap in place.

The driptorch consists of a canister for holding fuel with a handle attached to the side, a spout with a loop to prevent fire from entering the fuel canister, a breather valve to allow air into the canister while fuel is exiting through the spout, and a wick from which flaming fuel is dropped to the ground. The wick is ignited and allows the fire to be directed as needed. The spout and wick can be secured upside down inside the canister for storage or transport. Typically the fuel used is a mixture of gasoline and diesel with a ratio of 30% to 70% respectively, although, the amounts may need to be adjusted according to fuel and weather conditions. Sometimes heavier oils are used to increase adhesion of the liquid fuel to the vegetation, and increase burn time and heat.

Variations of the driptorch can be attached to off-road vehicles, such as tractors, to ignite a fire while driving slowly along the ignition line. Another variant of the driptorch is the helitorch, which is attached to a helicopter and is used to ignite fire from the air.

== Usage ==
The intentional ignition of fires is a common firefighting tactic. A burnout (also called a firing operation, firing out or a back burn) is a smaller fire ignited along a control line ahead of the main fire. The intent is to consume fuel ahead of the main fire, strengthening the control line. A backfire is a more aggressive type of burning done to influence the behavior of the main fire.

In forest and prairie management, the driptorch is the most common tool used to ignite prescribed burns, which are used to remove excess fuel buildup or to re-create natural cycles of fire in an ecosystem. Other tools which can also be used for this purpose include the fusee, a pyrotechnic device similar to a road flare, other pyrotechnic devices, or even burning vegetative fuels.

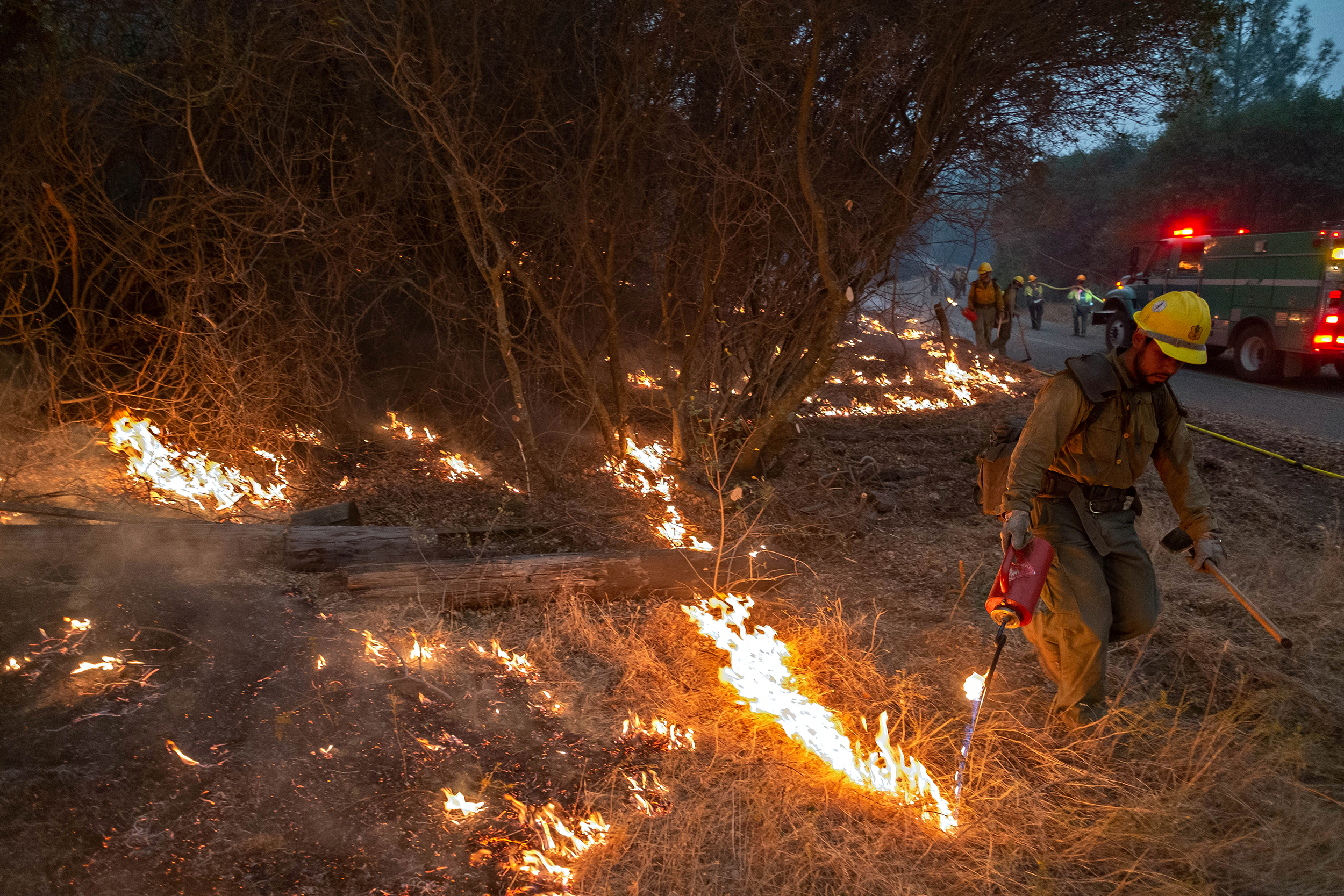
A driptorch used for a controlled burn in response to the 2020 Creek Fire in California

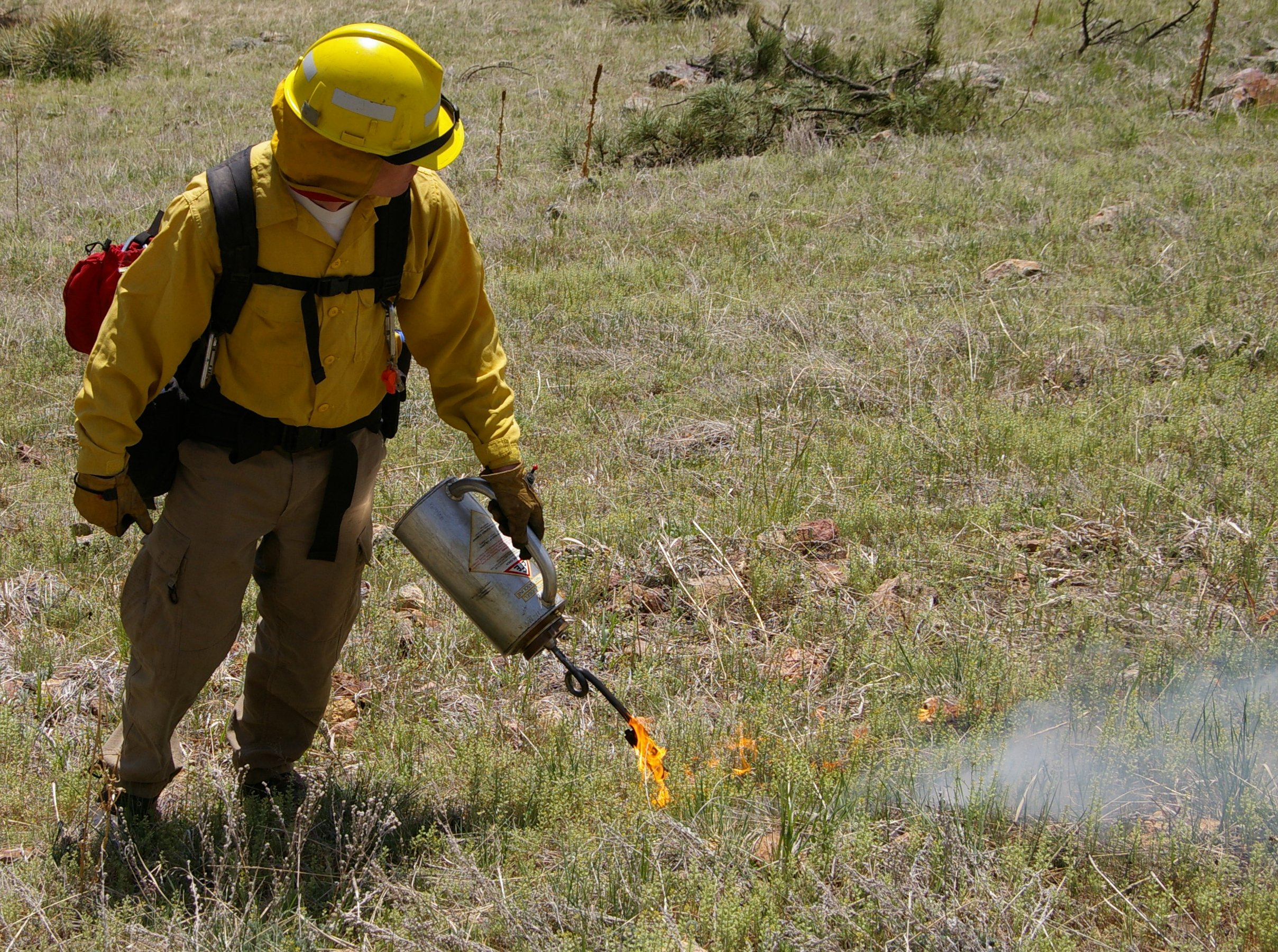
Using a driptorch to ignite a prescribed fire

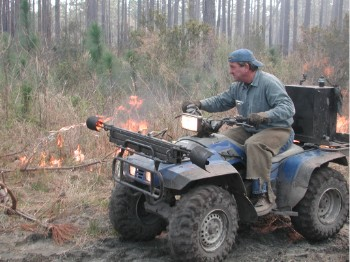
ATV mounted driptorch

== See also ==
- Fire flapper (tool)
- Flare
- Flare gun
- Glossary of wildland fire terms
- McLeod (tool)
- Pulaski (tool)
