= Edmund Zavitz =

Canadian conservationist

- Born: July 9, 1875; Ridgeway, Ontario
- Died: December 30, 1968 (aged 93); Brampton, Ontario
- Education: Master of Science in Forestry
- Alma mater: University of Michigan
- Occupation: Conservationist
- Known for: Known as the father of reforestation in Ontario

Edmund John Zavitz (July 9, 1875, in Ridgeway, Ontario – December 30, 1968, in Brampton, Ontario) is known as the father of reforestation in Ontario.

In his early years, he worked as a general labourer. He later completed his Bachelor of Arts at McMaster University in 1903. It is there that he gained an interest in conservation and reforestation. After studying forestry for a year at Yale University, he graduated from the University of Michigan with the degree of Master of Science in Forestry in 1905. He was then appointed lecturer at the Ontario Agricultural College in Guelph. In 1912, he took a position at Ontario's Department of Lands, Forests and Mines as the first provincial forester. In 1924 he rose to the position of Deputy Minister and in 1935 was appointed Chief of Reforestation. He is the author of many landmark reports and handbooks on reforestation. The Forest Fires Prevention Act and the establishment of the provincial air service are attributed to him. A highlight of his noteworthy career was the establishment of the St. Williams tree nursery in 1908, the first of its kind in Ontario. It is there that a plaque commemorating his contributions was placed in 1957.

== Key publications ==
- Report on the Reforestation of Wastelands in Southern Ontario, 1909
- Hardwood Trees of Ontario, 1959
- E.J. Zavitz Recollections, 1875-1964, a publication of the Department of Lands and Forest of Ontario
- Fifty Years of Reforestation in Ontario, 1961
