= McLeod (tool) =

Two-sided tool

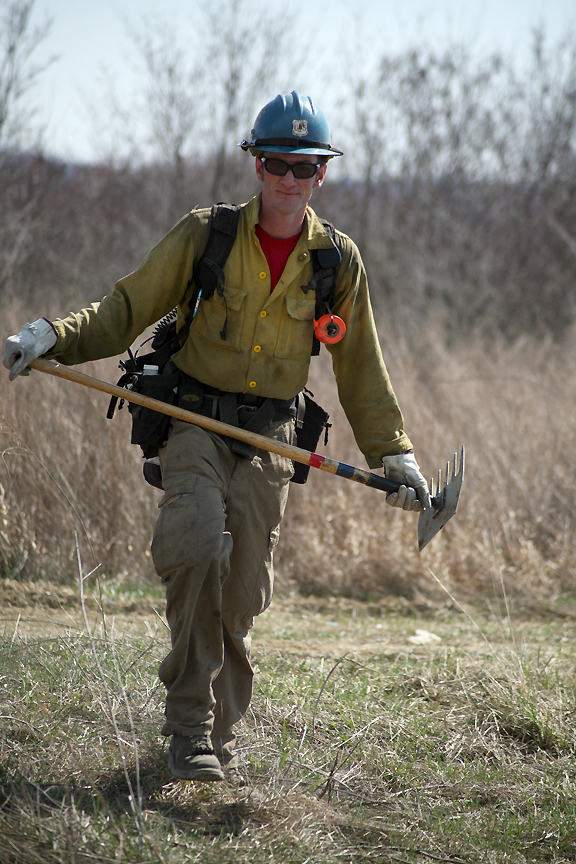
Firefighter carrying a McLeod in a field

A McLeod tool (or rakehoe) is a two-sided blade—one a rake with coarse tines, one a flat sharpened hoe—on a long wooden handle. It is a standard tool during wildfire suppression and trail restoration. The combination tool was created in 1905 by Malcolm McLeod, a United States Forest Service ranger at the Sierra National Forest.

The McLeod was originally designed to rake fire lines with the teeth and cut branches and sod with the sharpened hoe edge. It is also used for finishing and maintaining hiking trails.

== Desirable traits ==
The McLeod remains a favorite tool among many foresters for hand tool required ground work. The weight and balance of the McLeod allows for more effective turf busting than its lighter weight counterparts. Furthermore, because of its head design, the tool can be stood upright without needing to penetrate the soil, allowing for a safer "standby" configuration, reducing tripping hazards and increasing visibility, thus effectively reducing the chances that the tool is lost in the woods. Versions of the tool with flat heads can also be used as a tamp, ideal for building paths.

== See also ==
- Driptorch
- Fire flapper
- Fire rake
- Flare
- Halligan bar
- Pulaski (tool)
