= Fire flapper =

Type of fire extinguisher

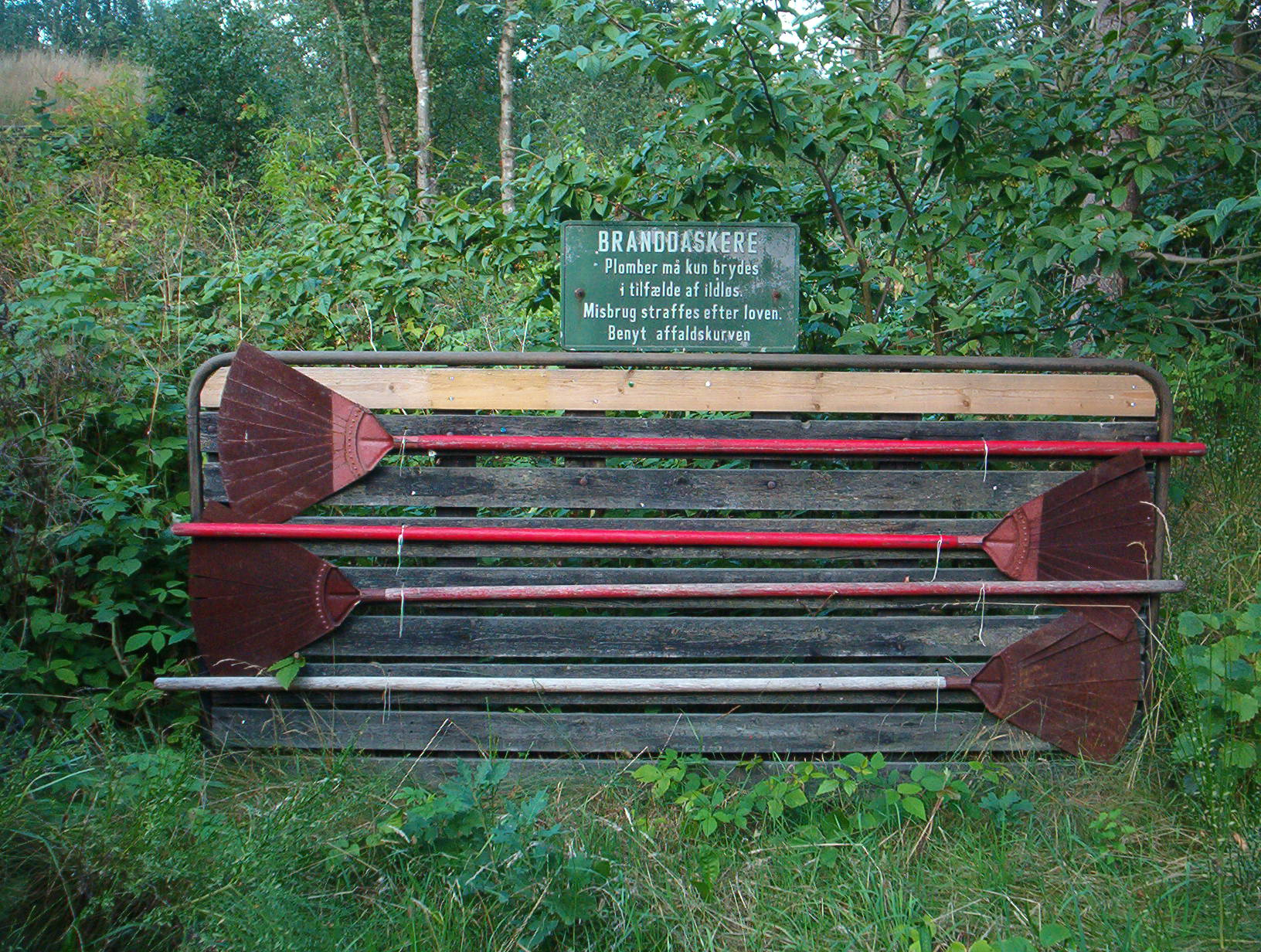
Four steel flappers in Denmark

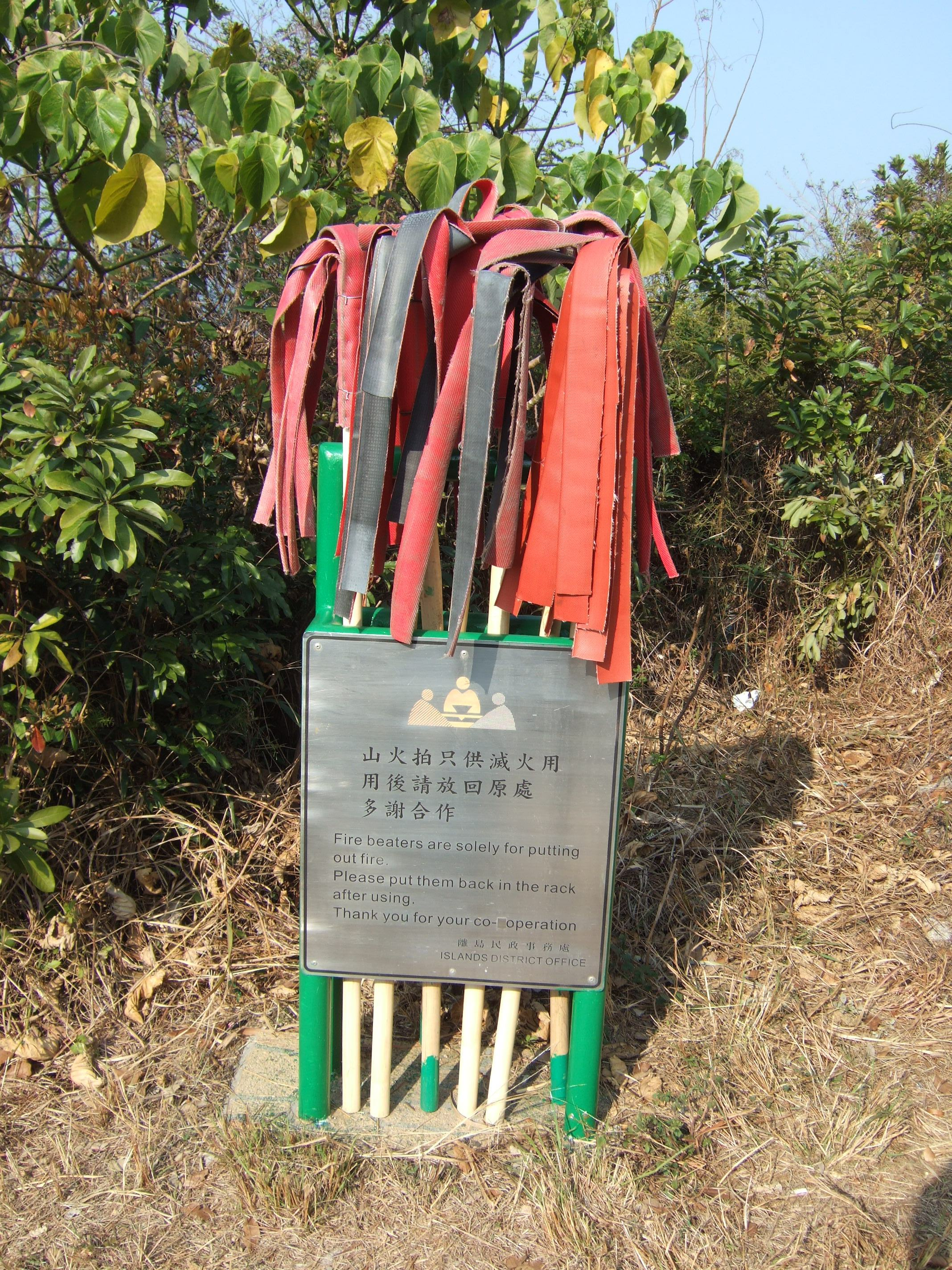
Fire-beaters on the island of Cheung Chau, Hong Kong

A flapper is a wildland firefighting tool that resembles a broom or a leaf rake with wide, overlapping metal bristles in the form of a hand fan. It is also called a swatter or a beater. It is designed for extinguishing minor fires in rural areas such as heaths. A flapper is built with a long handle and a series of lamellae which allows firefighters to stand well back from the fire. The lamellae are constructed in either rubber or steel, though practically any other fire-resistant material could be used.

The fire is attacked from the upwind side by lightly swatting out the flames or embers with the thick flap. When the flapper hits the ground, the oxygen supply to the fire is stopped and the fire will be extinguished. Where ground cover is short, the flapper can be dragged along the fire edge to smother the fire. If used too hard it can add more oxygen to the fire. It is often recommended to either hose water on the area or keep it under observation, as there will always be a risk of it flaring up later.

Due to a flapper's small size it is unfit for use against a blazing forest fire or large burning fields. The tool's design makes it only suitable for minor flames or glows within a limited area. It is commonly used in fire mop-up operations. For fire fighting in larger areas it is much more convenient to take out hoses from a fire engine and spray selected areas. Alternatively a water cannon from a water tender can be used.

A flapper is often part of the standard equipment on a fire engine and may also be set up inside and around forests and at heaths in order to take immediate action if a fire is seen.

The flapper's technique has been developed from using a wet green pine bough, and wet burlap sacks in the rural south US, to swat the fire known as "wet sacking" a fire.

== See also ==
- Driptorch
- Fire triangle
- McLeod (tool)
- Pulaski (tool)
