= Glossary of firefighting =

Firefighting jargon includes a diverse lexicon of both common and idiosyncratic terms. One problem that exists in trying to create a list such as this is that much of the terminology used by a particular department is specifically defined in their particular standing operating procedures, such that two departments may have completely different terms for the same thing. For example, depending on whom one asks, a safety team may be referred to as a standby, a RIT or RIG or RIC (rapid intervention team/group/crew), or a FAST (firefighter assist and search team). Furthermore, a department may change a definition within its SOP, such that one year it may be RIT, and the next RIG or RIC.

The variability of firefighter jargon should not be taken as a rule; some terms are fairly universal (e.g. stand-pipe, hydrant, chief). But keep in mind that any term defined here may be department- or region-specific, or at least more idiosyncratic than one may realize.

== A ==
- 3D zone control: The strategy of 3D zone control intended to improve the safety of firefighters operating inside a burning structure. It attempts to safeguard the immediate locality of any space occupied by firefighters in resorting to various defensive actions that (a) confine the fire; (b) remove combustion products safely and effectively; or (c) mitigate dangers in the hot-gas layers. The overall tactical objective is to provide more permanent levels of protection in structural compartments (safe zones), from which firefighters may operate in various fire & rescue roles.
- A-side: "Alpha" side, Front of the fire building, usually front door facing street, side with visible address but may be facing parking area where first apparatus arrives; other sides labeled B (left), C (rear), D (right) in a clockwise manner, as necessary when speaking of or staffing structure fire sectors.
- Above-ground storage tank: Storage tank that is not buried. Compare underground storage tank. Unburied tanks are more prone to physical damage, and leaks are released to the air or ground, rather than the soil surrounding a buried tank.
- Accelerant: flammable fuel (often liquid) used by some arsonists to increase size or intensity of fire. May also be accidentally introduced when HAZMAT becomes involved in fire.
- Accountability: The process of emergency responders (fire, police, SAR, emergency medical, etc.) checking in with or announcing to an incident commander or accountability officer that they have arrived on scene of an incident. Through the accountability system, each person is tracked throughout the incident until released from the scene by the incident commander or accountability officer. During an extended operation, an accountability "roll-call" may be performed at specified intervals. This is becoming a standard in the emergency services arena primarily for the safety of emergency personnel. This system may implement a name tag system or personal locator device (tracking device used by each individual that is linked to a computer).
- AFA: Automatic fire alarm/actuating fire alarm/activated fire alarm
- Aircraft rescue and firefighting (ARFF): a special category of firefighting that involves the response, hazard mitigation, evacuation and possible rescue of passengers and crew of an aircraft involved in an airport ground emergency.
- Air-track: The route by which the air enters the structure to the fire and the subsequent path the heated smoke takes to exit the structure. Also referred to as flow path.
- Active Service Firefighter (China): A defunct term used prior to 2018 for China Fire Services firefighters, who were People's Armed Police personnel and were treated as military personnel.
- Alarm: (1) system for detecting and reporting unusual conditions, such as smoke, fire, flood, loss of air, HAZMAT release, etc.; (2) a specific assignment of multiple fire companies and/or units to a particular incident, usually of fire in nature; (3) centralized dispatch center for interpreting alarms and dispatching resources. See fire alarm control panel.
- All companies working: Status report at fire scene indicating that available manpower is busy, and more resources may become necessary if incident is not controlled soon.
- Ammonium nitrate: component of ANFO; contents of two ships that exploded in Texas City disaster, killing over 500 people, including all 27 volunteer firefighters at the scene; as well as in warehouses in the port of Beirut.
- ANFO: Ammonium nitrate and fuel oil combination making a high explosive.
- Apparatus (U.S.) / Appliance (U.K.): A term usually used by firefighters describing a piece of mobile firefighting equipment, such as a pumper, a tanker, a ladder truck, etc.
- Arson: the crime of maliciously (or perhaps recklessly) setting fire to property, especially a dwelling. Punishable in various degrees, depending upon the circumstances. Occasionally occurs as a psychotic act of a mentally ill firefighter.
- Authority having jurisdiction (or AHJ): organization or agency with legal authority over a given type of incident (e.g., fire, EMS, SAR, arson, HAZMAT); may change or overlap as incident changes, as where fire becomes arson investigation once danger is over, or motor vehicle accident becomes police business after vehicle extrication, fire, and HAZMAT issues are complete.
- Auto-aid: An enhanced form of mutual aid agreement between one or more departments or districts, under which a mutual aid response can be dispatched "automatically" without prior permission from a chief officer.
- Autoextended fire: structure fire that has gone out a window or other opening on one floor and ignited materials above, on another floor or other space (attic, cockloft).
- Auto ignition temperature (AIT): The temperature at which a gas/air mixture will self-ignite. As the temperature increases the lower flammable limit (LFL) will approach zero. Also known as spontaneous ignition temperature (SIT).
- Available flow: total amount of water that can be put on a fire, depending upon water supply, pump size, hoses, and distance to the fire. Incident commander must assess available flow to determine whether additional apparatus or streams are required. See Fire flow requirement.

== B ==
- BA set: Breathing apparatus set consisting of a face-mask and compressed air cylinder. Two types SDBA and EDBA. SDBA or standard duration breathing apparatus has one cylinder and supplies about 30 minutes of air. EDBA or extended duration breathing apparatus has two cylinders and supplies about 60 minutes of air.
- Backdraft: A fire phenomenon caused when heat and heavy smoke (unburned fuel particles) accumulate inside a compartment, depleting the available air, and then oxygen/air is re-introduced, completing the fire triangle and causing rapid combustion.
- Backfiring: Also known as a "controlled burn," it's a tactic mostly used in wildland firefighting associated with indirect attack, by intentionally setting fire to fuels inside the control line. Most often used to contain a rapidly spreading fire, placing control lines at places where the fire can be fought on the firefighter's terms. This technique has been used in rapidly spreading urban fires, especially in San Francisco following the 1906 earthquake.
- Back burning: Australian term, for backfiring, above.
- Backflow preventer: Automatic valve used in hose accessories to ensure water flows only in one direction. Used in permanent fire department connections (FDC) to sprinklers and dry standpipes, as well as portable devices used in firefighting.
- Backstretching: Laying a supply line from the vicinity of the fire structure to a hydrant. (Typically laid from the hydrant toward the fire on the way in.)
- Bank down: What the smoke does as it fills a room, banks down to the floor, creating several layers of heat and smoke at different temperatures—the coolest at the bottom.
- Bail-out. The act of completing a quick egress away from a fire room, on a ladder. This is done if flashover conditions are imminent.
- Boiling liquid expanding vapor explosion (BLEVE): Explosion of a pressure tank containing an overheated material when the vapor expansion rate exceeds the pressure relief capacity (e.g., steam boiler or LPG tank). If the contents are flammable, the rapidly released vapor may react in a secondary fuel-air explosion, usually violent and spectacular.
- Bomber: Australian term for fixed wing fire-fighting aircraft. Also called "water bomber" or "borate bomber".
- Box (alarm): a term used to describe a preplanned response to an incident type and location, ensuring appropriate personnel and equipment are available as quickly as possible. The term is typically combined with a number identifying the specific response instructions. For example, "Box 25598" corresponded to Alvernia High School in Chicago and enumerated firefighting companies to be dispatched when an alarm from that location was received. Historically, box instructions were listed on cards and dictated by building types and geographic area. A building known to have hazardous materials will trigger deployment of HAZMAT equipment in addition to standard truck and engine companies. The box can also include escalation instructions. Modern computer-aided dispatch supports fine-grained variation to the box based on times of year, weather, or severity of incident. Incident commanders will instruct dispatchers to "fill the box" when the initial investigation of an alarm confirms a working fire and all the planned companies are necessary, or to "terminate the box" if the incident is resolved and the responding companies are no longer needed. The box term derives from the historical use of numbered fire alarm pull boxes that were commonplace in cities during the 19th and 20th Centuries.
- Buffer zone: The creation of a 'buffer-zone' implies the use of 3D defensive actions to reduce potential for an ignition of fire gases in the immediate area of a structure occupied by firefighters. This may create a temporary and more local zone of safety for firefighters, although offering far less protection than a 'safe-zone'.
- Buggy: A term usually used for the chief's vehicle, a reference back when the chief would respond in a horse drawn buggy. In wildland fire "buggy" is slang for "crew transport." Type I crews are referred as "Interagency Hotshot Crews" (20-21 people) that have crew transports permanently assigned to them and almost all the transports use the same model configuration with no or little differation for the different agencies that have hotshot crews. Hotshot crews have two crew transports and a superintendents vehicle, which is a pickup sized (one ton) with a utility box configuration. Hotshot crews are not the only type of crew and less experienced crews are called Type II crews that may not have vehicles permanently assigned to them. It is rare to hear a crew transport called same. Almost everyone on a wildland fire will say "buggy" instead.
- Burn building: Former official US term for a live training structure. Still commonly used in the US, although the term was discontinued for official use in the US in 2007.
- Bus: Another term for ambulance (NYC).
- Bushfire: Australian term, for wildfire, below.

== C ==
- Call firefighter: In the U.S., call firefighters respond as needed on a part-time basis to all types of emergencies. Call firefighters train with their local engine companies in their districts. Call firefighters are used in three different ways. “First Responder" call firefighter units, are those units that are staffed entirely by paid call firefighters. These firefighters respond to all emergency incidents within their jurisdictional areas and are supported by full-time companies from adjoining jurisdictions. "Supplemental" call firefighter units are those units that staff a second engine company from a station that is also staffed by a full-time company. These units respond to all multi-unit responses in their district, and cover the station when the career companies are committed. "Augmentation" call firefighters are assigned to an existing career company and respond directly to the scene to augment that company's staffing. See also Retained firefighter (U.K.)
- Can: Informal term for an air pressurized water (APW) extinguisher.
- Career firefighter: (U.S.) A person whose primary employment is as a firefighter for a municipality or other agency or company and who derives the majority of his earned income working in the fire service. See also wholetime firefighter (U.K.)
- Career firefighter (专职消防员): (China) The Chinese term for volunteer firefighters.
- Charge a hose: To make water pressure available on a hose in final preparation for its use. This is done on the scene after the hose is deployed, but prior to entering the fire danger area. (Also known as "charge the line")
- Charged hose: A hose that is filled with water and pressurized; ready to use. The charged line is much more difficult to move than one not yet charged.
- Chauffeur: See Engineer.
- Chief officer: An executive officer of the fire department, as contrasted with a tactical company officer. Typical chief officers include the fire chief, assistant and deputy fire chief, battalion or division or district chiefs (who may each supervise fire captains), watch commanders and the Scottish Fire Master.
- Chimney fire: Fast and intense fire in a chimney flue in which accumulated creosote and other combustion byproducts ignite. These often extend fire into the roof or attic, especially with defective chimneys or when the mortar becomes hot enough to melt.
- Class A: A fire involving combustibles such as wood, paper, and other natural materials. See Fire classes.
- Class B: A fire involving flammable liquids such as gasoline or other fuels. See Fire classes.
- Class C: An electrical fire. See Fire classes.
- Class D: A fire involving metals, such as sodium, titanium, magnesium, potassium, uranium, lithium, plutonium and calcium. See Fire classes.
- Class E (Europe/Australia): A composite Class A/Class B fire that is not also a Class C fire.
- Class F (Europe/Australia): See Class K.
- Class K: A fire involving cooking oils. Technically, this is a subclass of Class B. See Fire classes.
- Cockloft: A structural space above ceiling and below rafters, often connecting adjacent occupancies and permitting fire to spread laterally, often unseen.
- Collapse zone: The area around a structure that would contain debris if the building were to collapse. This is generally 1.5x the height of the structure.
- Combustion: When materials smolder or burn. See main article for technical details.
- Commissioner: Civilian administrator of the fire services, appointed or elected in some cities, such as the New York City Fire Commissioner.
- Company: A group of firefighters organized as a team, led by a fire officer, and equipped to perform certain operational functions. The firefighters in a company nearly always work on the same vehicle, though on different shifts. Compare with platoon and unit.
- Company officer : A fire officer, typically a lieutenant or captain, who leads a team of two or more firefighters in a tactical company.
- Compartment fire: An "Isolated" fire, or a fire which is "boxed in" or "closed off" from the rest of the structure. An example of this is a fire in a room where all the windows and doors are closed preventing the fire from spreading to other rooms.
- Confined space: Usually refers to a "confined space rescue." This involves a space that may have very limited access, little or no room to maneuver, poor air or light, and very likely other hazards. A trench cave-in, a collapsed building, a sewer or utility vault rescue, or a problem in and around industrial equipment are some examples.
- Conflagration: A large, typically urban, fire involving numerous structures; loosely defined as enveloping an area equivalent to one or more square blocks. Compare with firestorm.
- Contained Fire: A fire restricted to boundaries established by fire fighters.
- Crash tender: A pump capable of spraying foam used at airports.
- Crew resource management (CRM): Training developed by NASA based on the concept that the primary cause of the majority of aviation accidents is human error and problems with interpersonal communication in particular. The training has been adapted for the fire service and teaches firefighters the correct way to question orders on an emergency scene. It also helps supervisors understand that the questioning of an order should not be interpreted as a threat to their authority.
- Cross lay: Arrangement of hose on a pumper such that it can be quickly unloaded from either side of the apparatus; often pre-connected to a pump outlet and equipped with a suitable nozzle. Also known as Mattydale Lay.

== D ==
- Dead lay: A load of hose on a pumper, but not connected to a pump outlet. Often used for larger supply lines.
- Defensive attack: A primarily exterior form of attack often used when fighting the fire directly or from within a structure is not feasible due to dangers from direct flame, heat, structural collapse or the presence of hazardous materials. Often structures which are fully involved are attacked defensively with the main goal being the protection of nearby exposures. This form of attack is far less effective than an Offensive or Direct attack. Also known as "surround and drown."
- Deflagration: An explosion with a propagation front traveling at subsonic speeds, as compared to supersonic detonation.
- Denver drill: A drill that essentially re-creates the rescue of Denver firefighter Mark Langvardt. It incorporates the use of a leveraged body and an inclined plane (bio-mechanics) to get a victim up and out of a narrow window in a narrow hallway (the Denver Prop).
- Denver prop: A training prop designed after the actual dimensions of the confined area that claimed 16-year veteran fire fighter Mark Langvardt's life in 1992. Specifically, it is a 'hallway' 28" wide, 8' long with a window at one end that is 20" wide by 28" high and the sill is 42" from the floor. The prop is used for the Denver Drill.
- Direct attack: A fire attack in which hoses are advanced inside a structure and hose streams are directed onto burning materials.
- Discharge flow: The amount of water flowing from a fire hydrant when it is opened; compare to static flow and residual flow.
- Determinate: (Response determinate) The level and type of response needed based on information provided by a caller reporting an incident. Often utilizing a structured questioning flow chart or algorithm.
- Dispatch: Refers to person or place designated for handling a call for help by alerting the specific resources necessary.
- Draft: The process of pumping water from a static source below the pump.
- DOS: Death on scene. Also known as "DOA" - Dead on arrival.
- Drills: training during which an emergency is simulated and the trainees or personnel go through the steps of responding as if it were a real emergency.
- Drop tank: A portable tank used at fire scenes to store water from Tenders for Engines
- Dry riser: An empty pipe in a building which hoses can be connected to, so that water can be brought to the floor of a fire.

== E ==
- Electrical fire: A fire in which the primary source of heat is electricity, resulting in combustion of adjacent insulation and other materials; may be hazardous to attempt to extinguish using water.
- EMR: Emergency medical responder.
- EMS: Emergency medical service(s).
- EMT: Emergency medical technician(s).
- Engine: A fire suppression vehicle that has a water pump and, typically, carries hoses, other equipment and a limited supply of water.
- Engineer: A firefighter responsible for driving the engine to the scene of the call and operation of the pumps on an engine, to provide sufficient water to the firefighters on the hose. The term may be either a position title or a rank; usage varies among departments.
- Engine company: A group of firefighters assigned to an apparatus with a water pump and equipped with firehose and other tools related to fire extinguishment.
- Engine house: [archaic] A firehouse housing an engine company.
- Engine pressure: The pressure in a fire hose measured at the outlet of the pump.
- Enhanced 9-1-1: Electronic system for automatic correlation of physical telephone lines with information about the location of the caller—a useful tool for dispatchers when the caller has an emergency but cannot speak.
- Evacuation: Removal of personnel from a dangerous area, in particular, a HAZMAT incident, burning building, or other emergency. Also refers to act of removing firefighters from a structure in danger of collapsing.
- Evolution: Uniform sequence of practiced steps by squad carrying out common tasks such as selection and placement of ladders, stowing hoses in hose bed, putting hoses and tools into service in particular patterns; intended to result in predictability during emergencies.
- Exothermic reaction: Chemical reaction giving off heat in the process, such as combustion.
- Explorer: a young adult, between 14 and 21, who learns the basics of firefighting.
- Exposure: Property near fire that may become involved by transfer of heat or burning material from main fire, typically by convection or radiation. May range from 40 feet (12 m) to several miles, depending on size and type of fire or explosion.
- Exterior attack: A method of extinguishing a fire which does not involve entering the structure. Often used when so much of the building is involved in fire that there is little or no benefit to risking firefighter safety by inserting them into the structure. May be a temporary measure when there are not sufficient personnel on scene to form an entry team and a rescue team (to rescue the entry team). Also known as surround and drown. Compare Interior attack.
- Extrication: removal of a trapped victim such as a vehicle extrication, confined space rescue, or trench rescue; sometimes using hydraulic spreader, Jaws of Life, or other technical equipment.
- ETOH: the chemical abbreviation for ethanol, or ethyl alcohol, also used to describe someone believed to be intoxicated.

== F ==
- FAST (or F.A.S.T.): Firefighter assist and search team (also called rapid entry team or rapid intervention team/crew)—firefighters assigned to stand by for rescue of other firefighters inside a structure; an implementation to support the two-in, two-out rule; may have specialized training, experience and tools. While all of these versions of the name for a firefighter rescue crew either have been used or continue to be used in several areas, the National Incident Management System (NIMS) has determined that rapid intervention crew ("RIC") will be the national term. Current U.S. federally mandated training programs are in the process of standardizing this and other terms under DHS and FEMA. F.A.S.T operations became officially mandated after the Worcester, MA Cold Storage fire, which claimed the lives of 6 firefighters, after they became disoriented in the smoke and subsequently ran out of air.
- FDC (Fire department connection): Location in which pumping apparatus hooks to a buildings standpipe and or sprinkler system. Usually a 3″ female connection.
- Fire barn: Another term for fire station. Originally it referred to a stable which housed horses and the fire apparatus which they hauled. Although it may be colloquially employed to describe any such structure, the term is now most commonly used in rural areas.
- Firebreak: Especially in hilly or mountainous areas, roads or paths cut through brush with a tractor, bulldozer or other construction equipment. The purpose of these is to have an area with no brush, and thus, no fuel, so that a fire will hopefully burn out rather than jumping to another area with brush. Also to ensure vehicular access to brush areas.
- Fire buff Someone with considerable interest (a fan) in fire fighting and emergency services, while not being an active member of these services.
- Fire code (Fire safety code): regulations for fire prevention and safety involving flammables, explosives and other dangerous operations and occupancies.
- Fire complex: (U.S. complex fire) Area of fires - many of the areas have multiple fires with multiple fronts.
- Fire engineering: Scientific design of materials, structures and processes for fire safety
- Fire escape: A building structure arranged outside to assist in safe evacuation of occupants during an emergency; may connect horizontally beyond a fire wall or vertically to a roof or (preferably) to the ground, perhaps with a counter-weighted span to deny access to intruders.
- Fire Fighter Fatality Investigation and Prevention Program (FFFIPP)—Program administered by the National Institute for Occupational Safety and Health (NIOSH), a department of the Centers for Disease Control (CDC). It performs independent investigations of firefighter fatalities in the United States, also referred to as line of duty deaths (LODD). The program's goals are: 1.) to better define the characteristics of line of duty deaths among firefighters, 2.) to develop recommendations for the prevention of deaths and injuries, and 3.) to disseminate prevention strategies to the fire service.
- Firefighter: People who respond to fire alarms and other emergencies for fire suppression, rescue, and related duties.
- Firefighter assist and search team: See FAST.
- Fire flow: The amount of water being pumped onto a fire, or required to extinguish a hypothetical fire. A critical calculation in light of the axiom that an ordinary fire will not be extinguished unless there is sufficient water to remove the heat of the fire.
- Fire gas ignition: ‘an ignition of accumulated fire gases and combustion products, existing in, or transported into, a flammable state. There are a wide range of events that can be conveniently grouped under the heading Fire Gas Ignitions (FGI's) and such phenomena can generally be defined as -. Any such ignition is usually caused by the introduction of an ignition source into a pre-mixed state of flammable gases; or the transport of such gases towards a source of ignition; or the transport of a fuel-rich mixture of gases into an area containing oxygen and an ignition source. The ignition is not reliant on the action of airflow/oxygen in the direction of an ignition source, which is clearly recognised as a backdraft event.
- Fireground: The operational area at the scene of a fire; area in which incident commander is in control. Also used as name of radio frequency to be used by units operating in the fireground, as in “Responding units switch to fireground.”
- Fire hall Another term for fire station.
- Fire hazard: Materials, structures or processes that may result in creating a fire, permitting a fire to grow undetected, or preventing people from escaping a fire.
- Firehouse: Another term for fire station.
- Fire hydraulics: The study of pumps, hoses, pipes, accessories and tools for moving water or other extinguishing agents from a water supply to a fire.
- Fire inspector: A person responsible for issuing permits and enforcing the fire code, including any necessary premises inspection, as before allowing (or during) a large indoor gathering.
- Fire line: A boundary of a fire scene established for public safety and to identify the area in which firefighters may be working.
- Fire load (Btu/sq ft): An estimate of the amount of heat that will be given off during ordinary combustion of all the fuel in a given space; e.g., a bedroom or a lumberyard. More casually, the amount and type of contents in a given space.
- Fire marshal: Administrative and investigative office for fire prevention and arson investigation.
- Fire officer: A person tasked with organizing and directing firefighters. See also company officer and chief officer.
- Fire point: temperature at which materials give off flammable gases that will sustain fire, typically higher than flash point. Temperature at flashover.
- Fire police: Special constables attached to a fire department, tasked with ensuring the safety and security of emergency scenes as well as general assistance to the fire department and other agencies.
- Fire prevention: Fire safety; standards for minimizing fire hazards. In some departments also the name of the division tasked with promoting fire safety and fire code compliance in the community.
- Fire prevention week: An annual observation of fire safety education in the United States and Canada, often involving lectures or demonstrations by firefighters, sponsored by the National Fire Protection Association, since 1925.
- Fire-resistant: Materials designed or treated to have an increased fire point.
- Fire station: A structure which, in addition to housing apparatus and equipment, often includes living quarters and training facilities for the use of firefighting personnel when on-duty.
- Firestorm: A conflagration of great enough proportions to noticeably create its own wind conditions.
- Fire tetrahedron: The fire tetrahedron is based on the components of igniting or extinguishing a fire. Each component represents a property necessary to sustain fire: fuel, oxygen, heat, and chemical chain reaction. Extinguishment is based upon removing or hindering any one of these properties.
- Fire triangle: An outdated model for understanding the major components necessary for fire: heat, fuel and oxygen. See also fire tetrahedron for the currently used model in firefighting.
- Fire wall: Building structure designed to delay horizontal spread of a fire from one area of a building to another; often regulated by fire code and required to have self-closing doors, and fireproof construction.
- Fire warden: Appointed post for issuing rural fire permits in a given jurisdiction and maintaining equipment and manpower readiness for responding to wildland fires.
- Fire watch: Fixed or mobile patrols that watch for signs of fire or fire hazards so that any necessary alarm can be quickly raised or preventive steps taken. Commonly established at commercial, industrial and multi-occupancy structures, usually by building and property Maintenance or Security personnel if the on site fire alarm and/or sprinkler/suppression system is out of service for repairs, or a Fire crew assigned to the scene after a large fire to stand watch for an extended period of time in the event of a rekindle. Also called "reflash watch."
- First due: Refers to either the first apparatus arriving on the scene of a fire or the area in which a company is expected to be the first to arrive on a fire scene.
- Fit test: Periodic test of how well the facepiece of an SCBA fits a particular firefighter.
- Flameover: Also known as rollover. The ignition of heated fire gasses at the ceiling level only. While dangerous to firefighters, this is not as deadly as Flashover.
- Flammable range, limits: The percentage mixture of fumes with air that will sustain fire; outside the limits the mixture is either too lean or too rich to burn.
- Flash point: Lowest temperature at which a material will emit vapor combustible in air mixture. Higher than Flame point of same material.
- Flashover: simultaneous ignition of combustible materials in a closed space, as when materials simultaneously reach their fire point; may also result in rollover.
- Foam: Extinguishing agent formed by mixing Foam concentrate with water and aerating the solution for expansion. Used for smothering large Class A or B fires. May be injected into fire streams at adjustable concentrations.
- Foam concentrate: Raw foam liquid as it rests in it storage container before the introduction of water and air.
- Forcible entry: gaining entry to an area using force to disable or bypass security devices, typically using force tools, sometimes using tools specialized for entry (e.g., Halligan, K-tool).
- Forward lay: Procedure of stringing water supply hose from a water source toward a fire scene; compare with Reverse lay.
- Freelancing: dangerous situation at an incident where an individual carries out tasks alone or without being assigned; violation of Personnel accountability procedures.
- Friction loss: Reduction of flow in a firehose caused by friction between the water and the lining of the hose. Depends primarily upon diameter, type and length of hose, and amount of water (GPM) flowing through.
- Frontage: The size of a building facing a street.
- Fuel-controlled fire: Free burning of a fire that is characterised by an air supply in excess of that which is required for complete combustion of the fuel source or available pyrolates.
- Fully involved: Term of size-up meaning fire, heat and smoke in a structure are so widespread that internal access must wait until fire streams can be applied.

== G ==
- Gas cooling or 3D water-fog: Branch technique where water spray in correct quantities can result in contraction of the gases without the over production of steam. May assist as a control measure in small compartment. This is not an extinguishing technique because it is still essential to apply water to the surfaces.
- GPM: gallons per minute or how many gallons are being pumped out of a piece of equipment every minute.
- GPM method ("gallons per minute"): Calculation of how much water, in GPM, will be necessary to extinguish a given volume of fire, under the circumstances (e.g., fuel class, containment, exposures, etc.).
- Grease fire: A fire involving any manner of cooking oil or other flammable cooking or lubricating materials. Also known as an F (Europe, Australia) or K fire (America).
- Goer: An incident with persons reported.
- Grab: Rescuing a person from building.
- Good access: the ability to access a patient or point of egress without assistance

== H ==
- Hand tub: A type of historical fire engine where a "tub" had to be filled by a bucket brigade and then pumped onto the fire by hand. An advancement from the hand tub was to a fire engine which was still pumped by hand but had a suction hose to supply water. Hand tubs were pulled to the fire by hand or some were designed to be pulled by horses.
- Hand jack: To advance a line (hose) manually rather that deploy it from the hose bed of a moving piece of apparatus. Usually applies to supply lines. See Skulldrag
- Hard line: A smaller hose about one inch in diameter used by firefighters to clean apparatus.
- Hazard: a source of danger of personal injury or property damage; fire hazard refers to conditions that may result in fire or explosion, or may increase spread of an accidental fire, or prevent escape from fire. Under worker safety and health regulations, employers have a general duty to provide a workplace free of hazards. See also fire prevention, and HAZMAT.
- HAZMAT: Hazardous materials, including solids, liquids, or gases that may cause injury, death, or damage if released or triggered.
- Head pressure: How the pressure of a water stream is measured. By measuring the 'breakover' point, the point where the water stream breaks apart and begins to fall back to the ground, of a stream of water aimed vertically into the air. This is typically done with a 1-inch-diameter (25 mm) hose and a fixed nozzle. Therefore, if a water stream breaks over at 50 ft (15 m), then it is said the pump has 50 feet (15 m) of head pressure. Current measurements of pumping capacity are now in GPM, Gallons Per Minute.
- Helitack: A rotary winged (helicopter) fire-fighting aircraft, such as the Erickson Skycrane which can be modified to hold 2100 gallons (9500L) of water or retardant.
- High-pressure system: A supplemental pump system used to pressurize the water supply, sometimes used during a large fire, or whenever more than one hydrant is being used.
- High-rise building: Any building taller than three or four stories, depending upon local usage, requiring firefighters to climb stairs or aerial ladders for access to upper floors.
- High-rise pack: A shoulder load of hose with a nozzle and other tools necessary to connect the hose to a standpipe.
- Hook ladder: Short ladder with a long hook at the top. The hook is used to smash a window and grip the window frame while the fire fighter climbs. Using one or two it is easy to go up and down floors beyond the reach of other ladders or when there's no space to pitch a ladder.
- Horizontal standpipe: An operation involving laying a long length of large diameter hose from a pumper toward a fire structure, typically with a gated wye at the end that allows the connection of a couple of hand lines. This effectively moves the water supply closer to the fire, and greatly extends the reach of the hand lines when the apparatus cannot be placed any closer to the fire structure.
- Hose pack: A hose pack is a backpack containing fire hose in a preconfigured arrangement, sometime completely made from fire hose without a bag.
- Fire hose vacuum: A small pneumatic device that removes residue air from the inside of a fire hose, thereby making it smaller and somewhat rigid
- Hotshot crew: An extensively trained group of approximately twenty people which specializes in wildfire suppression with little or no outside logistical support.
- Hot-wash: A meeting, typically held after an incident is over, to discuss the successes and failures of the response and tactics used to be better prepared for the next incident.
- Hot zone: contaminated area of HAZMAT incident that must be isolated; requires suitable protective equipment to enter and decontamination upon exit; minimum hot zone distance from unknown material with unknown release is 330 feet (United Nations Emergency Response Guidebook); surrounded by "warm zone" where decontamination takes place.

== I ==
- IAFF: Acronym, "International Association of Fire Fighters".
- IAP: Acronym, "Incident Action Plan" A plan consisting of the strategic goals, tactical objectives, and support requirements for the incident. All incidents require an action plan. For simple incidents, the action plan is not usually in written form, while large/complex incidents require the action plan to be documented in writing. When complete, the IAP will have a number of attachments.
- IDLH: Any situation deemed Immediately Dangerous to Life and Health. More narrowly defined by OSHA. See main IDLH article. An area of maximum danger to firefighters. Often requires increased Personnel accountability.
- IFSTA: Acronym, "International Fire Service Training Association". A major publisher of firefighter training materials.
- IMARP: Acronym, "Indiana Mutual Aid Response Plan". For the rapid activation and response of aid to a community in the event of a local disaster. These events can include a major fire, train derailments, hazardous materials incidents, wild land fires, domestic terrorism, and other events that may overwhelm the local fire department serving the community and its normal mutual aid resources.
- Incident commander (or IC): The officer in charge of all activities at an incident. See Incident Command System.
- Incident safety officer: The officer in charge of scene safety at an incident. See Incident Command System. Optional at any incident other than HAZMAT.
- Incipient stage fire: A small fire that may be extinguished using portable fire extinguishers or other means typically at hand.
- Indirect attack: Method of firefighting in which water is pumped onto materials above or near the fire so that the splash rains onto the fire, often used where a structure is unsafe to enter.
- Initial attack: First point of attack on a fire where hose lines or fuel separation are used to prevent further extension of the fire.
- Interface zone (also wildland/structural interface or urban/wildland interface): The zone where wildfires threaten structures or structural fires threaten wildlands, such as in residential areas adjacent to forests. This requires both wildland firefighting and structural firefighting in the same location, which involve very different tactics and equipment.
- Interior attack: Inserting a team of firefighters into the burning structure, in an attempt to extinguish a blaze from inside the structure, minimizing property damage from fire, smoke, and water. Requires a minimum of four fully equipped firefighters: an entry team of at least two to enter the structure and fight the fire, and two standing by to rescue or relieve the entry team (see two in, two out). If the entry team(s) cannot extinguish the blaze, may become an Exterior Attack.
- IMT: Acronym for incident management team. In the United States, there are predominantly five types of incident management teams (IMTs). An incident such as a wildland fire is initially managed by local fire departments or fire agencies, but if the fire becomes complex additional resources are called in to address the emergency, and higher levels of management training and capability are required. IMTs are "typed" according to the complexity of incidents they are capable of managing and are part of an incident command system.

To manage the logistical, fiscal, planning, operational, safety and community issues related to the incident/emergency, an Incident Management Team will provide the command and control infrastructure that is required.
Incident management starts as the smallest unit and escalates according to the complexity of the emergency. The five types of IMTs are as follows:
- Type 5: Local village and township level – a "pool" of primarily fire officers from several neighboring departments trained to serve in Command and General Staff positions during the first 6–12 hours of a major or complex incident.
- Type 4: City, county or fire district level – a designated team of fire, EMS, and possibly law enforcement officers from a larger and generally more populated area, typically within a single jurisdiction (city or county), activated when necessary to manage a major or complex incident during the first 6–12 hours and possibly transition to a Type 3 IMT.
- Type 3: State or metropolitan area level – a standing team of trained personnel from different departments, organizations, agencies, and jurisdictions within a state or DHS Urban Area Security Initiative (UASI) region, activated to support incident management at incidents that extend beyond one operational period. Type 3 IMTs will respond throughout the state or large portions of the state, depending upon state-specific laws, policies, and regulations.
- Type 2: National and state level – a federally or state-certified team; has less training, staffing and experience than Type 1 IMTs, and is typically used on smaller scale national or state incidents. There are 35 Type 2 IMTs currently in existence, and operate through interagency cooperation of federal, state and local land and emergency management agencies.
- Type 1: National and state level – a federally or state-certified team; is the most robust IMT with the most training and experience. Sixteen Type 1 IMTs are now in existence, and operate through interagency cooperation of federal, state and local land and emergency management agencies.
Although the primary purpose is for wildfire response, an Incident Management Team can respond to a wide range of emergencies, including fires, floods, earthquakes, hurricanes, tornadoes, tsunami, riots, spilling of hazardous materials, and other natural or human-caused incidents.
The five subsystems of an incident management team are as follows:
- Incident command system (ICS) an on-scene structure of management-level positions suitable for managing any incident.
- Training development and delivery of training courses.
- Qualifications and certification national standards for qualifications and certification for ICS positions.
- Publications management development, control, sources, and distribution of NIIMS publications provided by the National Wildfire Coordinating Group (NWCG).
- Supporting Technology and systems used to support an emergency response, such as Geographic Information Systems (GIS), orthophoto mapping, National Fire Danger Rating System, remote automatic weather stations, automatic lightning detection systems, infrared technology, and communications

- ISO rating: (Insurance Services Office public protection classification rating) This is a rating published by the Insurance Services Office. Insurance companies, in many states, use this number to determine homeowner insurance premiums. Recently some insurance companies, including State Farm, have now adopted a per-zip-code, actual loss, based system in several states and no longer use the ISO (PPC) system.
- Irons: The flathead axe mated with the halligan bar. Firefighters often refer to these as the crossed irons, or married irons, because the halligan bar can fit to the axe head.

== J ==
- Jumping-sheet: The sheet held by a group of firefighters onto which people caught in a burning building can jump. (obsolete)
- Job: Northeast US Firefighter slang for structure fire
- Junior firefighter: (US) a young adult between the ages of 14 and 18 that learns the basics of firefighting from firefighters usually in a volunteer fire company

== L ==
- Ladder company: A group of fire fighters, officers and engineers that staff a ladder truck.
- Ladder slide (or ladder bail) A technique used to rapidly bail out of a window and onto a ladder face-first. After exiting the window, the firefighter quickly rotates 180 degrees to descend the ladder normally.
- Layout: Establishing water supply. Usually done by first due engine company. Telling the next due in, to pick it up.
- Lean: A fuel-air mixture that contains more air than fuel (unburned smoke). When the right ratio is present, backdraft or flashover can occur.
- Level I, II, III Incident: A HAZMAT term denoting the severity of the incident and the type of response that may be necessary, where Level III is the largest or most dangerous. In some jurisdictions, level 0 is used for a small hazmat incident that can be handled by the responding fire department, but the incident commander wants either a phone or on scene consultation with someone from the hazmat team.
- Life safety code: NFPA publication. Originally known as the "Building Exits Code."
- Life line: A trademark for a wireless emergency call unit that triggers a telephone call to an emergency dispatcher when a button is pressed.
- Line or hose line a line of hose, referred to by its size i.e. 1"3/4, 1 inch, 2 Inch, 5 inch
- Line loss: See friction loss.
- LODD (line of duty death) The death of a fire fighter while on-duty.
- Live line: A fire hose under pressure from a pump. Also, an energized electrical line that may cause a hazard to firefighters.
- Live in: A firefighter who typically lives in the fire house or station
- Live training structure: A structure that is used for hands-on training. Can be custom built or acquired and modified for the purpose.
- Loaded stream: A nonfreezing solution of an alkali metal salt (usually potassium acetate, citrate, lactate, or a carbonate) with water. The solution has long been used to adapt pressurized water-type fire extinguishers to freezing temperatures. When applied as a stream, the mixture exhibits somewhat enhanced fire suppression qualities against certain types of fires (such as shallow petroleum grease and cooking oil fires) compared to plain water, though is not a suitable replacement for Class B or Class K extinguishers. Class K extinguishers use a type of loaded stream known as "wet chemical" which, with a special mist-generating applicator, is highly effective in extinguishing cooking oil fires. In the form of a spray or fine mist, loaded stream agents (particularly potassium lactate and potassium acetate) have exhibited nearly 10x the effectiveness of water mist against jet fuel fires, and are being investigated as a possible replacement for halon 1301 in certain applications.
- Lower flammable limit (LFL): The lowest percentage concentration by volume of flammable vapour or gas in air which will burn with a flame under specified conditions.

== M ==
- Make pumps: To raise the number of pumps at an incident e.g. "make pumps 10"
- Mass casualty incident (MCI): Any incident that produces a large number of injured persons requiring emergency medical treatment and transportation to a medical facility. The exact number of patients that makes an incident "mass casualty" is defined by departmental procedures and may vary from area to area.
- Master box: A primary fire alarm relay box connected to a building alarm system which monitors fire alarm pull stations and detectors throughout the building and automatically relays any in-building alarm to the local municipal fire department. Usually accompanied by an Annunciator Panel which records by indicator lights or other devices exactly where the pull station or detector that has been activated is located within the building. Common in multi-story office and apartment buildings equipped with sprinkler systems or smoke and heat detectors.
- Master stream: (also monitor, deluge gun) A large nozzle, either portable or fixed to a pumper, capable of throwing large amounts of water relatively long distances.
- Mattydale lay (Mattydale load) : The concept of storing preconnected attack lines on an engine, as well as storing them such that they are presented at the sides of the apparatus instead of the rear. Commonly called a cross lay, the technique allows for rapid deployment of attack lines from either side of the apparatus.
- Means of egress: The way out of a building during an emergency; may be by door, window, hallway, or exterior fire escape; local building codes will often dictate the size. location and type according to the number of occupants and the type of occupancy.
- Multiple alarms: A request by an incident commander for additional personnel and apparatus. [e.g. "Send me a 2nd Alarm." "Dispatch a 2nd Alarm." "Ring a 2nd Alarm."] Each additional alarm (level) typically includes a predetermined set of additional apparatus and personnel, which will vary by department and sometimes by specific type of incident.
- Mutual aid: An agreement between nearby fire companies to assist each other during emergencies by responding with available manpower and apparatus. If these resources can be requested or dispatched without getting specific approval from a chief officer at the time of an incident, this is sometimes referred to as "automatic" mutual aid.
- MVA: Motor vehicle accident
- MDC: Mobile data computer

== N ==
- National Fire Fighter Near-Miss Reporting System - Program developed by the IAFC that prevents injuries and saves the lives of fire fighters by collecting, sharing and analyzing near-miss experiences. It gives firefighters the opportunity to learn from each other through real life experiences, formulates strategies to reduce firefighter injuries and fatalities, and attempts to enhance the safety culture of the fire service.
- Neutral plane: The separation between the overpressure region and the underpressure regions developed in a compartment fire (sometimes referred to as the smoke/air interface). The neutral plane can be seen quite clearly when thermal balance exists in the fire compartment. 3D firefighting techniques can assist to keep the NP as high as possible, which maximises visibility and makes conditions more bearable for entrapped occupants or firefighters. Maintaining the height of the neutral plane is a key principle in successful, safe and efficient compartment firefighting.
- NFPA: The National Fire Protection Association, a publisher which provides a methodology of developing a number of standards and practices for *firefighting, equipment, and fire protection in the United States, and also adopted in many other countries. Also, slang for "No Free Publications Available"; used as a criticism of publishers that produce "must-have" documents that are prohibitively expensive.
- NIOSH: National Institute for Occupational Safety and Health. A U.S. agency responsible for investigation of workplace deaths, including firefighters.
- NIMS: The National Incident Management System. A federally mandated program for the standardizing of command terminology and procedures. This standardizes communications between fire departments and other agencies. It is based upon simple terms that will be used nationwide. Currently, U.S. federally required training programs, from DHS and FEMA, are in the process of standardizing many terms and procedures under NIMS.

== O ==
- Occupancy: Zoning and safety code term used to determine how a structure is permitted to be used and occupied, which in turn dictates the necessary safety structures and procedures.
- Occupancy class: General categories of structures for purpose of safety planning, such as for hospital, assembly, industrial, single-family dwelling, apartment building, commercial, etc. Further broken down by types of hazards associated with particular occupancies, such as gas stations.
- Occupant use hose: Light-weight 1½" diameter firehose pre-coupled to standpipe for emergency use by building occupants prior to arrival of firefighters. Often accessible by breaking glass to unlock a secure enclosure.
- Offensive attack: Method of firefighting in which water or other extinguishing agent is taken by firefighters, directly to the seat of the fire, as opposed to being pumped in that general direction from a safe distance. Typified by taking hoselines to the interior of a building as opposed to remaining on the outside, a.k.a. "surround and drown."
- On-call: Personnel who can be summoned (and paid) when necessary to respond to an incident; a type of "volunteer" fire department.
- On/off the run: UK term for when an appliance or crew is available, or not available, to respond to incidents. Also known as 'in service' or 'out of service'.
- OSHA: U.S. government agency concerned with regulating employee safety, particularly in hazardous occupations such as firefighting.
- Outside fire: Urban fire not inside a building or vehicle, often found to be burning trash which could extend to nearby structures or vehicles if not dealt with properly. A suburban, interface, or rural outside fire could also be a wildland fire.
- Overhauling: Late stage in fire-suppression process during which the burned area is carefully examined for remaining sources of heat that may re-kindle the fire. Often coincides with salvage operations to prevent further loss to structure or its contents, as well as fire-cause determination and preservation of evidence.
- Over-pressure region: The area in the upper regions of a compartment or structure (above the neutral plane), where the heated smoke layer exerts a positive pressure.
- Oxidizer: A hazardous material containing oxygen (or certain other chemicals, notably fluorine) that can combine with adjacent fuel to start or feed a fire.

== P ==
- Packables: A term used to refer to fire personnel that are certified and trained with SCBA apparatus.
- Packaged: Slang term used to refer to a patient that is ready for transport or attached to a gurney for transport.
- Penciling: The penciling technique is created by adjusting the nozzle to a straight stream pattern and using series of short bursts of water directed at burning materials. This helps reduce the production of flammable gases by cooling the burning walls and ceiling below their ignition point.
- Personal alert safety system: See PASS device in Glossary of firefighting equipment.
- Personnel accountability report ("PAR"): End-result of personnel accountability system. Best report is all hands, A-OK, worse is squad missing. You will often hear command ask for a "PAR" when something has changed on the fire ground. Often the reply will be something like, "Engine 4, PAR." or "Engine 4 has PAR." Some incident command systems specify a PAR for all personnel on the fire ground at specific time intervals during the course of a working fire.
- Personnel accountability system: Tag, "passport," or other system for identification and tracking of personnel at an incident, especially those entering and leaving an IDLH area; intended to permit rapid determination of who may be at risk or lost during sudden changes at the scene.
- Persons reported: A term where persons are confirmed or believed to be in need of rescue from fire.
- Pilot: in mutual aid situations a "pilot" is a member of the local department that rides with a mutual aid engine to ensure proper direct. A pilot is usually picked up at the local station before going to the scene.
- Platoon: a subdivision of a fire company, led by a fire officer of either the rank of captain or lieutenant, such that one of a company's platoons is on duty at any given time. Also called a "watch". In many areas the word "platoon" is used to describe the different shifts in the fire department. For example, A, B or C Platoon.
- Plug: Slang term for a fire hydrant. This survives from the days when water mains actually had holes in the tops that, after usage, were plugged with a tapered wooden plug. Many firefighters would like to keep this word while many others think it should be replaced with the accurate term, "hydrant".
- Positive pressure: Pressure at higher than atmospheric; used in SCBA facepieces and in pressurized stairwells to reduce entry of smoke or fumes through small openings. High volume, portable Positive Pressure Ventilation fans are now carried by fire departments and used to pressurize the fire building during interior attack to control smoke and heat ventilation at desired points.
- Pre-arrival instructions: Directions given by a dispatcher to a caller until emergency units can arrive.
- Pre-fire, pre-incident planning: Information collected by fire prevention officers to assist in identifying hazards and the equipment, supplies, personnel, skills, and procedures needed to deal with a potential incident.
- Pre-planning: Fire protection strategy involving visits to potentially hazardous occupancies for inspection, follow up analysis and recommendations for actions to be taken in case of specific incidents. Not to be confused with post-planning.
- Probie: (also rookie) new firefighter on employment probation (a period of time during which his or her skills are improved, honed, tested, and evaluated).
- Primary search: A search typically done as soon as the ladder truck or special service gets on scene to look for individuals who may be inside the burning structure.
- Primary fire: UK classification for a fire involving property, e.g. buildings or vehicles.
- Professional firefighter: All firefighters are classified as "professionals" by both the International Association of Fire Chiefs (IAFC) and the International Association of Fire Fighters (IAFF trade union). All firefighters are required by most state laws and general practice to meet the same training and equipment standards, take the same examinations for promotion and perform the same work under the same hazards. There are two accepted categories of Professional Firefighters: Volunteer Firefighters who may or may not receive pay for services and Career Firefighters whose primary employment and source of earned income is in the fire service.
- Public alarm: Means for public to report a fire, includes telephone, street-corner pull-boxes, building pull-stations, and manual bells or sirens in rural areas.
- Pumper: A fire truck with a water-pump and a water tank.
- Pump operator, technician: (also a chauffeur): person responsible for operating the pumps on a pumper and typically for driving the pumper to an incident.
- Pump escape: Appliance carrying a wheeled ladder. (mostly obsolete).
- Pump ladder: Appliance carrying a 13.5m ladder, water and pump. (Modern replacement of the Pump Escape).
- Pumper company: Squad or company that mans a fire engine (pumper) and carries out duties involving getting water to the fire.
- Pyrolysis: Process of converting a solid substance to combustible fumes by raising its temperature. See also vaporization of liquids.

== Q ==
- Quick attack: In popular use, the practice of using a pre-connected hand line, pulled from a pumper immediately upon arrival at a fire, and supplied only by tank water, to begin a fire attack in hopes of knocking a fire down quickly, before a supply line and other aspects of the operation are fully in place.
- Quick hit: See "Reset"
- Quarters: Another word to describe the Fire House.

== R ==
- Radiant extension: fire that has transferred ignition heat to adjacent materials across open space. One reason some city fire codes prohibit windows facing each other in adjacent warehouses.
- Rapid entry team: See FAST.
- Rapid intervention crew/group/team (RIC, RIG, or RIT): This is a standby crew whose purpose is to go in for the rescue of firefighters in trouble. While all of these versions of the name for a firefighter rescue crew either have been used or continue to be used in several areas, the National Incident Management System (NIMS) has adopted the term Rapid Intervention Crew/Company, ("RIC") to be the standard in the Incident Command System (ICS). Currently, U.S. federally required training programs, from DHS and FEMA, are in the process of standardizing many terms and procedures under NIMS. See: FAST
- Ready team: A company of firefighters waiting to relieve another company.
- RECEO: RECEOVES stands for rescue, exposures, containment, extinguish, overhaul, ventilation, environment, salvage. This is used at structural fires internationally, as a guide to objectives.
- Recovery: Location and removal of deceased victims. Also, the time needed for a firefighter to spend in rehab before being considered ready to continue working the incident.
- Reflash, re-kindle: A situation in which a fire, thought to be extinguished, resumes burning.
- Reflash watch: A person assigned to observe and monitor an extinguished fire, to ensure that it does not reflash or re-kindle. Aka "Fire Watch."
- Rehab, rehabilitation sector: An area for physical and mental recuperation at a fire scene, usually equipped with beverages, and chairs, isolated from environmental extremes (cold, heat, noise, smoke). This rest area enables firefighters to relax, cool off (or warm up) and regain hydration by way of preventing injury. An EMT may be assigned to monitor firefighter vitals when they enter and leave rehab. See: Fire department rehab
- Rescue: Physical removal of a live person or animal from danger to a place of comfort.
- Rescue company: Squad of firefighters trained and equipped to enter adverse conditions and rescue victims of an incident. Often delegated to a truck company.
- Reset: Used variously, a specific technique to quickly knock down a fire from the exterior of a structure before standard offensive operations are initiated. In the case of an attic fire, an "attic reset" can be performed by creating a very small hole and introducing a Flamefighter or other penetrating fog nozzle and using short bursts of water to knock down the fire and improve conditions before the roof or ceiling is further opened. An "exterior reset" or "quick hit" can be used by introducing a pencil stream through the center of an open window or door, directed at the ceiling, and using a short water application. The pencil stream and center-window technique allows the resulting steam to escape. Done correctly, this can dramatically lower interior temperatures before a crew makes entry.
- Residential sprinkler system: A sprinkler system arranged for fire suppression in a dwelling.
- Residual pressure: When a pumper is taking its water supply from a hydrant the engineer must make sure the pump is not taking every last bit of the pressure the hydrant is able to provide. Some residual pressure must be allowed to remain to provide a buffer so the pump does not accidentally over-draw the hydrant and potentially damage or collapse the water mains leading to the hydrant. It may also refer to the water utility boosting water pressure in the area of a working fire so that "residual pressure" remains in the entirety of the municipal water system despite the water being drawn for fire-fighting.
- Retained firefighter: (U.K. and Ireland) Part-time firefighters who spend long periods of time on call. They receive some pay for being on call and further pay for responding to emergencies. Most retained firefighters are based at fire stations in rural areas or small towns, where there is not enough demand for a wholetime fire station. In larger towns, they may supplement a wholetime crew.
- Reverse lay: The process of stringing hose from a fire toward a source of water, e.g., a fire hydrant.
- Rich: A fuel-air mixture that contains more fuel (unburned smoke) than air. When the right ratio is present, backdraft or flashover can occur.
- Rollover: The ignition of ceiling-level fire gases. Contrast Flashover, above.
- Roof sector (roof group, roof division): A crew, typically a ladder company, assigned to the roof of a structure, most often for purposes of vertical ventilation during a fire. May also be assigned to check roof-mounted equipment, HVAC, etc., for fire or malfunction.
- Run: A callout.
- Run card system: A system of pre-planning for fire protection in which information about specific detectors, hazards, or other emergency response plans is indexed by location, for rapid reference during an alarm.
- Running call: A call, 'Shout', received when an appliance or crew is away from the station.

== S ==
- Safe-Zoning: The objective of 'safe-zoning' is to confine the fire within the compartment/s involved at the outset of operations, prior to removing the dangerous smoke, fire gases and other products of combustion, from the structure. This may be done by simply closing a door/s to the fire compartment/s, followed by subsequent tactical venting actions of non-fire involved compartments using either positive or negative pressure ventilation techniques. This approach should not be allowed to slow any attack on the fire where charged hose-lines are promptly laid in and crewed, inline with a risk assessment that suggests an immediate attack on the fire is a safer option.
- Saint Florian's cross: A common emblem of the fire service, especially in the US. Sometimes referred to as a “Maltese cross”, though this is also the name of a sharp eight-pointed cross. Saint Florian is the patron saint of firefighters.
- SAR: See Search and rescue.
- Salvage: Removing or covering personal property which could be subjected to possible smoke, fire, water or other damage during firefighting, or removal and diverting of smoke and water to prevent further damage. Stopping a broken sprinkler head is one type of salvage operation as is the closing of doors to uninvolved rooms.
- Scene safety: Steps taken at or near an emergency scene to reduce hazards and prevent further injuries to workers, victims or bystanders.
- Scuttle hatch: Ready-made opening in roof that can be opened for vertical ventilation.
- Search and rescue (or SAR): Entering a fire building or collapse zone for an orderly search for victims and removal of live victims. Becomes "recovery" if victims are not likely to be found alive. May be done in quick primary wave and more thorough secondary search.
- Secondary containment: A system to contain a hazardous material should the primary means of containment (container) fail, e.g. by leakage. The secondary container is required to hold 110% of the capacity of the primary container.
- Secondary fire: UK classification for a fire not involving property, e.g. rubbish or grass.
- Sector: A physical or operational division of an incident; an area supervised as a branch in the Incident Command System. A typical system for structure fires names the "front" of the building "sector A", and continues clockwise around the building (B, C, D), with interior sectors denoted by the floor number (1, 2, 3, etc.). A "rehab" sector is one example of an operational division at an incident, where personnel are assigned after strenuous work in another sector.
- SEFU: Abbreviation for a Storm Emergency Fire Unit. Usually a 4-wheeled drive mid-sized (FEMA Class 3) pumper with full fire fighting and dewatering capabilities. Can be used in flooded or snow-bound areas where getting a full-sized truck may be difficult or impossible.
- Shoulder load: The amount of hose a single firefighter can pull off a hose wagon or pumper truck and carry toward the fire.
- Sides A, B, C, and D: Terms used by firefighters labeling the multiple sides of a building starting with side A or Alpha being the front of the structure and working its way around the outside of the structure in a clockwise direction. This labels the front side A or Alpha, the left side B or Bravo, the rear side C or Charlie, and the right side D or Delta.
- Shout: UK slang for a callout.
- Size-up: initial evaluation of an incident, in particular a determination of immediate hazards to responders, other lives and property, and what additional resources may be needed. Example: "Two-story brick taxpayer with heavy smoke showing from rear wooden porches and children reported trapped."
- Skulldrag: To advance a line (hose) manually rather that deploy it from the hose bed of a moving piece of apparatus. Usually applies to supply lines. May be regional terminology (mid-West USA) See Hand jack
- Skid unit: A Skid unit (called a "Slip-on" in Australia) is the common name used to refer to a complete self-contained fire fighting apparatus designed for use on/in commercially available vehicle platforms
- Smoke diving Fire-fighting requiring the use of protective equipment resembling that of marine divers.
- Smoke explosion: See backdraft.
- Smoke-proof stairwell: Building structure which isolates exit stairwells with relatively fire-resistant walls, self-closing doors, and positive pressure ventilation, to prevent smoke or fumes from entering the stairwell during evacuation of occupants from a fire (or other emergency).
- Solid stream: fire stream from round orifice of nozzle. Compare straight stream.
- Squad: specialized truck designed to carry equipment and personnel
- Staging: sector of incident command where responding resources arrive for assignment to another sector. Often an essential element for incident personnel accountability program. May include temporary parking, cover, sanitation, fuel, food and other resources necessary to those apparatus and personnel waiting for immediate assignment.
- Standard operating procedure, guideline (SOP or SOG): Rules for the operation of a fire department, such as how to respond to various types of emergencies, training requirements, use of protective equipment, radio procedures; often include local interpretations of regulations and standards. In general, "procedures" are specific, whereas "guidelines" are less detailed.
- Stand-pipe: see standpipe (firefighting).
- Static pressure: The pressure in a water system when the water is not flowing.
- Station house: Another term for fire station.
- Still alarm: A fire alarm transmitted (as by telephone call) without sounding the signal apparatus.
- Stoichiometric mixture: In terms of flammability limits of gas/air mixtures the stoichiometric mixture is the 'ideal' mixture that will produce a most complete combustion - i.e.; it is somewhere between the UEL (upper) and LEL (lower) explosive limits and an ignition at the stoichiometric point may result in the most severe deflagration, in relation to those near the upper and lower limits of flammability.
- Straight stream: Round, hollow stream formed as water passes a round baffle through a round orifice (e.g., on an adjustable nozzle.) Compare solid stream.
- Stretch: command to lay out (and connect) fire hose and nozzle.
- Strike team: a grouping of similar fire apparatus or personnel with a focused goal in a large fire situation, often commanded by a chief officer. The term is commonly used for structure protection teams during wildland fire operations.
- Structure fire (or "structural fire"): A fire in a residential or commercial building. Urban fire departments are primarily geared toward structural firefighting. The term is often used to distinguish them from wildland fire or other outside fire, and may also refer to the type of training and equipment such as "structure PPE" (personal protective equipment).

== T ==
- Tactical firefighting: The combination of various tactical options on the fireground. These included 3D offensive water-fog; smooth-bore/straight stream (direct) attack; indirect attack; tactical ventilation including "open-up," "close-down" and PPV methods. They key lies in careful risk assessment, recognition of specific conditions, application and training. All these various tactical options have a place on the fireground but the experienced firefighter will recognise specific conditions and utilise the most effective option, or combination of, for each individual scenario, ensuring tactical options are used effectively without conflict or breach of safety.
- Tactical ventilation : Venting actions by on-scene firefighters, used to influence a fire building's internal environment to the advantage of firefighting and rescue teams working within. Such actions may include attempts to release or direct smoke, super-heated, and burning gases from the building by either natural or forced means via vertical or horizontal openings made or existing in the structure. These actions may also include the "closing down" of a structure in an attempt to reduce the flow of air towards the fire. This tactic is termed anti-ventilation by the Swedish Fire Service. It is essential that firefighters remember the most dangerous opening they may create in the structure exists at the point of entry to the building.
- Tailboard: Portion at rear of fire engine where firefighters could stand and ride (now considered overly dangerous), or step up to access hoses in the hose bed.
- Tanker: In use for a long time to refer to a truck designed solely to transport a large quantity of water. In some areas, these trucks are referred to as "tenders" (see "Tender" below) and the term "tanker" is reserved for aircraft equipped to carry water or fire retardant for use in wildland fire suppression.
- Tap out: When morse code was used to communicate within the fire departments – it meant that the fire was extinguished. In modern radio coms "Tap out" can mean to page out or mobilize a Company.
- Taxpayer: 1 to 2 story store, or place of business, usually with a residence attached: auto repair, supermarket, tailor, etc.
- Ten Standard Firefighting Orders: A set of orders designed to be systematically implemented by wildland firefighters to prevent their being trapped by a wildfire.
- Tender (also "water tender"): A wheeled fire apparatus equipped to carry large volumes of water to a fire. Often used in areas without an adequate or universal water supply system, such as rural areas without hydrants. They may carry anywhere from 1,500 to 7,500 US gallons (5,700 to 28,400 litres) of water. Tenders may have pumps and associated hardware to facilitate their mission. Some departments may still refer to these apparatus as "tankers."
- Thermal balance: The degree of thermal balance existing in a closed room during a fire's development is dependent upon fuel supply and air availability as well as other factors. The hot area over the fire (often termed the fire plume or thermal column) causes the circulation that feeds air to the fire. However, when the ceiling and upper parts of the wall linings become super-heated, circulation slows down until the entire room develops a kind of thermal balance with temperatures distributed uniformly horizontally throughout the compartment. In vertical terms the temperatures continuously increase from bottom to top with the greatest concentration of heat at the highest level.
- Thornton's rule (1917) : Each kilogram of oxygen used in the combustion of common organic materials results in release of 13.1 MJ of energy. This rule states that the amount of heat released during the consumption of a given quantity of oxygen is relatively constant for most combustibles. This means that the heat released per unit of oxygen consumed is about the same for wood or plastic. In a ventilation-controlled fire, where the amount of air entering through openings in a room governs the fire, the heat release rate in the room cannot exceed what the available air supply will support.

Air supply may limit the heat release rate in the compartment but that unburned gases (those that could not burn in the room) can burn outside of the compartment. But in the late 1970s, fire researcher C. Huggett at the National Institute of Standards and Technology (NIST) verified Thornton's Rule using the oxygen consumption calorimetry technique, developed at NIST in the early 1970s. In “Estimation of Rate of Heat Release by Means of Oxygen Consumption Measurements,” Huggett shows how much energy was released per gram of oxygen for common combustibles. Where Thornton was only able to estimate the energy release based on the oxidation of carbon-carbon and carbon-hydrogen bonds, Huggett, with modern technology, was able to make actual measurements. Huggett simply verified Thornton's earlier observation, which is the reason it is known today as Thornton's Rule.

- Truck company: a group of firefighters assigned to an apparatus that carries ladders, forcible entry tools, possibly extrication tools and salvage covers along with other tools and equipment, and who are otherwise equipped to perform rescue, ventilation, overhaul and other specific functions at fires or other emergencies; also called "ladder company".
- Truss placard: Exterior pre-plan signage to indicate presence of light-weight truss hazards to firefighters. May indicate floor or roof trusses, or both. Local formats differ. NIOSH standard includes Roman-numeral construction class (i.e., types I-V, from building code; see Type, below), "construction type" (wood, steel, engineered wooden I-joist, truss or concrete), and date of construction or major reconstruction.
- Turnout: The departure of a vehicle and its crew from the station.
- Turnout gear: The protective clothing worn by firefighters.
- Two-in, two-out (or "two in/two out"): Refers to the standard safety tactic of having one team of two firefighters enter a hazardous zone (IDLH), while at least two others stand by outside in case the first two need rescue — thus requiring a minimum of four firefighters on scene prior to starting interior attack. Also refers to the "buddy system" in which firefighters never enter or leave a burning structure alone.
- Type I, II, III, IV, V building - U.S. classification system for fire resistance of building construction types, including definitions for "resistive" Type I, "non-combustible" Type II, "ordinary" Type III, heavy timber Type IV, and "frame construction" Type V (i.e., made entirely of wood).
- Truckie: Person who works on a ladder truck.

== U ==
- Under control: Fire or spill etc. is no longer spreading. The situation is contained. This term should not be confused with a report that the fire is out.
- Underground storage tank: A tank that happens to be underground.
- Under-pressure region: The area in the lower regions of a compartment or structure (below the neutral plane), where ambient air is entering the structure is normally of a lower pressure than the hot and buoyant area above the neutral plane.
- Upper flammable limit (UFL): the greatest concentration of a flammable gas in air that will support ignition and continuous combustion. Limits vary with temperature and pressure, but are normally expressed in terms of volume percentage at 25 °C and atmospheric pressure.
- U.S.A.R: Urban search and rescue.
- United States Fire Administration (USFA): Division of the Federal Emergency Management Agency (FEMA), which in turn is managed by the Department of Homeland Security (DHS).
- Universal precautions: The use of safety barriers (gloves, mask, goggles) to limit an emergency responder's contact with contaminants, especially fluids of injured patients.
- Utility truck: Usually manned by an engine company and responds to utility calls like water main breaks. Some small departments use them to respond to medical calls to save gas money.

== V ==
- Vapor pressure (equilibrium vapor pressure): The pressure of a vapor in thermodynamic equilibrium with its condensed phases in a closed system.
- Vapor suppression: Process of reducing the amount of flammable or other hazardous vapors, from a flammable liquid, mixing with air, typically by careful application of a foam blanket on top of a pool of material.
- Vehicle fire: Type of fire involving motor vehicles themselves, their fuel or cargo; has peculiar issues of rescue, explosion sources, toxic smoke and runoff, and scene safety.
- Vehicle & machinery rescue: Type of special rescue operations that focus on extrication, stabilization, and victim management of vehicles and other machinery. It is usually abbreviated as VMR.
- Ventilation: Important procedure in firefighting in which the hot smoke and gases are removed from inside a structure, either by natural convection or forced, and either through existing openings or new ones provided by firefighters at appropriate locations (e.g., "vertical ventilation" is the classic cut-a-hole-in-the-roof method). Proper ventilation can save lives and improper ventilation can cause backdraft or other hazards.
- Ventilation profile: The ventilation profile refers to the state of ventilation within a fire-involved structure, taking into account the area, number and location of ventilation openings existing at any one time, as well as any forced airflow caused by wind, PPV or other means. The ventilation profile may be tactically altered by firefighters who may increase it or reduce it by creating openings, or closing/reducing openings, either on the exterior or interior of the building.
- Venturi effect: Creating a partial vacuum using a constricted fluid flow, used in fire equipment for mixing chemicals into water streams, or for measuring flow velocity.
- VES: Vent, enter, search - a fireground search method involving entering the building one room at a time through the windows with the goal of locating and rescuing viable victims. VES team searches the given room only and does not venture into the rest of the building.
- VEIS: Vent, enter, isolate, search - a further development of the VES concept, emphasizing the importance of isolating the room being searched from the rest of the building containing the seat of fire, by closing the door as soon as such door is found, in order to improve the tenability and visibility in the room.
- Vertical ventilation: Ventilation technique making use of the principle of convection in which heated gases naturally rise. This is the classic cut-a-hole-in-the-roof method that helps release the smoke and hot gases that accumulate near the ceiling or attic space.
- Voids (building): Enclosed portions of a building where fire can spread undetected.
- Vollie: A volunteer firefighter.
- Volunteer fire department: An organization of part-time firefighters who may or may not be paid for on-call time or firefighting duty time, but who in nearly all states are held to the same professional training standards and take the same examinations to advance in rank as career firefighters. [In some regions, particularly eastern New York, New Jersey, Pennsylvania and Maryland volunteer fire departments and fire protection districts have independent taxing authority and are equally as well equipped and paid while working as career fire department members.]

== W ==
- Watch: (UK) A group of firefighters who work at a station on same shift. Watches are often named with a colour, such as "Red Watch".
- Water drop: A forest fire fighting technique when an airplane (also called an "airtanker") or helicopter drops a supply of water or other fire suppressant onto an exposed fire from above.
- Water hammer: Large, damaging shock wave in a water supply system caused by shutting a valve quickly, or by permitting a vehicle to drive across an unprotected fire hose.
- Well involved: Term of size-up meaning fire, heat and smoke in a structure are so widespread that internal access must wait until fire streams can be applied.
- Wet down ceremony: A traditional ceremony for the placing of new apparatus in service. There are several versions of this but it usually includes: pushing the old apparatus out, wetting down the new vehicle and pushing it back into the station. It may also include the moving of the bell to the new apparatus, photos, etc.
- Wet riser: A pipe in a building filled with water, which hoses can be connected to, so that water can be brought to the floor of a fire.
- Wildfire or wildland fire: Fire in forests, grasslands, prairies, or other natural areas, not involving structure fires (although wildland fires may threaten structures or vice versa - see interface zone.) For a complete list of terms used in wildland fire, see Glossary of wildland fire terms.
- Wholetime firefighter: (U.K. and Ireland) A firefighter who is employed full-time.
- Working fire: A fire that is in the process of being suppressed. Typically reserved for a structure fire or an outside fire with a considerable fire load that requires the incident command system be initiated, additional support and suppression assets dispatched, and necessary notifications made to other municipal agencies. Otherwise known as a "real" fire that will probably not be handled quickly by a single company.
- Woo-woo: A firefighter (typically, but not always a volunteer firefighter) who regularly flaunts the fact they are a firefighter to the people around them.

== Z ==
- Zone: Section of structure indicated on a fire alarm control panel where sensor was activated, which may also have separate HVAC and fire suppression controls. May also refer to the act of zoning a geographic area in which certain types of occupancies are restricted or preferred, due to concerns for fire safety and the availability of fire protection and emergency evacuation routes.

== See also ==
- Glossary of firefighting equipment
- Glossary of wildland fire terms
- List of firefighting mnemonics
