= Multiple-alarm fire =

Fire intensity classification system

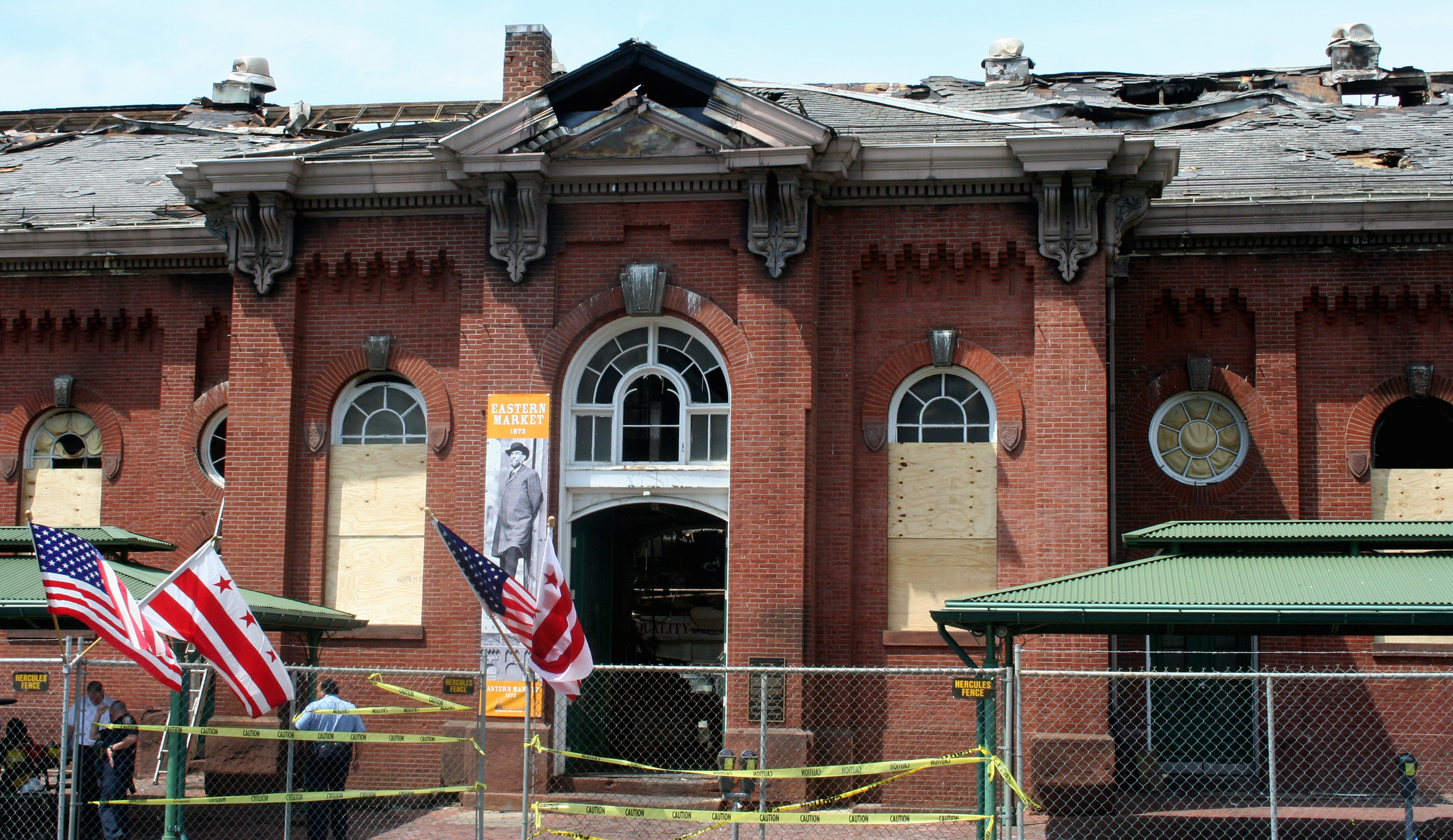
The Eastern Market in Washington, D.C., was damaged by a three-alarm fire in 2007

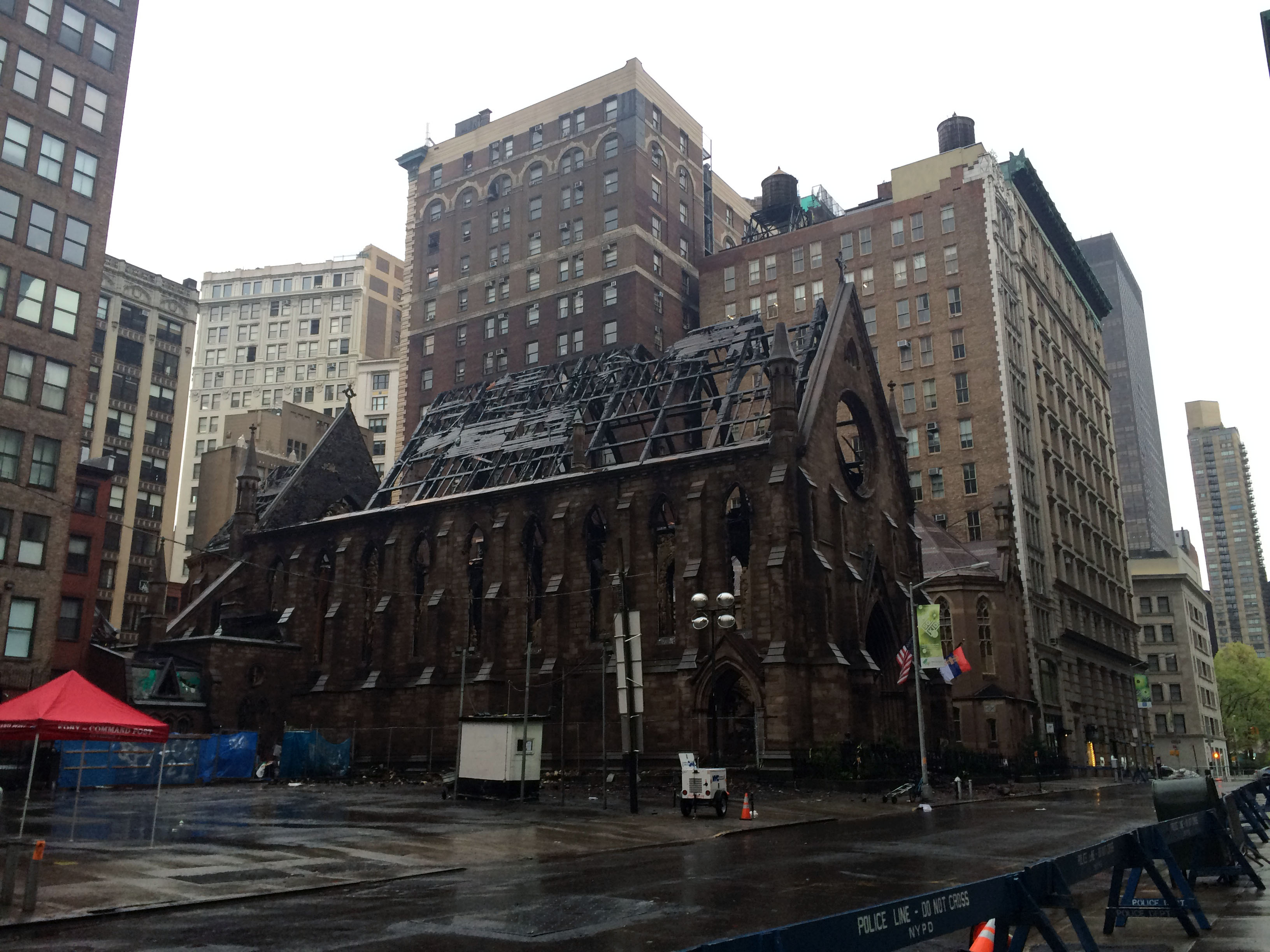
New York City's Serbian Orthodox Cathedral of St. Sava was mostly destroyed by a four-alarm fire in 2016

One-alarm fires, two-alarm fires, three-alarm fires, etc., are categories classifying the seriousness of fires, commonly used in the United States and in Canada, particularly indicating the level of response by local authorities. The term multiple-alarm is a quick way of indicating that a fire is severe and is difficult to contain. This system of classification is used by both fire departments and news agencies.

The most widely used formula for multi-alarm designation is based on the number of units, (for example firetrucks, tankers, rescue vehicles and command vehicles) and firefighters responding to a fire; the more vehicles and firefighters responding, the higher the alarm designation.

In terms of understanding the relative severity of an incident, the government of Rochester, New Hampshire, has reported in a statement that a "typical fire in a small structure will usually require only one or two alarms". In contrast, however, a "large-scale fire in a commercial building would require three alarms or more."

== Definition ==
When identifying the unit/firefighter alarm designation, the initial dispatch is referred to as a "first alarm" and is typically the largest. Subsequent alarms are calls for additional units, usually because the fire has grown and additional resources are needed to combat it, or because the incident is persisting long enough that firefighters on scene need to be relieved.

Requests for units and firefighters from outside jurisdictions do not normally occur in multi-firehouse urban areas until elevated alarms are reached (alarm three and above), but will depend on the location of the incident and the condition of the authority having jurisdiction at the time of the incident.

A common misconception is that a "three-alarm fire", for example, means that three firehouses responded to the fire. This is not the rule behind the naming convention, although some cities may use the number of firehouses responding for multi-alarm designations because that is the simplest way to determine an alarm number.

== Typical alarm levels ==
Alarm levels used in the response policy of the New York City Fire Department (FDNY)
Units assigned	1st-alarm fire / box alarm	1st-alarm fire/ "all hands" box alarm	2nd-alarm fire	3rd-alarm fire	4th-alarm fire	5th-alarm fire
Engine companies	3	5	8	12	16	21
Ladder companies	2	4 (one operating as FAST)	5	7	9	11
Battalion chiefs	1	2 (one as FAST)	5	6		
Squad companies		1				
Rescue companies		1				
Deputy Chief		1				
RAC unit			1			
Satellite units			1			
Safety battalion chief			1			
SOC Battalion chief			1			
Tactical Support Unit			1			
Field Communications Unit			1			
Field Communications Battalion chief			1			
Communications Unit			1			
Mask Service Unit				1		
Air Recon Chief				1		
Mobile Command Unit					1	
Planning Section chief					1	

The list is a basic example of how alarm levels are categorized in a fire department, how many fire apparatus or fire units respond to each alarm level, etc. In New York, however, additional special alarm levels are utilized, aside from the conventional first alarm fire, second alarm fire, third alarm fire, etc. Examples of such alarm levels are the signal 10-75 assignment, the signals 10-76 and 10-77 assignments, and the signal 10-60 assignment. A 10-75 is a working fire (i.e., there is fire visible from a building), the 10-76/10-77 assignments are the alarm levels separate from the first alarm, second alarm, third alarms, etc. that are the standard fire department responses to fires in high-rise buildings. The signal 10-60 is a separate response to major disasters. Engine companies, ladder companies, rescue companies, etc. respond to these disasters. Some units can act as Firefighter Assist and Search Team (FAST) units. Chief units who respond to these incidents include division chief units, deputy chief units, battalion chief units (safety, SOC, field communications), air recon chief units, etc.

The list demonstrates how alarm levels are categorized in order per protocol. Each apparatus count is in an addition on each alarm (a five alarm fire assignment has 21 engine companies total). Each total is the total number of units on scene.

If the incident commander decides that the incident does not require a higher alarm level to be requested, they can specially request an additional unit to the scene without requesting a full alarm level assignment. For example, at a working fire, there are four engine companies, three ladder companies, one squad company, one rescue company, two battalion chief units, and one division chief unit operating at the scene. If the fire is not large enough to require a 2nd alarm, but there is a need for more equipment and manpower, the commanding chief can request additional units to respond "specially called" to the scene.

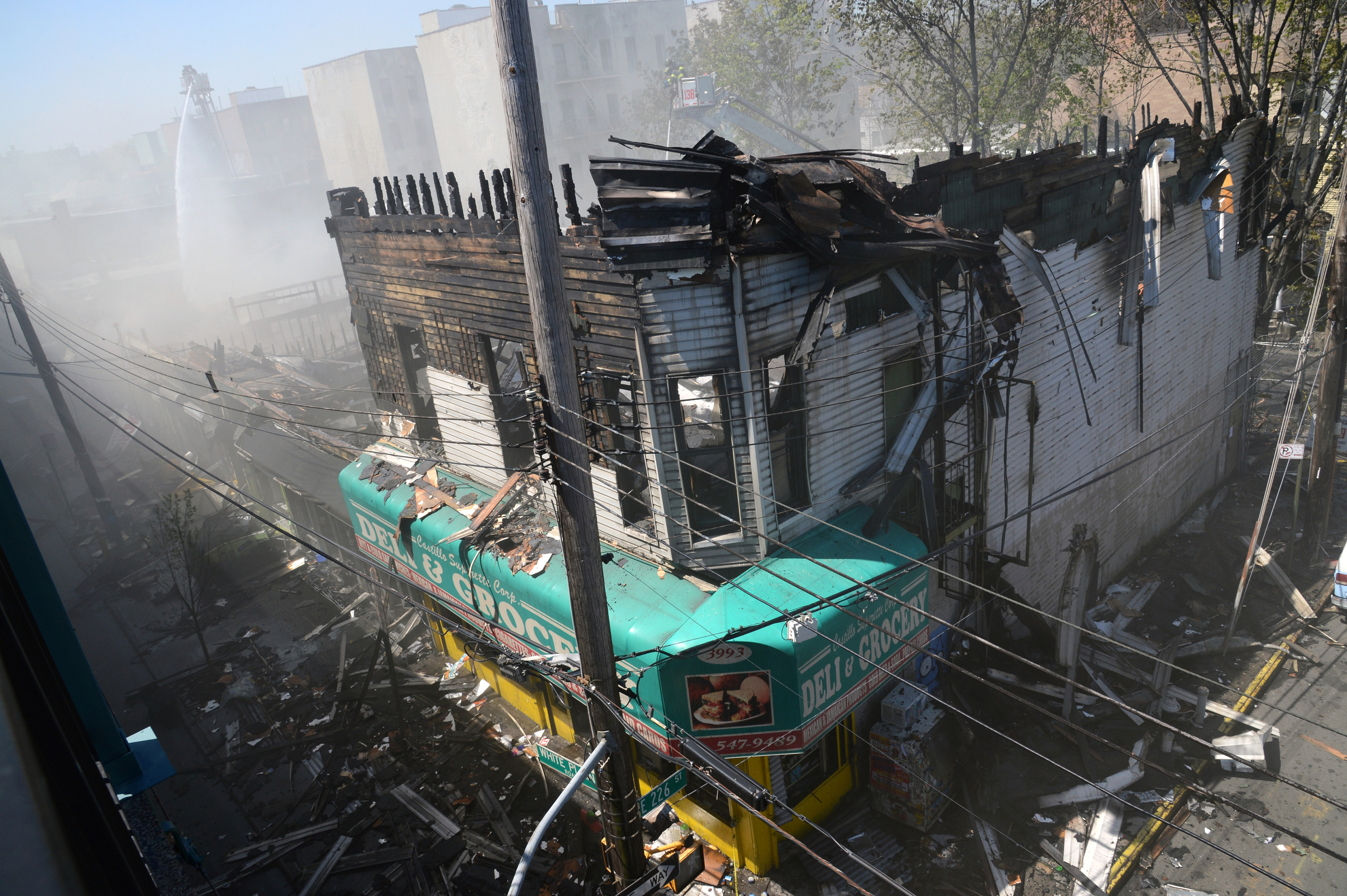
This row of small businesses was destroyed in a five-alarm fire in New York City in 2013

Thus, at the scene of a 5th alarm fire in New York, there are a total of 21 engine companies, 11 ladder companies, one squad company, one rescue company, six battalion chief units, one division chief unit, one deputy chief unit, one assistant chief unit, and the chief of operations, as well as multiple specialized units and or specially called units operating on the scene.

All of these companies come from many firehouses to the scene. Some companies, however, are quartered together at the same firehouse. So, it is not a matter of how many firehouses respond to a fire as popularly believed, but rather how many companies/units and how many firefighters are operating on scene.

== History ==
The system of classification comes from the old tradition of using pull stations to alert the local departments to a fire in their area. When initially pulled, a pull box will pulse its identification number multiple times to a receiving reel-to-reel telegraph unit (typically located in the nearest dispatch office). Within the pull box, a firefighter is able to (via a built-in telegraph key) manually key back to dispatch, including requests for mutual aid. One such code commonly used throughout the US was four rings, a pause, and another four rings (known to fire alarm specialists as "Code 4-4" or simply "4-4") to indicate a particularly intense fire, giving rise to the phrase "four alarm fire".
