= Company officer =

Company officer may refer to:

- Company officer (firefighter)
- Company-grade officer, in United States military usage, a Second Lieutenant, First Lieutenant, or Captain
- Corporate officer, of a business
