= FAST Team =

FAST Team may refer to:

- Firefighter Assist and Search Team
- Fleet Antiterrorism Security Team, an elite branch of the U.S. Marine Corps
- Drug Enforcement Administration#Foreign-deployed Advisory and Support Teams
