= Overall (disambiguation) =

An overall is a type of garment which is usually used as protective clothing when working.

Overall may also refer to:

== Clothing ==
- Boilersuit, a garment also known as an overall or overalls
- high-waisted, tightly cut trousers of mess uniforms worn by British Army officers

== Places ==
- Overall, Tennessee, an unincorporated community
- Overall, Virginia, an unincorporated community in Warren County, Virginia
- Overall Creek, a Tennessee tributary of the West Fork of the Stones River

== Other uses ==
- Overall (surname)
- Overall deal, where a network has the rights to all the output of a production company

== See also ==
- Overall length
- Length overall, where overall is sometimes abbreviated as o/a, o.a. or oa
- Dressing overall
- Overhall Grove
- Overhaul (disambiguation)
- Øvrevoll
