= Overhaul =

Overhaul may refer to:

- The process of overhauling, see
  - Maintenance, repair, and overhaul
  - Refueling and overhaul (e.g. nuclear-powered ships)
  - Time between overhauls
- Overhaul (firefighting), the process of searching for hidden fire extension on a fire scene
- Overhaul (My Hero Academia), a character in the manga series My Hero Academia

== See also ==
- Overall (disambiguation)
- Overhaulin', a TV show
