= Mattydale =

Mattydale may refer to:

- Mattydale, New York, a hamlet (and census-designated place) in Onondaga County, New York, United States
- Mattydale lay, the first "cross lay", a way of storing hose on a fire engine popular in the United States
