= Death of Loretta Pickard =

2018 death in Lakeland, Florida

Loretta Pickard
- Pickard prior to her death
- Born: November 28, 1941
- Died: November 23, 2018 (aged 76); Lakeland, Florida, U.S.
- Cause of death: Immolation and smoke inhalation
- Known for: Death following house fire and failures in emergency responses

On November 23, 2018, Loretta Pickard, a 76-year-old woman from Lakeland, Florida, U.S., died after a fire commenced in her home. While she was in her house, she placed a 911 call reporting her house was on fire and providing information for responders to find her. Officers and firefighters were dispatched to the scene, but they failed to make attempts to rescue her. Her death was ruled as immolation and smoke inhalation, and a $200,000 settlement was approved for Pickard's family.

== Background ==
Loretta Pickard was born on November 28, 1941, and had a sister and husband. As of 2018, she lived in Lakeland, Florida, U.S., and was recovering from a hip surgery prior to her death.

== Death ==
In the evening of November 23, 2018, Pickard was home alone when her house appeared to be smoking from an undisclosed source. While inside the smoking house, Pickard placed a call to 911. She described the situation she was in, reporting her house was burning and was unable to escape. During the call, she said, "I think my house is on fire... They know i'm here, right?... Tell them to hurry." The call went on for about 20 minutes, and the dispatcher assured her help was arriving.

As time went on, the fire rapidly spread and most of her house was burning. About 14 minutes after the call started, responders and multiple firefighters were dispatched to the scene. The radio call from the fire department shows that the commander, known as James Williams, was notified by the dispatcher, "We were advised there's somebody inside the structure," around the first minute of response, however attemps to rescue her had not been made. Allegedly, the first responders tried to rescue Pickard, but claimed the fire was too hot.

In the last few seconds of the 20-minute call, Pickard remarked, "I'm on fire!" and went silent. The dispatcher asked if she was still there, while sounds of what appeared to be wood and other material collapsing were heard. A policy was claimed to be broken, known as the two-in, two-out policy, in which two workers must enter the building together, while two others must remain outside. This was never communicated at the scene.

== Investigation and aftermath ==
It was determined that Pickard died from immolation, and smoke inhalation. It was discovered that commander Williams, who was reportedly calling shots on the scene, had recorded a Snapchat video outside of the actively burning house, which was considered a policy violation. Williams was suspended for 24 hours without pay.

In late March 2019, Pickard's husband, James, filed a notice of the intent to sue Polk County and Polk County Sherriff office. The notice received said that a operator with the sheriff's office failed instruction and communication, resulting in Pickard's death. James' lawyer assured him 'it won't happen again'.

In July 2019, Polk County commissioners unanimously approved a $200,000 settlement to Pickard's family estate, being the maximum liability that government agency faces under Florida law.
