= Hose pack =

Backpack

A hosepack is a backpack containing fire hose in a preconfigured arrangement, sometimes completely made from fire hose without a bag, which is used to quickly facilitate the construction of a hose lay. In the context of wildland fire fighting, hosepacks are widely used in areas where fire trucks are unable to access.

Wildland hosepacks include; the Gansner pack, Travis pack, Lake George pack and Gnass pack. These types of hose packs are considered progressive hose packs. When deployed they always have laterals off the trunk line that allow water to be used at any point in the progression of the hose lay.

In structure fire fighting the main type of hose pack is the high-rise pack. It is used in conjunction with standpipes in high rise buildings to quickly deploy hose on multistory buildings.

Various devices, commonly referred to as fire hose vacuums or "hose vacs", are becoming more prevalent that make packing hose easier as well as facilitating the removal of air, which makes the packs smaller and easier to deploy.
