= Glossary of wildfire terms =

This glossary of wildfire terms is a list of definitions of terms and concepts relevant to wildfires and wildland firefighting. Except where noted, terms have largely been sourced from a 1998 Fireline Handbook transcribed for a Conflict 21 counter-terrorism studies website by the Air National Guard.

For related terminology, see Glossary of firefighting terms and Glossary of firefighting equipment.

== 0–9 ==
1 hr, 10 hr, 100 hr, 1000 hr fuels
Refers to the time-lag classes of dead fuels as classified by size: 1 hr = 0 to 0.25-inch diameter, 10 hr = 0.25- to 1-inch diameter, 100 hr = 1- to 3-inch diameter, 1000 hr = 3- to 8-inch diameter

== A ==
aerial canopy
A fuel type consisting of trees having few low branches, which makes them less susceptible to ignition by low-intensity fires.
aerial firefighting

The use of aircraft in support of ground resources to combat wildfires, often most effective in initial attack in light fuels.
air drop
The delivery of supplies or fire retardant from the air. Supplies can be dropped by parachute, while retardant is generally released in a single drop of one or more trails, the size of which is determined by the wind and the volume, speed and altitude of the airtanker (usually no less than 200 feet above the drop zone).
air operations
A group tasked with coordinating aerial-based observation, supply, rescue and suppression at the scene of a wildfire.
air tactical group supervisor
A person who coordinates air resources for attack of a fire with aerial firefighting.
airtanker
A fixed-wing aircraft certified by the FAA as being capable of transporting and delivering 600 to 3,000 gallons of water or other liquid or powder fire retardants. Formerly referred to as borate bombers before borate-based retardants became less desirable. Often accompanied by a spotter plane.
anchor point
An advantageous location, usually a barrier to fire spread, from which to start constructing a fireline. The anchor point is used to minimize the chance of being flanked (or outflanked) by the fire while the line is being constructed.

== B ==
backburn
A precautionary fire set downwind of the main fire for controlled fuel clearing by "backing" it into the main fire, similar to a burnout, which occurs adjacent to the control line.
backfire
A fire set along the inner edge of a fireline to consume the fuel in the path of a wildfire and to change the direction or force of the fire’s convection column.
Bambi bucket
A collapsible bucket used for lifting and moving water or fire retardant with a helicopter.
barrier
Any obstruction to the spread of fire. Typically an area or strip devoid of combustible fuel.
base
1. A staging or command center for fire operations.
2. The starting location of a fire.
3. A base camp location used by firefighters for eating, sleeping, etc., typically near the staging or command center.
berm
Soil heaped on the downhill side of a traversing fireline below a fire in order to trap rolling firebrands.
blackline
A condition in which no combustible fuels remain between the fireline and the main fire.
blowup
A sudden increase in fireline intensity or the rate of spread of a fire sufficient to preclude direct control or to upset existing suppression plans. Often accompanied by violent convection and may have other characteristics of a firestorm.
Boise Interagency Fire Center (BIFC)
The former name for the National Interagency Fire Center.
bone yard
An area scraped to mineral soil for the safe handling of smoldering materials; also, a systematic mop-up of smoldering materials by scraping off embers and placing materials into the bone yard area.
booster hose, booster reel, booster pump
A small solid hose on a reel connected to a small pump fitted to a water tank on a vehicle. Booster pump also refers to a pump in a relay series for pumping uphill beyond the lift of the previous pump.
brush blade
A rake attachment used for cutting or ripping brush and roots out of a fireline.
brush hook
A type of cutting tool used to clear brush, usually with a heavy, solid, curved blade that is longer than a machete bolted to the end of an arm's-length handle.
brush truck

A small fire truck outfitted for wildland firefighting.
bump up
To move to another location. Can be used in many contexts, from moving to another location on a single fireline to an entire crew moving to another fire. Bump back means to return to a previous location. In the "bump" system of fireline construction, each firefighter works on a small piece of fireline with their tool until a completed portion of line is encountered. Then the call to bump up is heard, and everyone ahead of the caller skips ahead one or more positions, leaving the unfinished fireline for those coming up behind.
burning index
A relative measure of fire-control difficulty; doubling the index means twice the effort may be needed to control the fire.
burn out
Setting fire inside a control line to consume fuel between the edge of the fire and the control line.
burning period
The part of each 24-hour period when fires spread most rapidly, typically from 10:00 a.m. to sundown.
bushfire
The local name for a wildfire that occurs in the forests, scrubs, woodlands or grasslands of Australia or New Zealand.

== C ==
candle
A standing tree with a broken top which often continues to burn after the main firefront has passed. Candles usually send up a fountain of sparks and burning embers which may travel some distance and be of concern if near the unburnt side of a control line.
closed area
An area in which specified activities or entry are temporarily restricted to reduce the risk of human-caused fires.
closure
Legal restriction of specified activities such as smoking, camping, vehicle access, or entry in general which might cause or contribute to fires in a given area.
cold trailing
A method of controlling a partly dead fire edge by carefully inspecting and feeling with the hand for heat to detect any fire, and lining any live edge.
complex
Two or more individual wildfire incidents located in the same general area which are assigned to a single incident commander or unified command.
confine a fire
To keep a fire within established boundaries of constructed firelines under prevailing conditions. The least aggressive wildfire suppression strategy.
contain a fire
To keep a fire within established boundaries of constructed firelines under prevailing conditions. A moderately aggressive wildfire suppression strategy.
control line
An inclusive term for all constructed or natural barriers and retardant-treated fire edges used to control a fire.
controlled burn
See prescribed burn.
coyote tactics
A progressive line construction duty involving primarily hotshots and jumpers who build firelines until the end of the operation and then bed down wherever they end up, often without tents or sleeping bags.
creeping fire
A fire that spreads slowly and burns with a low flame.
crown fire
A fire that advances between the tops of trees or shrubs more or less independently of a fire on the ground surface. Crown fires are sometimes classed as running or dependent to distinguish the degree of independence from the surface fire.
crown out
See torching.

== D ==
dead man zone
The unburnt areas around the edges of a brush fire.
dead out
The state of a fire being completely out, with no smoldering or burning areas. Contrast contained.
demob
A crew being removed from working a fire. An abbreviation of demobilization.
direct attack
Any treatment applied directly to burning fuel, such as wetting, smothering, or chemically quenching the fire or by physically separating the burning from the unburned fuel.
dozer line

A fireline constructed with the front blade of a bulldozer or any tracked vehicle with a front-mounted blade used for exposing mineral soil.
drafting
The act of using a suction pump to lift water from below the pump, using a semi-rigid suction hose, typically to fill a portable reservoir that has other suction pumps (to relay) or siphon hoses running downhill to their nozzles.
drip torch
A hand-carried fire-starting device filled with flammable liquid that is poured across a flaming wick, dropping flaming liquid onto the fuels to be burned.
duff
A layer of decaying forest litter consisting of organics such as needles, leaves, and other plant materials covering the mineral soil. Duff can smolder for days after a fire. Extinguishing smoldering duff is key to successful mop-up operations.

== E ==
engine
Any ground vehicle providing specified levels of pumping, water, and hose capacity but with less than the specified level of personnel.
engine crew
A number of personnel trained to respond to incidents using an engine. Typically much smaller than a hand crew.
escape fire
A fire intentionally ignited by a fire crew, usually in a grassland environment, in order to escape a dangerous situation.
escaped fire
A fire which has exceeded or is expected to exceed initial attack capabilities or prescriptions.
extended attack
A situation in which a fire cannot be controlled by initial attack resources within a reasonable period of time. Committing additional resources within 24 hours after commencing suppression action will usually control the fire.

== F ==
fire behavior
The manner in which a fire reacts to the influences of fuel, weather, and topography.
fire blindness
Failure to recognize the prominent ecological and evolutionary role of fire in fire-prone ecosystems.
fire camp
A temporary camp established near the scene of large fires to provide food, rest, and other necessities to fire crews.
fire cycle
fire danger
fire ecology
A scientific branch of ecology concerned with the interactions between abiotic and biotic components of ecosystems, the role of fire as an ecosystem process, and the effects of fire on vegetation, plant communities, soils, wildlife, and landscapes.
fire edge
The boundary between burned or actively burning areas of a fire and unburned areas at a given moment.
firefighting foam
An aerated solution created by forcing air into, or entraining air within, water containing a foam concentrate by means of suitably designed equipment or by cascading it through the air at a high velocity. Foam reduces combustion by cooling, moistening and excluding oxygen.
fire lookout tower
A structure located at a high vantage point to house and protect the person or crew performing the duties of a fire lookout.
fire lookout
A person or crew that actively observes the surroundings for possible fire starts and conditions. They often rely on an elevated fire lookout tower to provide them with a clear vantage over nearby terrain. The duty may be performed as a prophylactic measure prior to any fire or as a means of assisting a fire crew on an existing fireline.
fire rake
A type of rake with sharpened teeth instead of blades, used for raking a firebreak.
fire retardant
Any substance (except plain water) that by chemical or physical action reduces the flammability of fuels or slows their rate of combustion. Examples include retardant slurry, AFFF, and firefighting foam, among others.
fire risk
fire shelter
A portable aluminized tent offering protection by means of reflecting radiant heat and providing a volume of breathable air in a fire entrapment situation. Carried as a safety tool, fire shelters are only used in life-threatening situations as a last resort, as severe burns and asphyxiation often result.
fire shirt
A type of distinctive yellow shirt made of Nomex or other lightweight materials of low combustibility, used as uniform PPE by wildland firefighters, and more recently available in other colors.
fire trail
The Australian name for a fireroad; a road built specifically for access for fire management purposes.
fire weather
Any weather conditions that affect fire vulnerability, fire behavior and suppression.
fire whirl
A tornado-like vortex of air that forms from the stretching of vorticity due to the interaction of air flowing towards and upwards in a very large wildfire.
fire-return interval
Fireline handbook
A small red booklet carried by U.S. firefighters on the firelines as a quick reference on various firefighting topics.
fireline

The part of a control line that is scraped or dug to mineral soil. More generally, working a fire is called being on the fireline. May also refer to a wet line, where water has been used to create a burn boundary in light fuels such as grass.
firestorm
A type of extreme fire behavior indicated by widespread in-drafts and a tall column of smoke and flame, where added air increases fire intensity, creating runaway fire growth.
firebreak
Any natural or constructed barrier used to stop or check fires that may occur, or to provide a control line from which to work.
flanks of a fire
The parts of a fire’s spread perimeter that grow to the sides then run roughly parallel to the main direction of spread. Separated flank heads are extremely dangerous in steep terrain.
flare-up
Any sudden acceleration in the rate of spread or intensification of a fire. Unlike a blowup, a flare-up is of relatively short duration and does not radically change existing control plans.
flash fuels
Fuels such as grass, leaves, draped pine needles, fern, tree moss and some kinds of slash which ignite readily and are consumed rapidly when dry. Contrast heavy fuels.
fuel load
The mass of combustible materials available for a fire usually expressed as the weight of the fuel per unit area (e.g. 20 tons per acre).
fuel moisture
The percentage water content of vegetation that is potential fuel for a fire, an important factor in rate of spread, ranging from dead-fuel and fine-fuel moisture (FFM) of 10 percent or less to live-fuel moisture (LFM) of 60 percent or more. FFM can be estimated by weighing calibrated wood sticks.
fuel type
An identifiable association of fuel elements of distinctive species, form, size, arrangement, or other characteristics that will cause a predictable rate of spread or resistance to control under specified weather conditions.
fuelbreak
A natural or artificial change in fuel characteristics which affects fire behavior so that fires burning into it can be more readily controlled.

== G ==
ground fire
A fire that consumes the organic material beneath the surface litter ground, such as a peat fire.

== H ==
hand crew
A number of individuals that have been organized and trained and are supervised principally for operational assignments on an incident, typically using handheld tools. In the United States, an ordinary hand crew is 20 in number, including supervisors.
hazard reduction
The act of intentionally igniting controlled and managed fires during cooler and wetter weather as precautionary measures in order to reduce the available fuel load for unintentional fires. Sometimes incorrectly called a backburn.
head of a fire
The most rapidly spreading portion of a fire’s perimeter, usually to the leeward or up a slope; may have multiple heads if there are separated flanking fires.
heavy fuels
Fuels of large diameter such as snags, logs, and large-limbed wood, which ignite and are consumed more slowly than flash fuels.
helispot
A natural or improved takeoff and landing area intended for temporary or occasional helicopter use, typically in remote areas without other access.
helitack
A fire crew trained to use helicopters for initial attack and to support large fires through bucket drops and the movement of personnel, equipment and supplies. Another primary function of Helitack is jumper support and retrieval.
hose pack
A general term covering all types of hose configurations a firefighter might carry to deploy.
hose vacuum
A small pneumatic vacuum generator that removes air from the inside of a fire hose, making it firm, more compact, and therefore easier to pack.
hot spot
A particularly active part of a fire.
hotshot crew

An intensively trained fire crew used primarily in hand line construction and organized primarily to travel long distances from fire to fire as needed rather than serving only one location.

== I ==
Incident Command System (ICS)
A fire operations management system first developed to provide a command structure to manage large wildfires in the United States and now widely used by many emergency management agencies.
Incident Qualification Card

Credentials issued to qualified firefighters listing their qualifications and specialties. These certifications must be renewed annually.
Indian pump

A type of portable water vessel carried on one's back, either a rigid can or collapsible bag, with a hose and telescoping squirt pump. Typically contains five U.S. gallons and is used on hot spots and during mop-up. Of uncertain utility in active crown fires.
indirect attack
A method of suppression in which the control line is located some considerable distance away from the fire’s active edge. This method is generally used in the case of a fast-spreading or high-intensity fire and to utilize natural or constructed firebreaks, fuel breaks, and favorable breaks in the topography. The intervening fuel is usually backfired, but occasionally the main fire is allowed to burn to the line, depending on conditions. Contrast direct attack.
infrared (IR) detector
A heat detection system used for fire detection, mapping, and hot spot identification.
initial attack
The actions taken by the first resources to arrive at a wildfire to protect lives and property and to prevent further expansion of the fire. Usually done by trained and experienced crews, and taking place immediately after size-up.
interface zone
Where urban firefighting meets wildland firefighting. Structures at the edges of wildlands are uniquely threatened, and protecting them from fires requires skills and equipment of both disciplines.
into the black
Moving from outside the fire front to inside the burned area, which is sometimes the safest place to be in a flare-up.

== J ==
jumper
See smokejumper.

== K ==
knock down
To reduce the flame or heat on the more vigorously burning parts of a fire edge, usually by cooling with dirt, water or other retardant.

== L ==
LACES
A firefighter safety mnemonic for lookout, awareness or anchor point, communications, escape routes, safety zones.
ladder fuels

Flammable vegetation that helps a ground fire spread vertically into the canopy.
lead plane
An aircraft with pilot used to make trial runs over a target area to check wind, smoke conditions, topography and to lead airtankers to targets and supervise their drops.
let-burn policy
An administrative decision to defer fire suppression, perhaps because of wilderness and long-term forest conservation considerations.
line firing
An activity related to burn out along a fireline using drip torches, fusees, or other flammable materials.
litter
A buildup of leaves and twigs on the ground surface.
logging slash

Tops, stumps, mill ends, or limbs left by logging operations. May be beneficial to soil stability, but can dry out and create heavy fuel load hazards.
longline
A helicopter arrangement for lowering external loads (or removing loads) into areas not available for landing, using a long cable suspended from a hard point on the belly of the aircraft.
lookouts
1. Safety personnel positioned to monitor the location and behavior of a fire, ready to signal a crew to escape.
2. Fire lookout towers or fire towers, often on mountain-tops, for viewing the surrounding countryside and watching for signs of fire.
3. Fire lookouts, the people who work in fire lookout towers.
4. The "L" in the LACES firefighter safety mnemonic.

== M ==
McLeod
A hand tool consisting of a combination rake and hoe, often used in fireline construction.
mop-up
The act of extinguishing or removing burning material near control lines, felling snags, and trenching logs to prevent rolling after an area has burned in order to make a recent fire zone safe or to reduce residual smoke.
mutual aid
Cross-jurisdictional assistance with emergency services by pre-arranged agreement.

== N ==
National Fire Danger Rating System (NFDRS)
A system used in the United States to provide a measure of the relative seriousness of burning conditions and threat of fire.
National Fire Protection Association (NFPA)
The U.S. national fire and safety standards organization, responsible for issuing various wildfire-oriented standards related to clothing, tactics, equipment, etc.
National Hose (NH)
National Standard Thread (NST) design of threaded couplings used on fire hose in various diameters; incompatible with many types of wildfire hose threads, thus requiring adapters.
National Interagency Fire Center (NIFC)
The U.S. national fire operations coordination facility, located in Boise, Idaho and operated by several U.S. agencies to provide logistics, weather information and resource coordination for wildfire suppression across the country (formerly known as the Boise Interagency Fire Center).
National Wildfire Coordinating Group
A coordination agency located in Washington, D.C. which sets national standards for wildland firefighter training and publishes training manuals.
Nomex
A brand of approved, synthetic, fire-retardant aramid cloth and thread widely used in personal protective equipment for wildland firefighting and jumpsuits.

== O ==
one-hour fuel
Vegetation with large surface-to-mass ratio, a so-called fine fuel (along with 10-hour) that quickly reaches critical (flammable) moisture levels (fine fuel moisture, FFM) when exposed to heat; compare with 100-hour or 1000-hour fuels (i.e., live fuel moisture, LFM), which take much more heat to ignite.
overhead
Personnel assigned to supervisory positions, including incident commander, command staff, general staff, branch directors, supervisors, unit leaders, managers, and staff. Also may be organized according to qualifications and experience, as type I overhead team, and the like. Many positions, functions and interactions of wildfire overhead organizations provided the model for modern Incident Command Systems in the United States.

== P ==
Palmer drought severity index (PDI)
An index that measures the impact of soil moisture changes on vegetation in order to help predict fire danger and fire behavior.
parallel attack
A fire containment method where crews construct a fireline at some distance from the edge of the fire (e.g., 100 yards) and then burn out the fuel in the buffer as the fireline is completed.
perennial grasses
An extremely volatile fuel, after curing, in May, June, and July, which can lead to large, fast fires that may reach larger fuels.
point of origin
An element of fire behavior indicating where a fire began, which may be used to support further analysis of where the fire went and/or will go. Evidence of specific origin is often obscured or destroyed by suppression tactics.
prescribed burn

A fire that is deliberately ignited for the purpose of forest or prairie management, often to remove heavy fuel buildup or simulate natural cycles of fire in an ecosystem.
progressive hose lay
A method of deploying hoses along firelines during suppression and as they are built and reinforced, typically using 1½-inch supply lines, gated wyes and 1-inch lateral lines with nozzles (or spigot valves) every 100 feet or so. As the line progresses, more hoses and valves are added.
project fire
Any large fire requiring extensive management and the establishment of a temporary infrastructure to support firefighting efforts, such as fire camps.
Pulaski

A combination axe and grub hoe tool with a straight handle, used for building handlines.

pumpkin
A frameless, self-supporting, 6000-gallon portable reservoir used for long- or short-term water storage. Can be used to fill helicopter buckets or as a water supply for ground crew.

== R ==
rappeller
A crew of specialist firefighters who are trained to access a fire area by sliding down ropes suspended from a hovering helicopter.
reburn
1. A repeat burning of an area over which a fire has previously passed, but left fuel that later ignites when burning conditions are more favorable.
2. An area that has burned again following a previous burn.
Red Card
See Incident Qualification Card.
red-flag day
A type of warning used to alert people that weather conditions are favorable for creating a critical fire hazard and that closures of susceptible areas to non-emergency activities may be required in order to minimize the risk of accidental wildland fires.
roll
A 14-day work schedule on a wildfire or wildfires. Shifts of 16-24 hours per day are possible. Rolls can be bookended by up to 3 days of travel on either side. Rolls can also be extended beyond 14 days.

== S ==
S-130/S-190
The basic wildland fire training course given to all U.S. firefighters before they can work on the fire lines.
safety zone
An area cleared of flammable material used for escape in the event the line is outflanked or in case a spot fire causes fuels outside the control line to render the line unsafe. In firing operations, crews progress so as to maintain a safety zone close at hand allowing the fuels inside the control line to be consumed before going ahead. Safety zones may also be constructed as integral parts of fuel breaks; they are greatly enlarged areas which can be used with relative safety by firefighters and their equipment in the event of blowup in the vicinity.
sawyer
A chainsaw crew, may also include fallers or fellers who are qualified to cut down trees or snags, perhaps while the tree or snag is burning.
SEAT
An acronym of "single engine airtanker"; a small agricultural aircraft converted for use on fires, predominantly during the initial attack phase.
secondary line
Any fireline constructed at a distance from the fire perimeter concurrently with or after a line already constructed on or near to the perimeter of the fire. Generally constructed as an insurance measure in case the fire escapes control by the primary line.
size-up
Initial assessment of fire including fuel load, weather, topography, fire behavior, hazards and exposures of valuable properties. Quickly detects needs for additional resources and sets operational priorities.
skidder unit
Pre-configured tank, pump, hose for attachment to a logging skidder (large four-wheel-drive tractor with a dozer blade, winch or grapple) to be carried to a fireline.
slash
Debris resulting from such natural events as wind, fire, or snow breakage; or such human activities as road construction, logging, pruning, thinning, or brush cutting. It includes logs, chunks, bark, branches, stumps, and broken understory trees or brush. See also logging slash.
sling load
Cargo net containing supplies or equipment delivered by longline below a helicopter.
slopover
Fire spreading outside the boundaries of a control line.
slug
A humorous pejorative term for a member of a fire crew believed not to be doing their share of the work.
slurry bomber
See airtanker.
smokechaser
A colloquial term for a wildland firefighter. Now mostly archaic, except in Minnesota where state Department of Natural Resources firefighters are officially known by that name.
smokejumper
A specifically trained and certified firefighter who travels to remote wildfires by fixed-wing aircraft and parachutes into a jump spot, which may include trees, close to the fire.
snag
Any dead standing tree that may be in danger of falling or collapsing.
spike camp
A remote camp usually near a fireline and lacking the logistical support that a larger fire camp would have.
spotting
Behavior of a fire producing sparks or embers that are carried by the wind and which start new fires (spot fires) beyond the zone of direct ignition by the main fire. A cascade of spot fires can cause a blowup.
strike team
A specified combination of the same kind and type of resources, with communications and a leader.
suppression
All of the work of extinguishing or confining a fire, beginning with its discovery.
suppression crew

Two or more firefighters stationed at a strategic location for initial action on fires. Duties are essentially the same as those of individual firefighters; often organized into 20-person crews, including supervisors, for simplified logistics and operations.
surface fire
A fire that burns loose debris on the ground surface, which may include dead branches, blowdown timber, leaves, and low vegetation. Contrast crown fire.

== T ==
task force
Any combination of resources assembled for a particular tactical need, with common communications and a leader. A task force may be pre-established and sent to an incident, or formed at an incident.
torching
Not to be confused with crowning; when a single or small group of trees go up in flames. Torching and group torching are more of a nuisance whereas crown fire is of much greater concern.
tree jump
The act of a smokejumper parachuting into a tree canopy if a clearing is not available or suitable.
turn around
A widened part of a fire break used for turning vehicles around, also used as a safe area during entrapment.
Type I engine
A fire engine designed primarily for fighting fires in structures accessible from roads.
Type II engine

A fire engine designed to carry and pump water for use in fire suppression.
Type III engine
A fire engine designed primarily for fighting wildland fires. These engines are usually able to traverse more rugged terrain than type I and type II engines.

== U ==
understory burn
A controlled burn of fuels below the forest canopy, intended to remove fuels from oncoming or potential fires.
urban interface
The interface zone where man-made structures inter-mingle with wildlands, creating the risk of structural involvement in a wildland fire incident and wildland fire involvement in structure fires, each of which requires different equipment, training, and tactics.

== W ==
watch out situations
A list of 18 situations for firefighters to be aware of, which signal potential hazards on the fire line; originated from analysis of generations of similar incidents.
water tender
Any ground vehicle capable of transporting specified quantities of water.
wet line
A type of temporary control line using water or other fire-retardant liquid to prevent a low-intensity fire from spreading in surface fuels or to knock down a more intense fire.
widowmaker
Any branch or treetop that is poorly or no longer attached to a tree, but still tangled overhead.
wildfire
An unplanned, unwanted wildland fire, including unauthorized human-caused fires, escaped wildland fire use events, escaped prescribed fire projects, fires caused by lightning strikes or downed power lines, and all other wildland fires where the objective is to put the fire out.
wildland
An area in which manmade development is essentially nonexistent, except possibly for roads, railroads, power lines, and similar transportation facilities. Structures, if any, are usually remote and widely scattered.
wildland fire engine
A fire apparatus specialized for accessing wildland fires with water, equipment and small crew. Size and agility of these units may also be useful for other urban missions.
wildland fire use fire (WFU fire)
A naturally-ignited wildland fire that is managed for the purpose of achieving specific previously defined resource management objectives.
windfall

Trees knocked over or broken off by wind, increasing fuel loading and hampering the building of a fireline. Large, unmanaged areas of dense blowdown can create serious fire hazards once the larger fuels become dry.

== See also ==
- Glossary of firefighting
- Glossary of firefighting equipment
- List of basic firefighting topics
- List of wildfire behaviors
