= Overall (surname) =

Overall is a surname. Notable people with the surname include:

- Christine Overall (born 1949), Canadian philosopher
- John Overall (architect) (1913–2001), Australian architect
- John Overall (bishop) (1559–1619), English bishop
- Orval Overall (1881–1947), American baseball player
- Park Overall (born 1957), American actress and activist
- Scott Overall (born 1983), British athlete

== See also ==
- Overall, garment
- Overall (disambiguation)
