= Overall, Tennessee =

Unincorporated community in Tennessee, US

Coordinates: 35°48′36″N 86°28′30″W

Overall is an unincorporated community in Rutherford County, Tennessee.

== History ==
A post office called Overall was established in 1880, and remained in operation until 1953. The community has the name of John C. Overall, a pioneer citizen.
