= List of firefighting mnemonics =

This is a list of mnemonics related to firefighting or rescue.

== Mnemonics ==
Incident priorities

LIP

Life safety

Incident Stabilization

Property conservation

=== Fire scene priorities ===
RECEO - SV

Rescue victims

Exposures - stop fire spread

Confine - contain the fire

Extinguish

Overhaul - check for hidden fire spread

- targets of opportunity:

Salvage

Vent

Company Officer Checklist For Report On Conditions

SLICERS

Size up

Locate seat of fire

Identify flow path

Cool from safe distance

Extinguish fire

Rescue

Salvage

=== First attack response ===
RACE (General first response to a fire.)

Rescue - move people who are in immediate danger.

Alarm - raise the alarm and alert persons to the presence of fire.

Confine - shut doors and reduce airflow and fuel sources to the fire, to reduce its spread.

Extinguish or Evacuate - extinguish the fire if it's safe to do so, or coordinate the evacuation from the area.

=== Response phases ===
TRIPOD ( The six different possible primary phases of a fire response.)

Transitional - moving from an offensive attack to a defensive position.

Rescue - victim rescue

Investigating

Preparing

Offensive

Defensive

=== Wildland firefighting safety ===
PLACES

-Safety checklist

PPE

Lookouts

Awareness

Communications

Escape routes

Safety zones

=== Fire safety ===
EDITH (A life-safety home education program.)

Exit

Drills

In

The

Home

Hazmat Placards

EGFFOPRCO

(Every Good Fire Fighter Occasionally Provides Real Cool Orgasms)

1. Explosives

2. Gas (flammable)

3. Flammable Liquids

4. Flammable Solids

5. Oxidizers

6. Poisons/Toxics

7. Radioactives

8. Corrosives

9. Other Regulated Materials/Miscellaneous

=== How to use a fire extinguisher ===
PASS (Fire extinguisher use education for everyone)

Pull the pin

Aim at the base of the fire

Squeeze the handle or lever

Sweep from side to side

== See also ==
- List of medical mnemonics (Includes EMS mnemonics)
