= Overhaul (firefighting) =

Overhaul is the process of searching for hidden fire extension on a fire scene, soon after the main fire has been extinguished. This is a vital process to prevent rekindling, from concealed spaces and still burning objects. It is used in conjunction with salvage operations to reduce loss caused by fire. However, there are risks associated with the process. Such as, physical injury from falling objects, strained muscles due to poor technique, being struck by another firefighter's equipment and more. Additionally, there is a large risk of respiratory damage if the proper PPE (Personal Protective Equipment) is not used. Leading to a higher risk of cancer along with heart and lung diseases. Overhaul is one of the last steps in the firefighting process.
