= Company officer (firefighter) =

A company officer (CO) is the individual in charge of a crew of firefighters and their responding apparatus in the United States. Company Officers have different titles depending on the table of organization for their particular agency, but commonly used titles in the U.S. Fire Service include Lieutenant, Captain, Sergeant, or other ranks which reflect the paramilitary organization of most departments.

Company Officers in U.S. career fire departments are generally promoted after passing a series of written tests, oral interviews, and tactical evaluations. A certain amount of time in service or time in grade is also often required before an individual is eligible to test for the next highest rank within the department. Seniority may determine whether an officer is in charge of one responding apparatus, or is in charge of an entire station where multiple fire apparatus are housed.

Officer ranks above the company officer level are frequently referred to as "Chief Officer" ranks. Whereas a Company Officer is generally involved with fireground tactical operations in addition to their supervisory duties, Chief Officers are rarely involved with hands-on fireground operations.

== Responsibilities and duties ==
The responsibilities of a company officer include:

- Meeting the organizations goals and objectives
- Keeping the work area free of health and safety hazards
- Building teamwork and cooperation
- Developing subordinates skills
- Keeping records and making reports

The duties of a company officer include:

- Maintaining health and safety
- Enforcing departmental rules and regulations
- Managing company activities
- Collecting pre-incident plan data
- Conducting company fire inspections
- Conducting company training evolutions
- Facilitating company communications
- Building company motivation
- Implementing departmental goals and objectives
- Performing career counseling and problem solving
- Keeping department records and making reports

== See also ==
- Incident commander
- Fire chief
