= Firefighter assist and search team =

Team dedicated to firefighter rescue

A firefighter assist and search team (FAST), also known as a rapid intervention team (RIT)/,rapid intervention crew (RIC)/,rapid intervention group (RIG)/,rapid intervention dispatch (RID) or breathing apparatus safety team (BAST), is a team of two or more firefighters who are dedicated solely to the search and rescue of other firefighters in distress. Multiple-alarm fires may require multiple FAST/RIC Personnel.

Through the late 1960s and early 1970s the London Fire Brigade introduced RIT procedures using EATL (emergency air transfer lines) and EASE (emergency air supply equipment). This consisted of designated firefighter search and rescue teams (termed "emergency crews") stationed at self-contained breathing apparatus (SCBA) control entry points, equipped with emergency SCBA specifically designed to be worn by unconscious, injured or trapped firefighters.

The National Fire Protection Association (NFPA) and the United States Occupational Safety and Health Administration (OSHA) have requirements for some type of Firefighter Assist and Search Team (FAST)/Rapid Intervention Team (RIT) at structure fires.These standards require that a minimum of two fire fighters be standing by in full personal protective equipment (PPE) while other crew members are working in a hazardous atmosphere.The standards are the result of a series of incidents where fire fighters became lost, trapped or disoriented while fighting a structure fire without a Firefighter Assist and Search Team (FAST) present.

The FAST concept is not universal, with many fire protection agencies training all personnel in rescue duties. Rescue teams are then designated based on apparatus order in the dispatch to a call in which standard operating procedures (SOPs) require that rescue teams be held at entry points. This is the basic concept of the two-in, two-out rule.

While all of these versions of the name for a firefighter rescue crew either have been used or continue to be used in several areas, the National Incident Management System (NIMS) has determined that rapid intervention crew (RIC) will be the standard term. Currently, U.S. federally required training programs, from DHS and FEMA, are in the process of standardizing many terms and procedures under NIMS.

== FAST equipment ==
FAST members are normally equipped with some or all of the following:

- Full turnout gear
- Self-contained breathing apparatus (SCBA)
- Personal alert safety system (PASS device)
- Portable radio that uses the fireground frequency and is available to the incident commander
- Hand tools
- Hand light
- Search rope or webbing
- Rapid air transport (RAT) bag which slips over an SCBA bottle and holds an extra mask to tap into the bottle to provide a downed firefighter with air. This so-called RIT Bag was invented by Darrin Shaw, a firefighter with Central Pierce Fire and Rescue. The term RIT Bag is now widely used, but the trademark stays with RIT BAG from Puyallup, Washington.
