= Mattydale lay =

Way of storing hose on a fire engine

A hose lay or hose load is a preconfigured arrangement of fire hose that facilitates deployment under high-stress, high-danger situations.

A Mattydale lay, also called "cross-lay", "speedlay", and "transverse lay", is a method of storing hose on a fire engine. This method of storing hose is designed for rapid deployment of a hose line to attack a fire. In this manner, the hose is stored perpendicularly across the fire apparatus, usually above or adjacent to the pump panel, instead of the usual parallel storage in the rear. This allows the firefighter to pull the hose in the direction of the fire instead of having to make a turn.

== History ==
The Mattydale lay was designed in 1947 by Chief Burton L. Eno of the Mattydale, New York Fire Department. It was first installed on a 1939 Buffalo Fire Appliance Corp. "Pathfinder" fire engine.

== Use ==
Most modern American fire apparatus use some sort of variation of the Mattydale lay. There are several different types of "hose loads" in use, which is the way the hose is folded in the lay:

- Accordion load – The hose is loaded so that when it is flat, it is standing on end. The finished load resembles an accordion.
- Flat load – The flat hose is simply placed in the track so that it is stacked. Most large supply lines coming off the back of the fire apparatus are stored using a flat load because of ease of deployment and re-packing.
- Horseshoe load – Similar to the accordion load, but the whole load is folded in half, resembling a horseshoe. Some departments use a "reverse horseshoe" load.
- Minuteman load – A special load that allows the firefighters to pull a large section of the hose onto their shoulders and have it drop off (called "paying out") in an organized fashion as they advance towards the fire.
- "S" load, more commonly known as the "triple-layer" load – The hose is folded three times before being loaded. The threefold resembles a large letter "S". This method allows all of the hose to be deployed rapidly in an organized manner, and is particularly useful for operating in tight spaces.

== Constructing a hose load ==
Generally, it takes several individuals to build a hose load, at least one on each end. A third person handing the hose to the two individuals on the ends facilitates the process. After the desired length of hose is connected, and sometimes the air removed from the interior with a fire hose vacuum, it is laid in a compartment or hose bed in a predetermined manner depending on the type of lay being built. Almost always the nozzle or female end or both are made easily accessible from the exterior. In the case of a "pre-connect", the female coupling is attached to a discharge on the engine, making deployment even faster.
