= Two-in, two-out =

Respiratory protection standard in firefighting

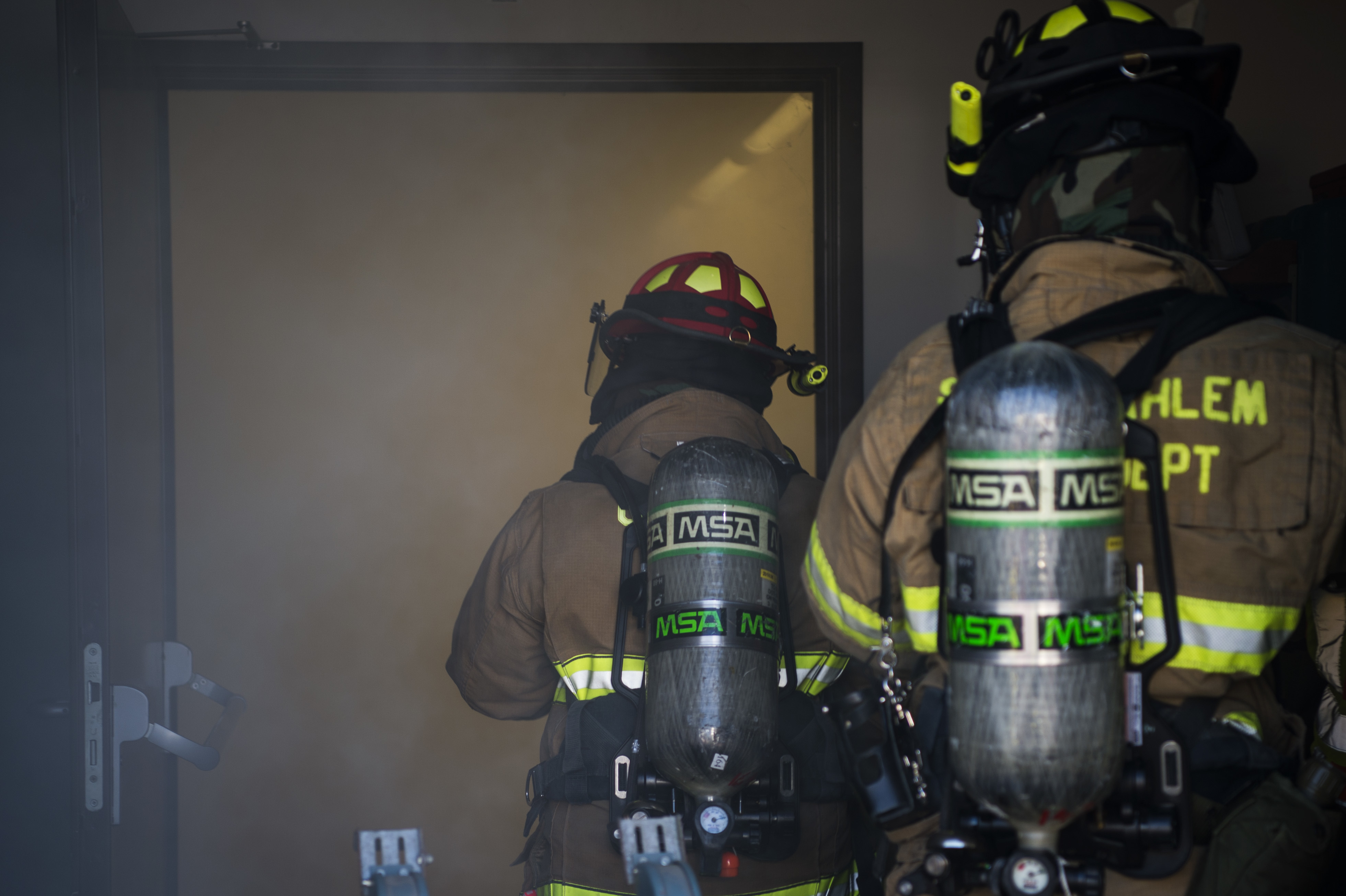
Two firefighters entering a building during a training exercise

In firefighting, the policy of two-in, two-out refers to United States Occupational Safety and Health Administration (OSHA) policy 29 CFR 1910.134(g)(4)(i).

The respiratory protection standard requires that workers engaged in fighting interior structural fires work in a buddy system; at least two workers must enter the building together, so that they can monitor each other's whereabouts as well as the work environment. There must also be at least two standby personnel outside the fire area prepared to rescue the inside firefighters should the need arise. One of these outside firefighters must actively monitor the status of the inside fighters but the second outside firefighter may perform a variety of other duties, such as pump operations, acting as Incident Commander, or outside hose line operation. There are no provisions in the standard to waive the requirements for either the "two-inside firefighters" or the "two-outside firefighters", although the circumstances under which this provision applies are more limited than generally understood.

The standard does not require the "two-in/two-out" provision if the fire is still in the incipient stage, nor does it prohibit firefighters from fighting the fire from outside before sufficient personnel have arrived. It also does not prohibit firefighters from entering a burning structure to perform Search and Rescue operations when there is a reasonable belief that victims may be inside. It is only when firefighters are engaged in the interior attack of an interior structural firefighting that the "two-in/two-out" requirement applies. The interpretation covers the number of persons who must be on the scene before fire fighting personnel may begin the interior attack on an interior structural fire. Until those persons arrive on the scene, fire fighters may fight the blaze from outside the structure and carry out rescue activities. It is the incident commander's responsibility to judge whether a fire is an interior structural fire and how it will be attacked.

== Explanation ==
=== Two-in ===
The respiratory protection standard requires that workers engaged in fighting interior structural fires work in a buddy system; at least two workers must enter the building together, so that they can monitor each other's whereabouts as well as the work environment. An interior structural fire (an advanced fire that has spread inside of the building where high temperatures, "heat" and dense smoke are normally occurring) would present an "Immediately Dangerous to Life or Health" (IDLH) atmosphere and therefore, require the use of respirators. There should always be at least two firefighters together when they enter a location that is deemed a hazard area that is considered IDLH (i.e., the interior of the structure fire). Firefighters operating in the hazard area must operate in a buddy system and maintain voice or visual contact with one another at all times. This helps in assuring accountability within the team. They must operate together as a team all the time they are in the hazard area. If one firefighter has to leave the hazard area, for any reason, such as air supply getting low, they must both exit.

=== Two-out ===
OSHA requires that one of the two firefighters outside must be dedicated to accounting for the two firefighters inside, and, if necessary, initiate a fire fighter rescue. The other firefighter is permitted to take on other roles, such as incident commander in charge of the emergency incident, safety officer or equipment/pump operator. However, the second firefighter outside cannot be assigned tasks that are critical to the safety and health of any other employee working at the incident.

These rules also apply to all training with live fires inside structures, and are even more important when inexperienced trainees are inside.

Incipient stage fire An incipient stage fire is defined as a fire that is in the initial or beginning stage and can be controlled or extinguished by portable fire extinguishers, Class II standpipe, or small hose systems without the need for protective clothing or breathing apparatus.

- Note 2 to paragraph (g): Nothing in this section is meant to preclude firefighters from performing emergency rescue activities (Search) before an entire team has assembled.

== Rapid intervention crew ==
The National Fire Protection Association (NFPA) defines the policy that refers to a safety system to protect firefighters, known as rapid intervention crew (RIC) or firefighter assist and search team (FAST), where two or more firefighters enter a building and at least two more remain outside, near the entrance, fully equipped and ready to help in case of emergency.

Firefighters enter a building in teams to extinguish the fire and/or make a rescue. When a team enters an IDLH atmosphere (the "two-in"), two more firefighters (the "two-out") stand by at the entrance in full personal protective equipment (to include bunker gear and self-contained breathing apparatus), and ready with rescue tools, in order to rapidly enter the building if the team inside becomes endangered. By some interpretations, the rule requires at least two more firefighters to remain outside, even when the standby team has gone in to find and rescue the first team. However, the rule specifically exempts an emergency rescue with fewer personnel on hand (i.e., no additional "two-out" required if they go in to find the "two-in"), although the increased risk to all four should be obvious if further backup is not on-scene.

The two firefighters who are specifically designated as standing by outside are referred to in different ways by many localities. The NFPA designated term is "RIC", some are referred to as a rapid intervention team, and others are referred to as a F.A.S.T. truck (as in the Fire Department of New York).

Where there are teams working inside multiple entrances of a large structure fire, there may be standby teams designated at each entry point, although the rule does not necessarily mean two firefighters ready outside for every two inside.

Other tactics work within the rule to "stage" the next team, ready to relieve the inside team when their air supplies run low. When the third team arrives to serve as the RIT, the second team enters, follows the hose line to the first team and relieves them. This is naturally smoother with good radio communications between officers.

== Application in France ==
Until 1999, the firefighting in France was performed according to the "Rules of instruction and maneuvers" (Règlement d'instructions et de manoeuvres, RIM). The firefighters acted in teams of three members, called "trinomial" (trinôme): one chief, one deputy chief and one support; a fire engine with eight people thus had two trinom, an engine chief (chef d'agrès) and a driver. In the 1990s, the Paris Fire Brigade started to work with teams of two people, called "binomial teams" (équipes en binôme) or shortly "binomials" (binômes). This organisation was generalised to the whole France in a departmental order signed by the minister of Internal Affairs the 3 February 1999. An engine with eight people now has three binomials, an engine chief and a driver; an engine with six people has two binomials, an engine chief and a driver.

A binomial can be assigned two types of missions:

- exploration and attack mission (binôme d'attaque, BAT);
- water supply and support mission (binôme d'alimentation, BAL).

The mission can change during an intervention (i.e., an attack binomial can become a supply binomial or vice versa).

The "usual" intervention (simple fire with only one fire engine and six people, no casualty, no specific risk) thus involves two binomials.

1. The engine chief makes a reconnaissance with an attack binomial. The other binomial stands by outside, ready to help the reconnaissance team.
2. The attack binomial unrolls the fire hoses at the "attack point" defined by the engine chief and prepare to go to the target also defined by the engine chief. The supply binomial joins the attack point to the fire engine with hoses.
3. The attack binomial starts the firefighting. The supply binomial joins the fire engine to the hydrant.
4. The supply binomial stands by, ready to help the attack binomial.

The overall organisation is the same when more engines are involved.

== Germany ==
German fire services regulations (FwDV) demand that firefighters must always operate in teams of two, called a Trupp; and that an interior attack with breathing apparatus may only be undertaken if there's at least a Staffel on scene, which consists of six firefighters: two Trupps, a commander, and an engineer. Furthermore, every incident scene where breathing apparatus is in use must have at least one Trupp with breathing apparatus on standby as a dedicated rescue team, and more where appropriate.

== See also ==
- Fire service in France
