= Fire hose vacuum =

Pneumatic device

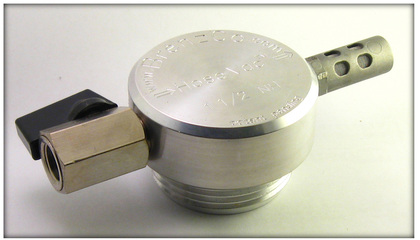
Fire hose vacuum

A fire hose vacuum is a small pneumatic device that removes residual air from the inside of a fire hose, thus making it smaller and somewhat rigid. This allows more hose or other equipment to be stored on a fire apparatus, and makes loads or packs more easily deployable.
