= Elite Athlete Centre and Hotel =

Loughborough University training center

Coordinates: 52.7685624°N 1.2334555°W

The Elite Athlete Centre and Hotel is a training base and hotel opened on the Loughborough University campus in November 2018. The hotel is run by Imago Venues, the service that manages conferences and events at Loughborough University.

The Hotel is part of Loughborough University's Student Village project which sees 617 new student bedrooms in new halls of residence opening in October 2018 and October 2019. The project is being managed by Faithful+Gould.

== Facilities ==
The Elite Athlete Centre has 44 bedrooms, all of which meet accessibility standards. 20 of the bedrooms are altitude rooms, with the aim of facilitating altitude training, specifically the Live-high, train-low philosophy.

Guests have access to Loughborough University's sporting facilities, including the High Performance Athletics Centre, one of two UK Athletics National Performance Centres.

== See also ==
- Loughborough University
