= New Dimension programme =

UK government fire and rescue programme

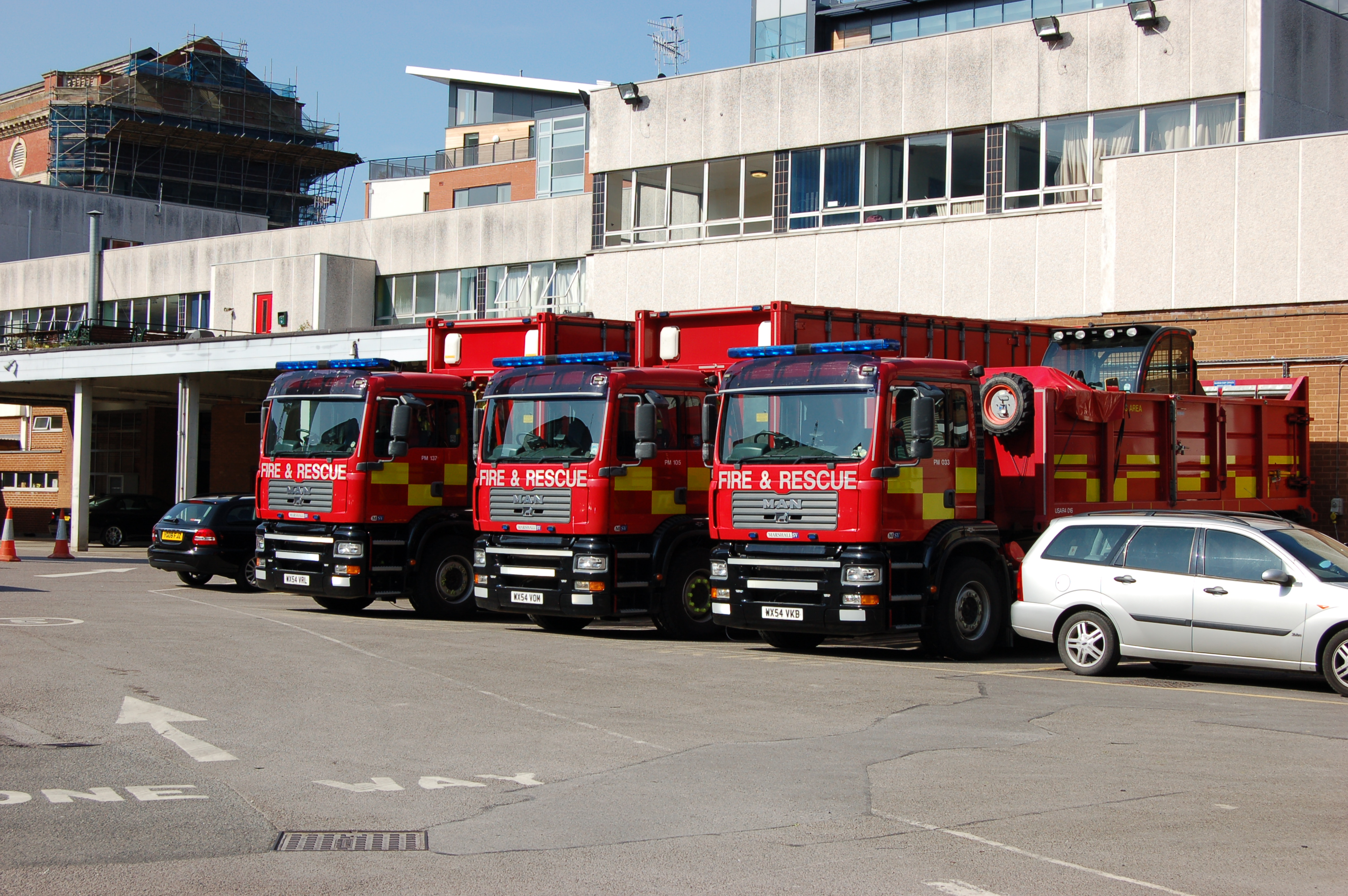
New Dimension vehicles of Avon Fire and Rescue Service

The New Dimension programme, sometimes referred to as the New Dimension or New Dimensions, was started by the Department for Communities and Local Government in the UK, for fire and rescue services in England and Wales, following the September 11, 2001 attacks in the United States. It has provided equipment, training and standardised procedures to deal with terrorist attacks and major environmental disasters.

The New Dimension programme operates at a national, regional and local level, and while it does not apply specifically to Scotland, a Fire and Rescue Service circular, published in 2007 noted that: "Officials in the Welsh Assembly Government and the Scottish Executive agree in principle that the general terms of the Mutual Aid Protocol should apply 'cross-border' between Scotland, England (and Wales)." In 2004, the provision of the New Dimensions Programme in Wales was devolved to the Welsh Assembly. Despite devolution, the Welsh New Dimensions policies, equipment and vehicles are near identical to its English and Scottish counterparts, training regularly with the two.

By July 2004, the New Dimension programme had provided £56 million to various projects; a further £132 million was promised for the period up to 2007. New Dimension provides a co-ordinated approach across the emergency services, and local authority emergency planners and the scheme has been supported and promoted by the Chief Fire Officers Association.

== Programme scope ==
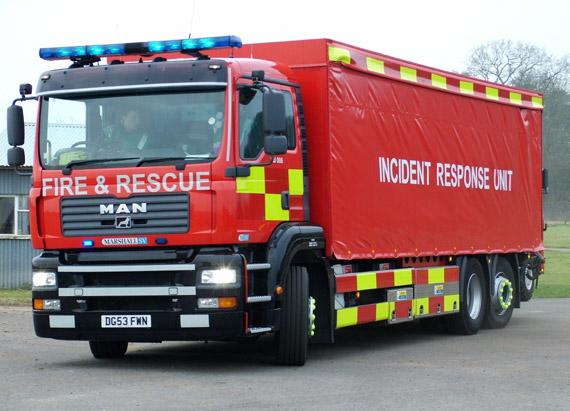
A New Dimension Incident Response Unit operated by Norfolk Fire and Rescue Service

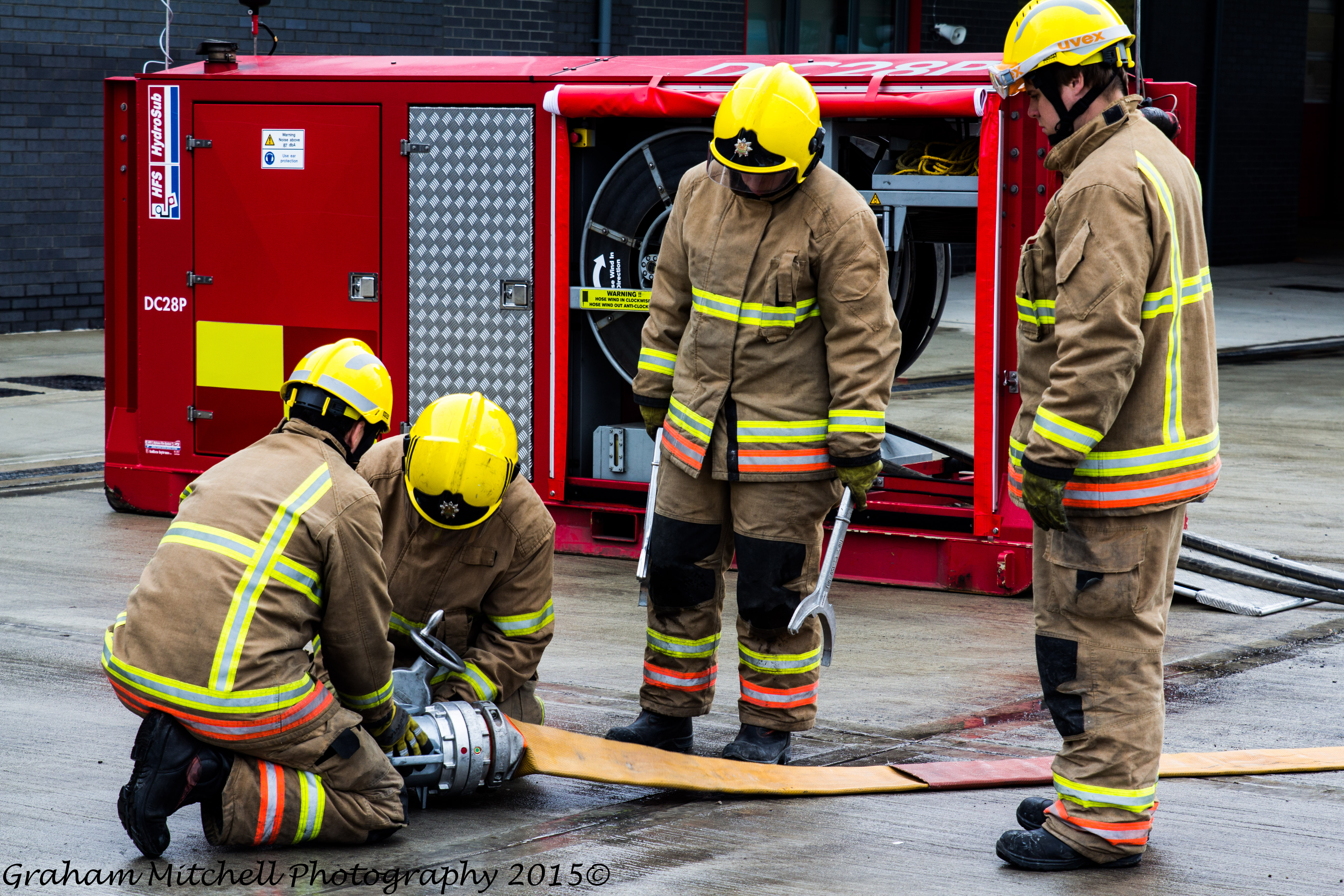
Northumberland Fire and Rescue Service firefighters training with a New Dimension High Volume Pump module

The purpose of New Dimension is to provide information and guidance for fire and rescue services on emergency response to the following specific types of incident:

- Terrorist chemical, biological, radiological and nuclear (CBRN) threats
- Chemical, biological, radiological and nuclear incidents
- Industrial and domestic accidents
- Chemical spills and collapsed buildings
- Natural disasters
- Floods and earthquakes

The onus is on fire services to provide "New Dimension capability", and legislation for England, passed in April 2007, recognised a fire and rescue service's responsibilities for dealing with the above types of incident. The Fire and Rescue Services (Emergencies) (England) Order 2007 is a statutory instrument which requires that fire services make provision for dealing with CBRN incidents and structural collapse.

The New Dimension programme was part of Department for Communities and Local Government's fire resilience programme, which also included the FireLink and FiReControl projects. Funding from the New Dimension scheme has been used (as one example) to provide fire services with new specialist Urban Search and Rescue appliances and equipment. Previously, fire services were not specifically equipped to deal with largescale USAR incidents.

318 New Dimension appliances, 238 of these being prime movers with removeable 'pods' and the remaining 80 being Incident Response Units equipped for decontamination, were supplied by Marshall Specialist Vehicles on MAN TGA chassis. These were equipped with FireLink digital radios on delivery, creating a single wide area communications system across England, Wales and Scotland. By March 2006, a majority of New Dimensions prime movers had been distributed to fire and rescue services in England and Wales as part of the scheme, however some that were deemed surplus to requirements were also sold to the Northern Ireland Fire and Rescue Service and the fire services that today constitute the Scottish Fire and Rescue Service. The vehicles are maintained on a contractual basis by Babcock International.

Vehicles part of New Dimension until scrapped in 2016:

- Incident Response Unit
- Detection, Identification, Monitoring
- Prime Mover to carry pods
- Urban Search and Rescue pod
- High Volume Pump pod

=== Operational use ===
New Dimension appliances have been used in a number of roles since the scheme's creation. Notable uses include various floods such as the 2007 United Kingdom floods, the Buncefield fire, the Stockline Plastics factory explosion in Glasgow and the 7 July 2005 London bombings.

== Future ==
Twenty two incident response units, representing a third of the vehicles allocated to the New Dimension programme, were withdrawn from fire and rescue services across England on 31 December 2015, following a review by the Government which stated that a total 43 IRUs would be sufficient for England and Wales. The review had also concluded that power respirator protective suits stored in the 22 IRUs were nearing their expiry dates, suggesting a need for the immediate withdrawal of the IRUs.

Babcock International's maintenance contract for the New Dimensions vehicles, awarded in 2008, is set to expire in 2024, by which it had been deemed by the Home Office that some New Dimensions equipment was nearing the end of their operational lives. Planning for the New Dimensions 2 programme commenced in 2019 with reviews of fire and rescue services' usage of New Dimension equipment nationwide since their introduction in 2004, including a fire and rescue service's use of CBRN equipment as well as their Urban Search and Rescue capabilities. The New Dimension 2 reviews intend to identify a need for the replacement of existing New Dimensions equipment and vehicles in 2024.
