= Tianjin World Financial Center =

Supertall skyscraper in Tianjin, China

The Tianjin Tower
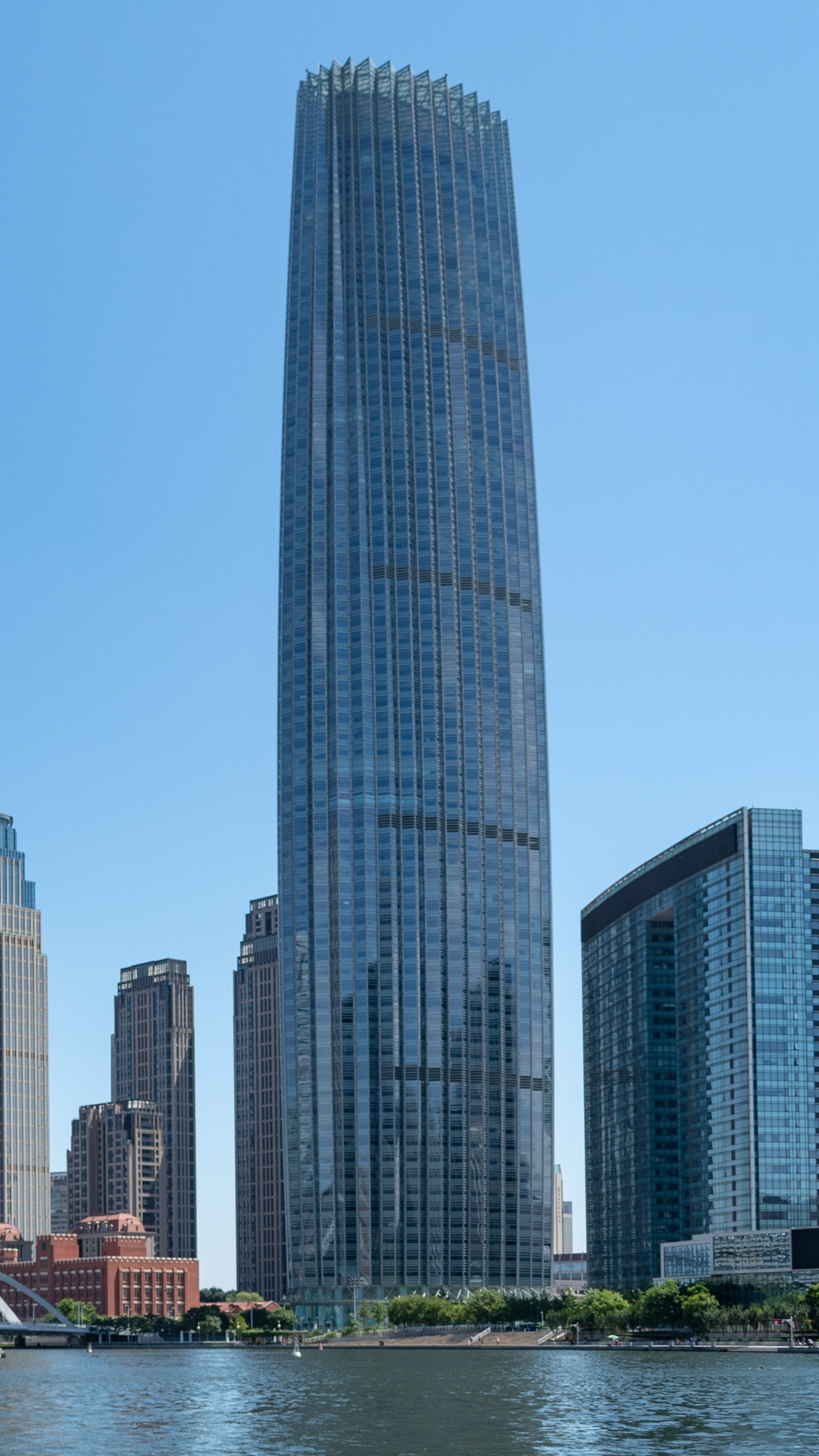
- Tianjin World Financial Center in 2018
- Interactive map of the The Tianjin Tower area

General information
- Status: Completed
- Type: Office
- Location: Tianjin; China
- Coordinates: 39°07′44″N 117°11′47″E
- Construction started: December 17, 2007
- Completed: Topped out 14 January 2010
- Opening: March 6, 2011
- Cost: 3.5 billion yuan
- Owner: Financial Street Holding

Height
- Architectural: 336.9 meters (1,105 ft)
- Top floor: 313.6 m (1,029 ft)
- Observatory: 313.6 m (1,029 ft)

Technical details
- Floor count: 74

Design and construction
- Architect: Skidmore, Owings and Merrill
- Structural engineer: Skidmore, Owings & Merrill LLP (SOM-SF)

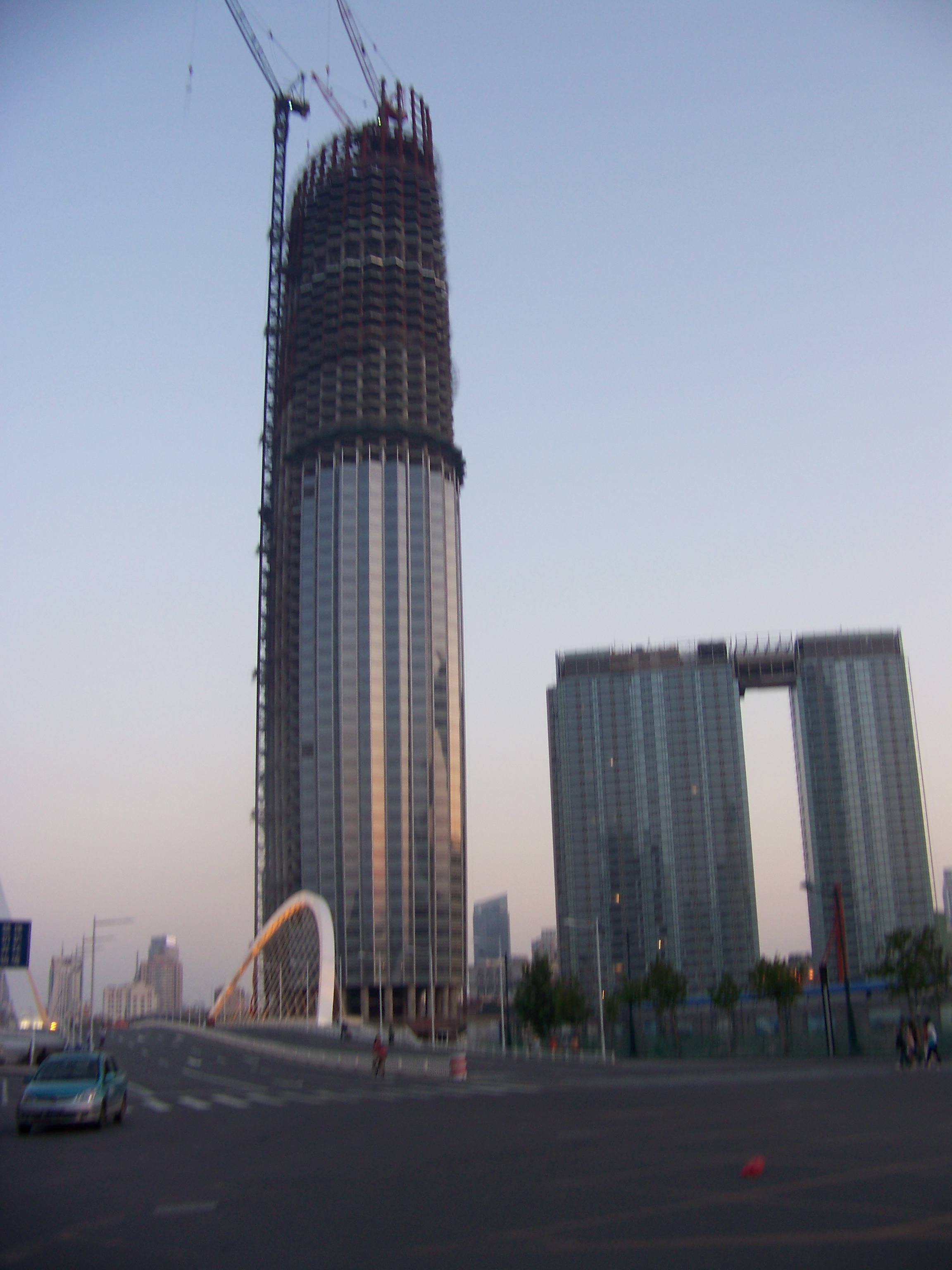
Tianjin World Financial Center as seen from the north from the other side of Dagu Bridge.

The Tianjin Tower, or Jin Tower (Chinese: 津塔; pinyin: Jīntǎ), or Tianjin World Financial Center (Chinese: 天津环球金融中心; pinyin: Tiānjīn Huánqiú Jīnróng Zhōngxīn) is a modern supertall skyscraper located in the Heping District of Tianjin, China, on the banks of the Hai River. The mixed-use tower is 336.9 meters (1,105 ft) tall and contains 74 floors above ground and 4 below, with an observation deck at 305.2 meters (1,001 ft). The area of the glass unitized curtain wall, manufactured by Jangho Group, is 215,000 m^{2}. It is notable as the first office building in Tianjin to be equipped with double decker elevators.

The skyscraper was topped-out on January 14, 2010 and opened on March 6, 2011.

The building is owned by Financial Street Holding, with JLL (company) as joint sales and leasing agents.

== History ==
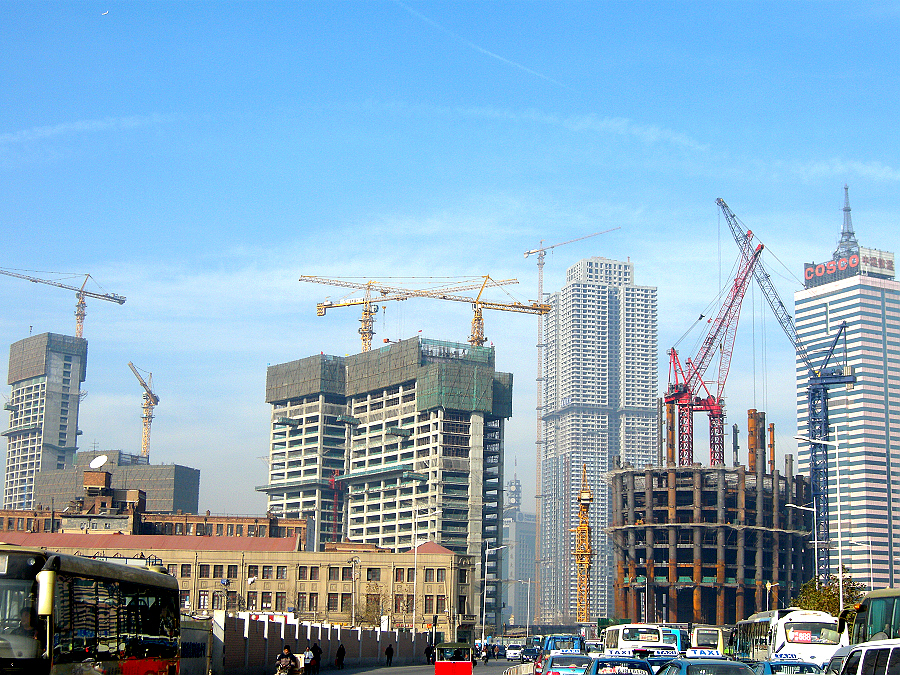
28 November 2008

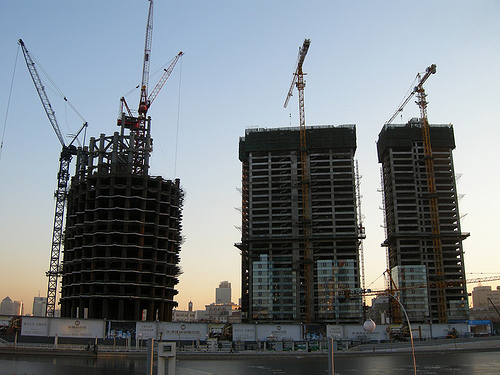
6 January 2009

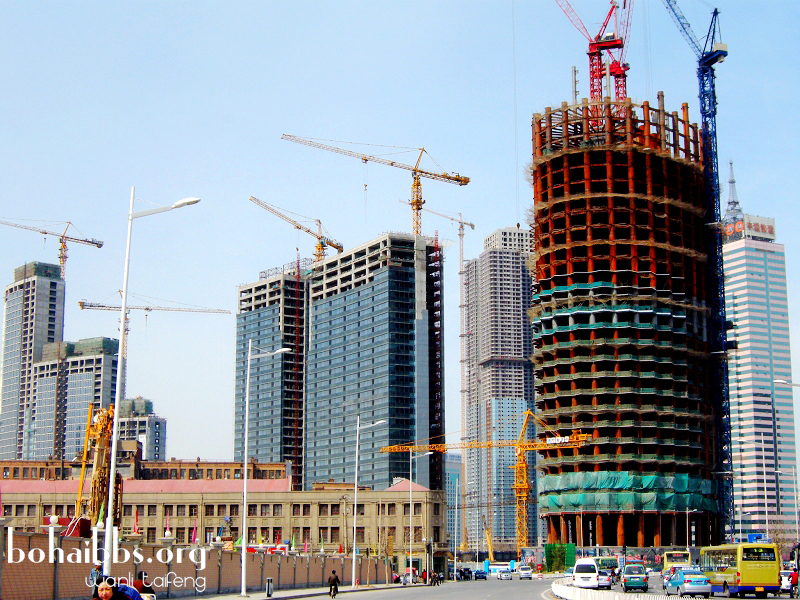
26 March 2009

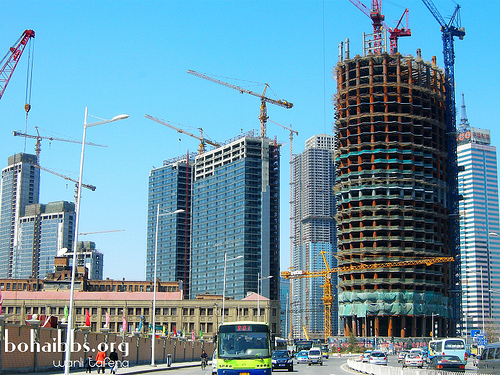
1 April 2009

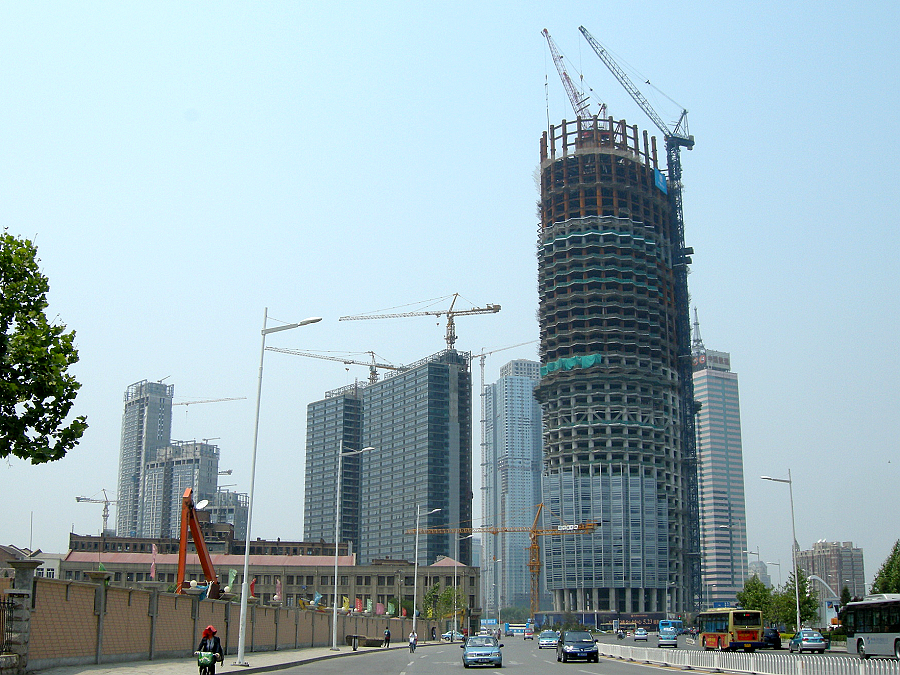
7 May 2009

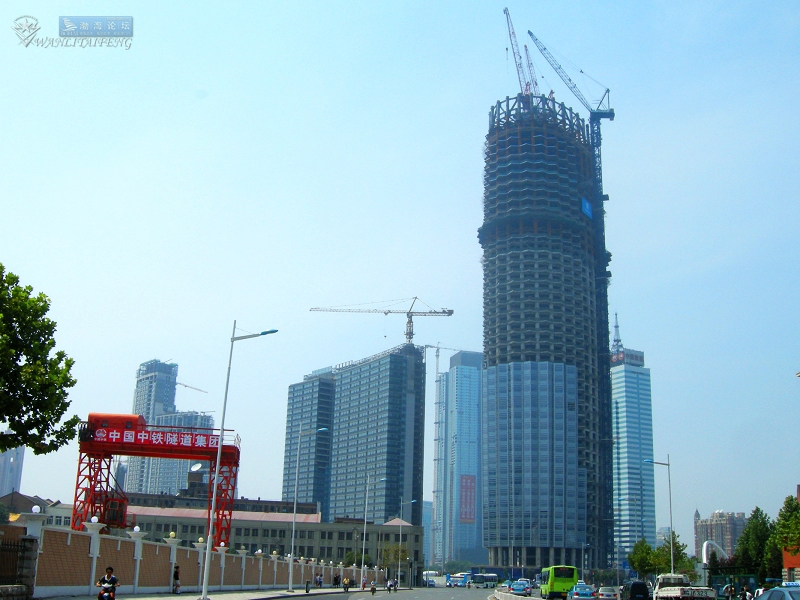
10 July 2009

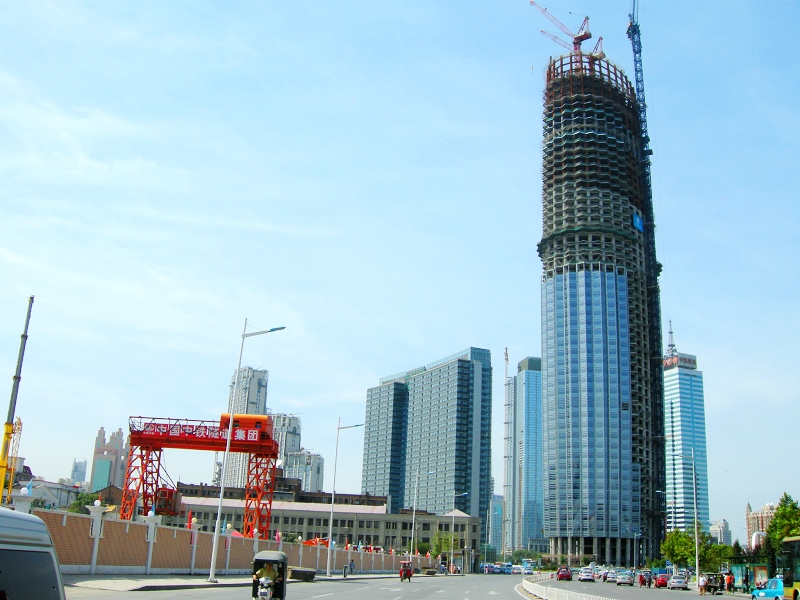
28 August 2009

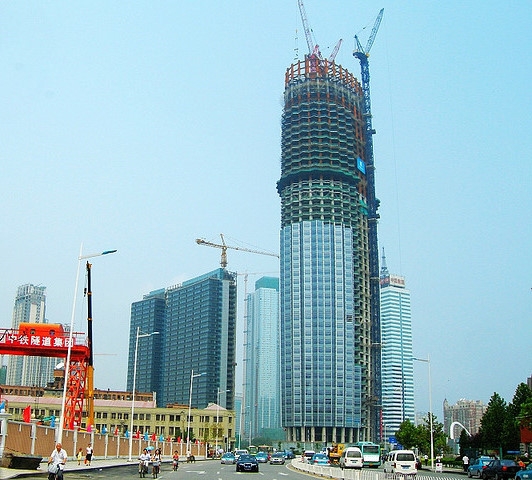
31 July 2009

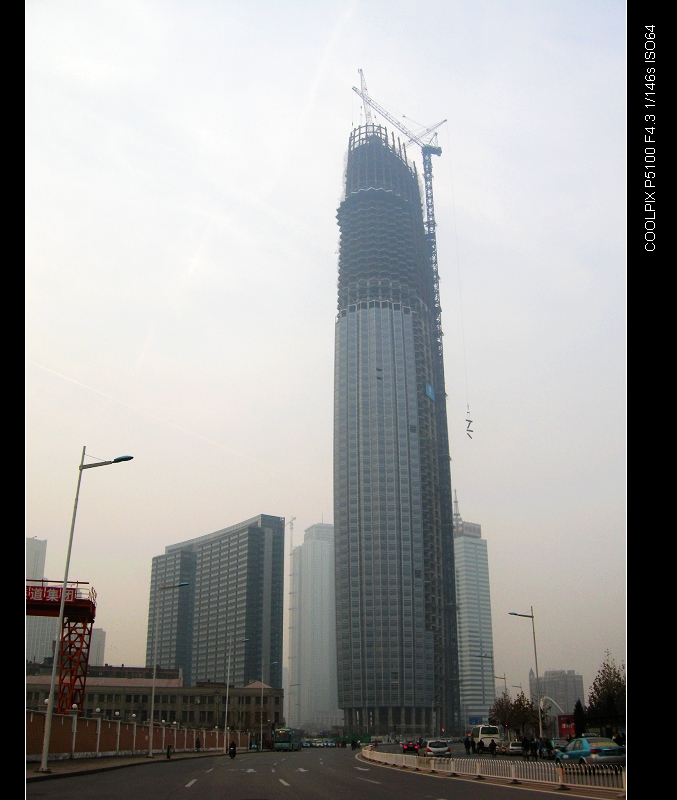
26 November 2009

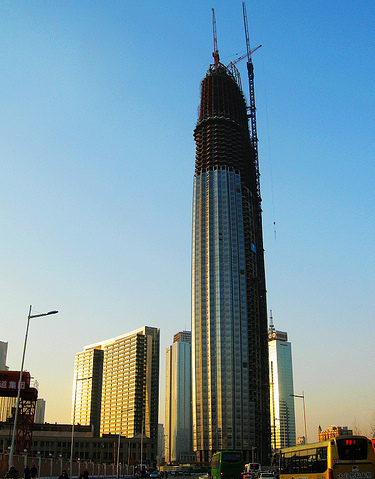
31 December 2009
