= Atkins (company) =

Former British design and construction company

- Type: Private (1938–2017); Subsidiary (2017–2023)
- Industry: Construction, design, engineering and business services
- Founded: 1938
- Founder: Sir William Atkins
- Defunct: 2017
- Fate: Bought by SNC-Lavalin
- Successor: AtkinsRéalis
- Headquarters: Nova North, London, England
- Number of locations: Offices in 28 countries
- Key people: Philip Hoare (President)
- Services: Consultancy services
- Revenue: £2.081 billion (2017)
- Operating income: £171.5 million (2017)
- Net income: £164.6 million (2017)
- Number of employees: 18,300 (March 2017)
- Subsidiaries: Faithful+Gould

Atkins was a British multinational construction, design, engineering and business services company. It was formerly listed on the London Stock exchange and had a London headquarters. In July 2017 the company was bought by SNC-Lavalin a £2.1 billion deal. The new group was subsequently renamed AtkinsRéalis in 2023.

The company was founded as W. S. Atkins & Partners by Sir William Atkins in 1938. It experienced rapid growth following the Second World War, performing specialist services in town planning, engineering sciences, architecture and project management. The firm was admitted to the London Stock Exchange in 1996, trading under the name WS Atkins plc for a time before rebranding as Atkins during 2002. While Atkins largely focused on the UK market during its formative years, it has grown into an international firm with a global presence, as well as expanded into a wide range of sectors, including aerospace and high speed railways.

By 2016, Atkins had become the UK's largest engineering consultancy, as well as the world's 11th largest global design firm. It employed approximately 18,000 staff based in 300 offices across 29 countries and had undertaken projects in over 150 countries. The firm's motto was "Plan, Design, Enable".

== History ==
The original company, W. S. Atkins & Partners, was established by William Atkins in 1938. The venture was not Atkin's only business endeavour, having acquired London Ferro-Concrete from his prior employers; he continued to actively manage both firms up until 1950. In its formative years, the firm established its first offices in Westminster, London and specialised in civil and structural engineering design and consultancy work. Throughout the Second World War, the company developed a reputation for competently performing complex engineering works assigned to it despite the unavoidable wartime pressures and limitations that were imposed. Amongst other works, Atkins developed a patented anti-aircraft turret during this period.

In the aftermath of the conflict, the firm expanded rapidly to support the postwar reconstruction effort, supplying specialist services in town planning, engineering sciences, architecture and project management. During 1945, Atkins was invited to consult on the planned expansion of the Port Talbot Steelworks and subsequently acted as the civil and structural design engineer for the project. In 1950, Atkins opted to discontinue contracting work to concentrate on design engineering and project management work. During the 1950s, the firm became involved in the engineering of the Berkeley Nuclear Power Station, which became the first exclusively civilian nuclear power station in the UK upon its completion; the company continued to be active in the nuclear sector both domestically and abroad. In the 1960s, Atkins provided tunneling designed for the fledgling Toronto subway network. During the 1970s, the company supported the construction of Drax Power Station, the largest power generation facility in the UK.

Up until 1982, the year in which he retired, William Akins served as the company's chairman. In 1996, W. S. Atkins was admitted to the London Stock Exchange and began trading as W. S. Atkins plc. That same year, it also acquired Faithful+Gould, a cost and project management consultancy firm. Throughout the 1980s and early 1990s, Atkins played a key role in the engineering of the Channel Tunnel; completed in 1994, it possesses the longest underwater section of any tunnel in the world. During the late 1990s, WS Atkins performed work on the Burj al Arab hotel, which was completed in 1999.

In 2002, the company begun trading under the Atkins name. That same year, it also bought Hanscomb, construction consultants. During the early 2000s, the company experienced a period of financial difficulties, resulting in the share price falling to 50p in 2002 and the company's Chief Executive, Robin Southwell, resigning along with Finance Director Ric Piper, who was also told his new job at Trinity Mirror was no longer open to him. Keith Clarke replaced him, joining from Skanska.

Atkins was one of the five shareholders in Metronet, the London Underground maintenance company that failed in 2007, after which Atkins was forced to write off its investment in the venture. During 2009, Atkins was selected as the official engineering design services provider for the 2012 Summer Olympics; the company provided building services design, civil engineering and structural engineering, acoustics, fire protection engineering, and accessibility services.

As a consequence of the general economic downturn experienced during the Great Recession, Atkins reduced its headcount as a cost-saving measure; approximately 3000 staff left the business between April 2009 and February 2011, although the overall headcount remained relatively stable following the acquisition of the American company PBS&J during August 2010. The purchase of PBS&J, a Florida-based provider of engineering, planning, architecture, construction, environmental, and program management services, was viewed as a major buy into the North American market for Atkins.

Although Atkins had not traditionally involved itself in the aerospace sector, the firm decided to build up its presence in the market, quickly forming links with British aero engine manufacturer Rolls-Royce Holdings and the multinational aerospace firm Airbus. Its first major aerospace project was to perform a stress-check analysis of the wing proposed for the Airbus A380 airliner, later expanding to perform work on the wings of the Airbus A320 and Airbus A350 XWB airliners as well as the Airbus A400M Atlas military airlifter. Atkins was reportedly keen to expand within the North American region, particularly with Boeing and its supply chain. By 2011, roughly 500 staff around the globe were working in the aerospace sector; Atkins divisional managing director Neil Kirk noted the firm's plans to expand and double turnover from this sector over the following three to four years.

Atkins has also been highly active in the engineering of high speed railways. The company's own analysis noted that Europe's high speed rail network was expected to expand three-fold between 2008 and 2020, while passenger rail travel in the UK was growing far faster than official forecasts had predicted. In 2001, the UK's Strategic Rail Authority commissioned Atkins to produce a feasibility study into the business case for, and the transportation impact of, high-speed railways. During January 2011, an Atkins-led consortium was selected to engineer a 180 km high speed line between the Danish capital of Copenhagen and the German border. In April 2019, the company was appointed to plan Sweden's first high speed main line.

In June 2011, Atkins announced it was buying the oil and gas business of Finnish global consulting firm Pöyry for €17.25 million; as a result of this acquisition, around 130 staff from Pöyry's Perth, Stavanger and Aberdeen offices integrated into Atkins' Energy business unit. During October 2014, Houston-based oil and gas offshore engineering business Houston Offshore Engineering was acquired for £45 million, added another 150 people to the business and increased the headcount of oil and gas specialists to over 1,000 within its operations worldwide. That same year, Atkins had made a bid to purchase Parsons Brinckerhoff from Balfour Beatty, but were outbid by WSP Global. In April 2016, the company announced the acquisition of the Projects, Products and Technology (PP&T) segment of EnergySolutions for £206 million, strengthening Atkins' nuclear multidisciplinary capability to a 2,000-strong global team.

During April 2017, Atkins received a £2.1bn bid from Canadian company SNC-Lavalin. On 21 April, it was announced that the takeover deal had been agreed; the move was approved by shareholders in June 2017. This step coincided with news of 92 redundancies in the company's infrastructure division. The deal was completed on 3 July 2017, with Atkins becoming SNC-Lavalin's fifth business sector. Atkins was delisted from the London Stock Exchange with effect from 4 July 2017.

During the COVID-19 pandemic in the United Kingdom, Atkins announced it was cutting around 280 jobs from its UK infrastructure division, blaming "unprecedented uncertainty" in the sector from which it did not expect to see a bounce back "in the short to medium term."

== Operations ==
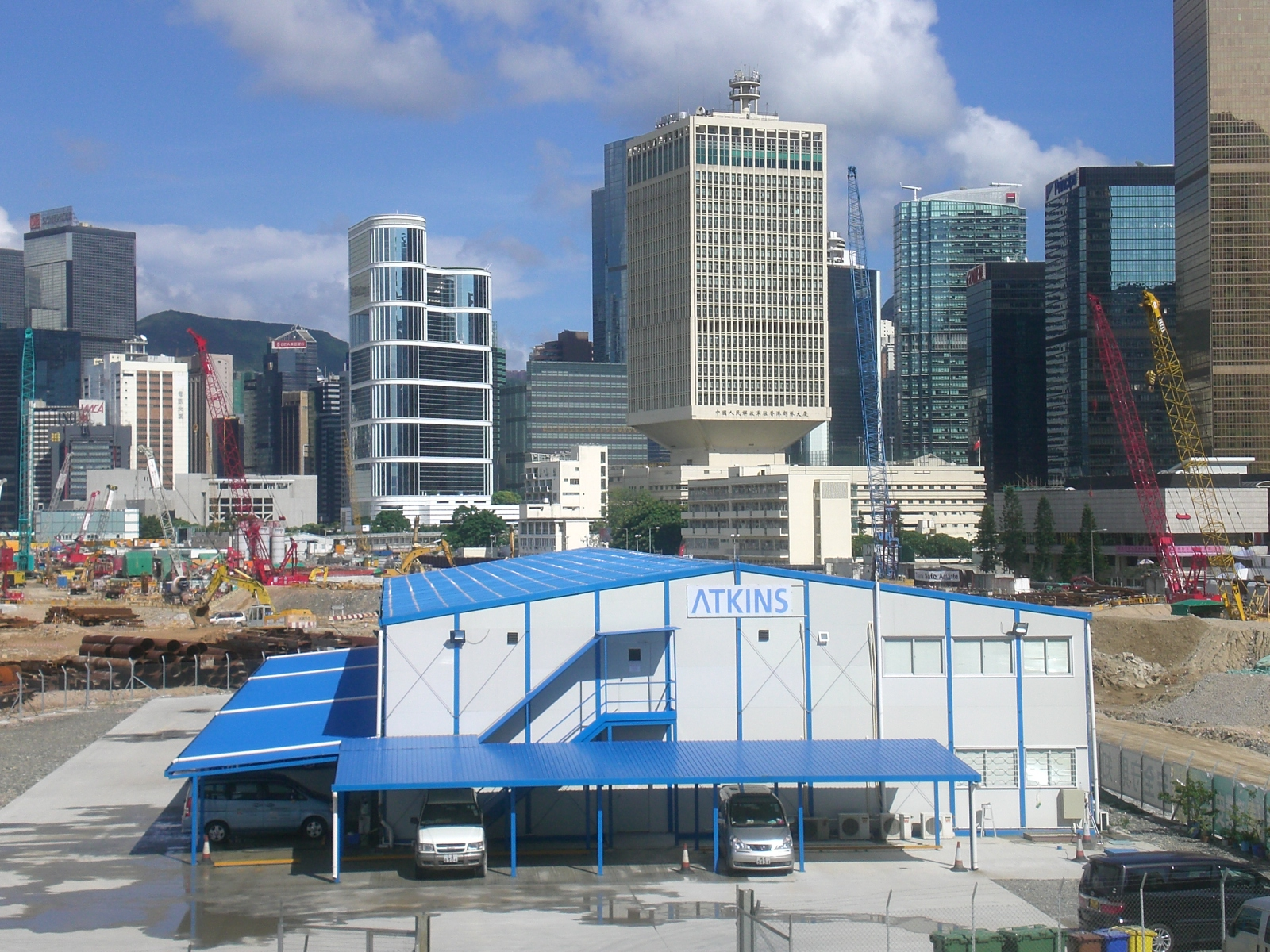
An Atkins' construction site house at a building site in Hong Kong.

Atkins provides engineering, design, business and digital consultancy services in various regions:

- United Kingdom: water, environment, education, aerospace, security, defence, communications, infrastructure design, urban planning and transportation planning
- North America: infrastructure planning, engineering, construction management, environmental consulting, urban planning, architecture and program management services
- Middle East: design, engineering and project management services for buildings, transportation and other infrastructure programs
- Asia Pacific: engineering, planning, urban design, architectural and rail design services
- Hong Kong: urban rail development

Atkins also has an Energy business providing engineering and project management services.

== Notable projects ==
The lobby of the Burj Al Arab hotel.

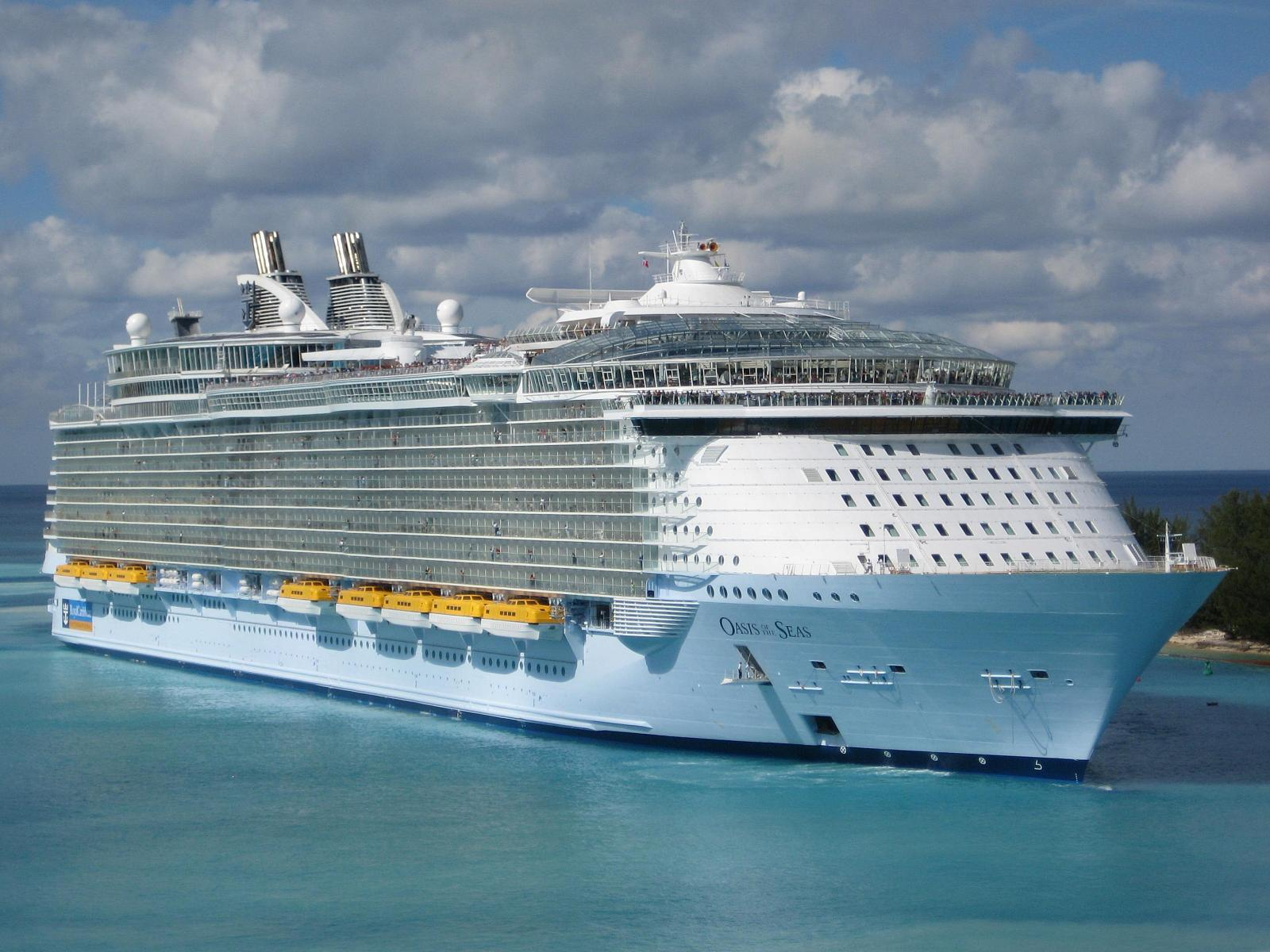
The MS Oasis of the Seas at anchor in Nassau, Bahamas.

Atkins' notable past and current projects include:

Asia Pacific

- Landmark 81, Ho Chi Minh City, Vietnam
- Gautrain rapid transit railway system, Gauteng Province, South Africa
- Jinji Hotel, China
- The Centaurus Islamabad, Pakistan
- LuLu International Shopping Mall, Kochi, India
- The Regatta, Jakarta, Indonesia
- Songjiang Shimao Hotel, China
- Tianjin World Financial Center, China
- Terminal area master plan and terminal building design for Yinchuan Hedong Airport, China
- Xi'an Xianyang International Airport terminal, China
- Airport terminal building design for the Trivandrum International Airport, India
- Thames Town, Songjiang, China (2006)
- Inpex Ichthys Project: Flow Assurance, Australia
- Varanus Island Compression Project, Australia
- Asia Aerospace City, Malaysia
- Baoneng Shenyang Global Financial Center, China

Europe (ex. United Kingdom)

- Architecture and design services for the Capital Fort mixed use development, Sofia, Bulgaria
- Baku White City, Azerbaijan
- Signaling and telecommunications work for the European Rail Traffic Management System (ERTMS), Denmark
- Rail network planning and design for the Mälaren Line project, Sweden
- Partnering with Assystem to develop offshore wind, wave, and tidal energy production, France
- M50 Motorway upgrade, Ireland

Middle East

- Asian Beach Games, Oman
- Bahrain World Trade Centre, Bahrain
- Burj Al Arab Dubai, United Arab Emirates
- DIFC Lighthouse Tower, United Arab Emirates
- DSEC Commercial Tower, United Arab Emirates
- Dubai Light Rail Transit, Dubai, United Arab Emirates
- Masterplanning and detailed design services for the Durrat Al Bahrain resort, Bahrain
- Extension of Masjid al-Haram, Saudi Arabia
- Makkah Metro, Saudi Arabia
- Lusail Light Rapid Transit, Doha, Qatar
- Abu Tubul Onshore Gas Plant Detailed Design, Oman
- The Address, United Arab Emirates

North America

- Engineering, design, ITS, planning, and program management services for Florida's Turnpike Enterprise toll and asset management systems, Florida
- Runway design and planning services for the Fort Lauderdale-Hollywood International Airport, Fort Lauderdale, Florida
- Construction and program management services for the Hoover Dam Bypass bridge project, Boulder City, Nevada
- Masterplanning, urban design, and sustainability services for the Hunters Point Shipyard/Candlestick Point Urban Plan, San Francisco, California
- Program management and construction services for the Little Patuxent Water Reclamation Plant, Howard County, Maryland
- Construction, design, and program management services for the MARTA bus and rail transit system, Georgia
- Architecture, A/E, and construction services for the Miami Dade College Culinary Institute, Miami, Florida
- Oasis of the Seas Cruise Liner, Fort Lauderdale, Florida
- Ecological, environmental, and program management services for the Post-Hurricane Katrina Storm Damage Risk Reduction Program, Louisiana
- Construction management services for the upgrading of the Statue of Liberty, New York, New York
- Architecture, A/E, and construction services for the Texas A&M International University Student Success Center, Laredo, Texas
- Architecture, A/E, and geomatic services for The Wizarding World of Harry Potter, Orlando, Florida
- Project management and cost estimating for the construction of the World Trade Center Memorial and Visitors Center, New York, New York

United Kingdom

- Planning and infrastructure support for the Queen Elizabeth Olympic Park
- Wing design and analysis for the Airbus A350 XWB aircraft
- Bay Pointe Cardiff
- Birmingham New Street Station redevelopment
- Design for The Bulwell Academy, Bulwell, Nottingham
- Highways management services for Cambridgeshire County Council
- Coed Darcy Sustainable Village
- Local transport planning policy evaluation for the Department for Transport
- Future Rapid Effect System armoured fighting vehicle programme
- Design, engineering and planning consultancy for the Glasgow Airport Rail Link
- Managing Agent for HBOS's property portfolio
- Newport railway station
- Oxford Circus Diagonal Crossing, London
