= Ron Dennis =

British businessman and motorsport executive (born 1947)

Sir Ron Dennis CBE
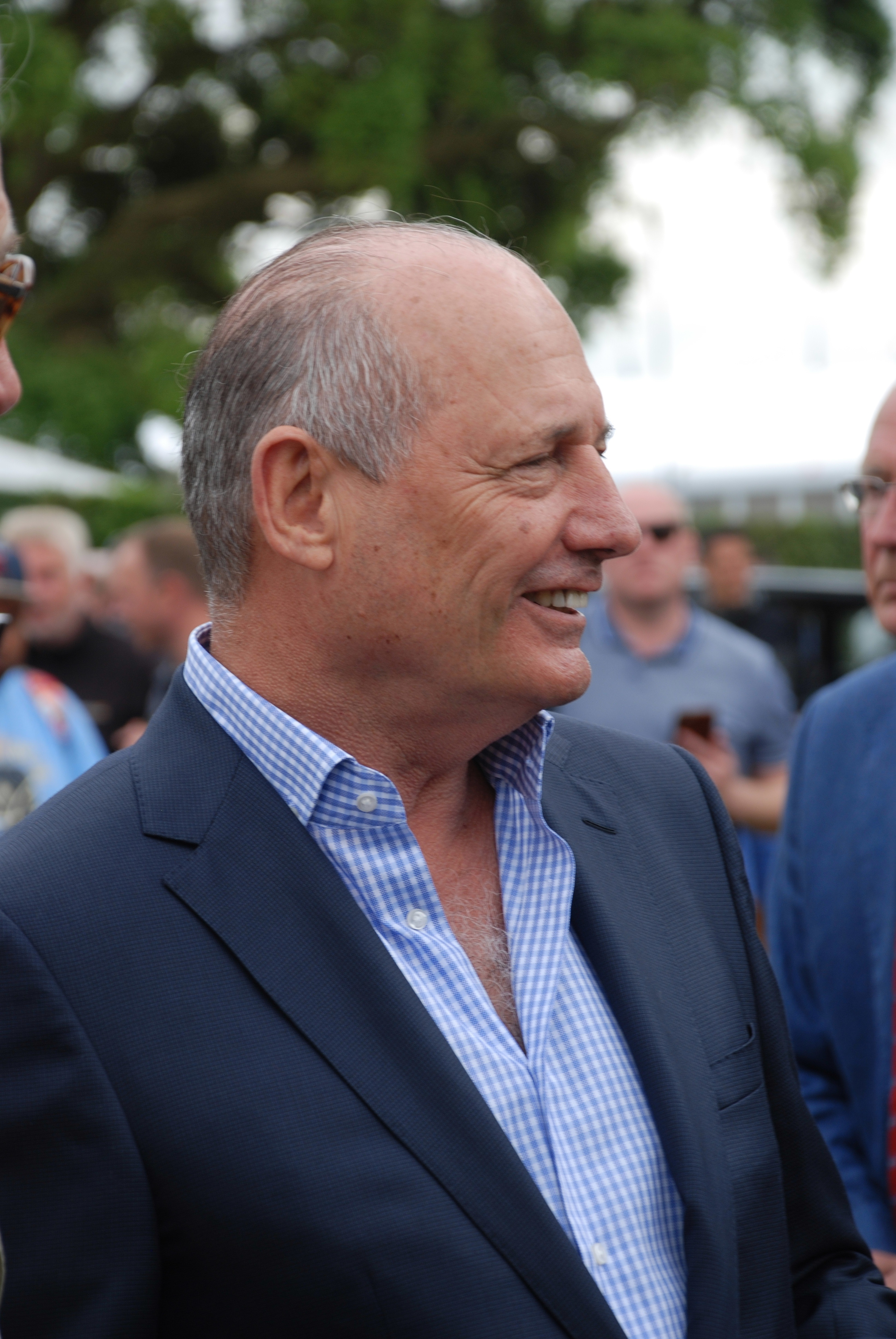
- Dennis in 2016

British Business Ambassador for Manufacturing / Advanced Engineering
- In office 2010 – 3 January 2019 Serving with Richard Olver and Robin Southwell
- Prime Minister: David Cameron; Theresa May
- Preceded by: Office established
- Succeeded by: Office abolished

Non-Executive Director for Science, Innovation and Technology
- In office 22 April 2023 – 21 April 2024 Serving with Alison Wolf, Tim Peake and Melissa Di Donato
- Prime Minister: Rishi Sunak
- Preceded by: Office established

Personal details
- Born: Ronald Dennis; 1 June 1947 (age 79) Woking, Surrey, England
- Party: Conservative
- Spouse: Lisa (m. 1986; div. 2008)
- Children: 3
- Education: Guildford Technical College
- Occupation: Businessman; motorsport executive
- Employer: European Formula Two; Rondel (1971–1973); Project Four (1976–1980); Formula One; Cooper (1966–1968); Brabham (1968–1970); McLaren (1981–2008)
- Title: Team Principal
- Known for: Founder and CEO of McLaren Group (1985–2009, 2014–2017); Co-owner of TAG Heuer (1985–1999); Founder of Absolute Taste (1998–present); Founder and chairman of McLaren Automotive (2010–2017); Member of the DEIAP for the Ministry of Defence (2017)

Sir Ronald Dennis (born 1 June 1947) is a British businessman and motorsport executive. From 1981 to 2009, Dennis served as team principal, CEO and co-owner of McLaren in Formula One, winning seven World Constructors' Championship titles between 1984 and 1998; he also served as founder, chairman and owner of McLaren Group between 1985 and 2017, where he founded McLaren Automotive in 2010. (Note: McLaren Automotive previously existed as McLaren Cars, which was founded by Dennis in 1985.)

Dennis started his career as a mechanic, before starting successful junior formulae teams Rondel Racing and then Project Four Racing, which took over the management of the McLaren team in 1980. Between 1981 and 2009, Dennis was the team principal of the McLaren Formula One team, and was instrumental in transforming the outfit into a regular world championship contender. Constructors' and drivers' world championships were won with Niki Lauda, Alain Prost, Ayrton Senna, Mika Häkkinen and Lewis Hamilton.

Dennis founded McLaren Cars—later known as McLaren Automotive—in 1985, producing flagship supercars such as the F1 (1992), SLR (2003, in collaboration with Mercedes-Benz) and P1 (2013). Aside from McLaren Group, he is also one of six British business persons to be an official British Business Ambassador for advanced engineering and manufacturing. Dennis is also a main trustee for Tommy's, a miscarriage help charity. He is the Global Consultant for the state-owned China Minsheng Investment Group, the chairman for the UK Summit, and also former owner of Absolute Taste. With interests in foreign trade, Dennis also became Chairman of the British East Asian Council in 2014. Before the merger with LVMH, Dennis was a major shareholder in the luxury watch maker TAG Heuer, along with his business partner, Mansour Ojjeh.

== Early life ==
Dennis was born and raised in Woking, England, and studied motor vehicle engineering at Guildford Technical College. He began working for the Cooper Formula One team in 1966 as a mechanic at the age of 18 where he worked alongside lead driver Jochen Rindt. In 1968 Rindt moved to Brabham and took Dennis with him. For the 1969 season Rindt moved to Team Lotus; however, Dennis stayed on, choosing instead to work for Sir Jack Brabham.

When Brabham chose retirement in 1971, Dennis and his colleague Neil Trundle decided to start their own team. In 1971, Rondel Racing was founded in Dennis's native Woking. Money was at a premium though and Dennis was trying to find sponsorship. Through Ron's then girlfriend, who was the daughter of John Phelps, director of Phelps Antique Furniture in Twickenham, one of its regular customers Tony Vlassopulos, a barrister son of a Greek shipowner, was asked to sponsor Rondel. Vlassopulos asked his friend Ken Grob, chairman of Alexander Howden, insurance brokers in London if he was interested in joining in. Grob said yes on the proviso that his young son Ian Grob could be part of the team, which was agreed. From that moment forward, Vlassopulos became Dennis' first sponsor.

By the mid-1970s, the team was enjoying considerable success in Formula Two. Rondel aspired to be more than a customer team, however, and Dennis soon managed to find an additional backer to Grob and Vlassopulos in Motul, to help fund a Rondel F1 car. For 1974, a Ray Jessop-designed F1 car was planned but the energy crisis affected Motul's backing. Ultimately Dennis was unable to obtain sufficient funds to support the F1 venture, so Trundle continued with the Jessop-designed car while Vlassopulos and Grob took over ownership of the team, renamed Token Racing.

Dennis regrouped, forming a Marlboro-backed F2 team for two talented and well-sponsored drivers from Ecuador. In 1975 Dennis founded the Project Three team, and his cars once again became race winners. In 1976 Dennis founded Project Four Racing. This team went on to great success in Formula 2 and Formula 3, winning championships in 1979 and 1980 with Philip Morris (Marlboro) backing. Project Four also participated in the build programme for Procar BMW M1 racing cars. As his business interests became increasingly successful and lucrative, Dennis aspired to return to Formula One, hiring talented designer John Barnard to spearhead the design and development of an innovative new F1 car.

Dennis's return to Formula One was well-timed. The recent poor performance of the former world championship-winning McLaren team had prompted Philip Morris executive John Hogan to initiate a takeover of the outfit by Dennis' Project Four. Effectively a reverse takeover, the team was rebranded as McLaren International with Dennis in control. In addition to hiring Barnard to begin work on the team's revolutionary new carbon fibre composite chassis, the MP4/1, Dennis also successfully recruited the Porsche automobile firm to build the cars' engines from 1984-87.

The 'MP4' designation originally stood for Marlboro Project Four (the MP4/1 design was complete before the merger). After the change of title sponsor in 1997, the same abbreviation was retained, with the 'M' now standing for McLaren. The numbering system was retained until 2017 when it was replaced with 'MCL' following Dennis' departure.

== Building McLaren ==
=== The 1980s ===
Prior to Dennis's arrival at McLaren in September 1980, the team was going through a particularly uncompetitive stint. The team had last won a grand prix with then defending World Champion James Hunt in 1977 and had finished a lowly ninth in the 1980 constructors' championship with John Watson and Alain Prost. Even in those early days Dennis recognised the young Frenchman's potential but was unable to prevent him moving to the Renault team for 1981, a season that saw McLaren once again winning races. The year also saw many other teams struggling to duplicate Barnard's revolutionary carbon-fibre chassis.

In 1981, Dennis and his business partners bought out the other McLaren shareholders, Teddy Mayer and Tyler Alexander. In 1983 Dennis persuaded then-Williams backer Mansour Ojjeh to become a partner in McLaren International. Ojjeh invested in Porsche-built turbocharged engines which carried the name of his company, Techniques d'Avant Garde (TAG).

Dennis then persuaded the retired Niki Lauda to return to Formula One for the 1982 season and at the season opening South African Grand Prix the double World Champion lined up alongside Watson at the start of the season (only after an F1 drivers strike was averted). By the end of the year both drivers had secured two victories and 1983 began with more success with Watson's win in Long Beach. No more victories followed that year but Lauda debuted the Porsche-powered MP4-1E interim chassis at that season's Dutch Grand Prix. By the following race, the Italian Grand Prix, both cars were powered by turbocharged engines: McLaren-Ford had become McLaren-TAG. Convinced by his initial investment, Ojjeh became the major investor in McLaren, taking 60 percent of the shares. By the end of the year, Alain Prost, who had finished second in the 1983 Drivers' Championship with Renault but was fired after publicly criticising the team following the loss of both the Drivers' and Constructors Championships, had been signed to replace Watson. With the experienced Lauda at his side, everything was set for a title challenge in 1984.

In just four years, Dennis had turned McLaren from an also-ran team into a front-runner and in 1984, with Barnard's revolutionary MP4/2 car his work was rewarded with 12 wins from 16 races and both drivers' and constructors' titles. Lauda took the drivers' crown by a half-point from his McLaren teammate Prost, with both drivers scoring more than double the tally of the third-placed Elio de Angelis. While neither Lauda nor Prost were the fastest combination of the year, that title going to reigning World Champion Nelson Piquet in his BMW powered Brabham BT53 who claimed 9 pole positions, the McLaren-TAG's reliability was unmatched. As said by Clive James in commentary on the official video review of the Formula One season produced by FOCA: "Anything as fast as the McLarens fell apart, anything as reliable finished later." The following year the situation was reversed and Prost won his first World Championship while Lauda suffered multiple failures and only won one race. At his home race in Austria Lauda announced his permanent retirement from Formula One at the end of the season. McLaren finished eight points ahead of second placed Ferrari that year but the pack was closing and in 1986, McLaren lost out to Williams, although the consistent Prost won the drivers' title. Lauda's replacement was the 1982 World Champion Keke Rosberg, who also retired from Formula One at the end of the 1986 season.

Dennis signed Stefan Johansson from Ferrari for the 1987 season to partner Prost, but it was clear that the TAG engine was no longer competitive in the face of increased manufacturer involvement, and so Dennis approached Honda, who were at the time supplying rivals Williams and Lotus. Williams' unwillingness to accept a Japanese driver (Satoru Nakajima) in place of Nigel Mansell, as well as their displeasure with Williams team management for losing the 1986 drivers' title, led Honda to transfer their engine supply to the McLaren team. Dennis made no secret that Johansson's seat was only temporary as his intention had been to sign the Brazilian Ayrton Senna (who had developed a close relationship with Honda while at Lotus in 1987) to partner double champion Prost. Senna was under contract with Lotus for 1987 but Dennis got his man and midway through the year it was announced that Senna would be joining the team, along with Honda, for three years from 1988.

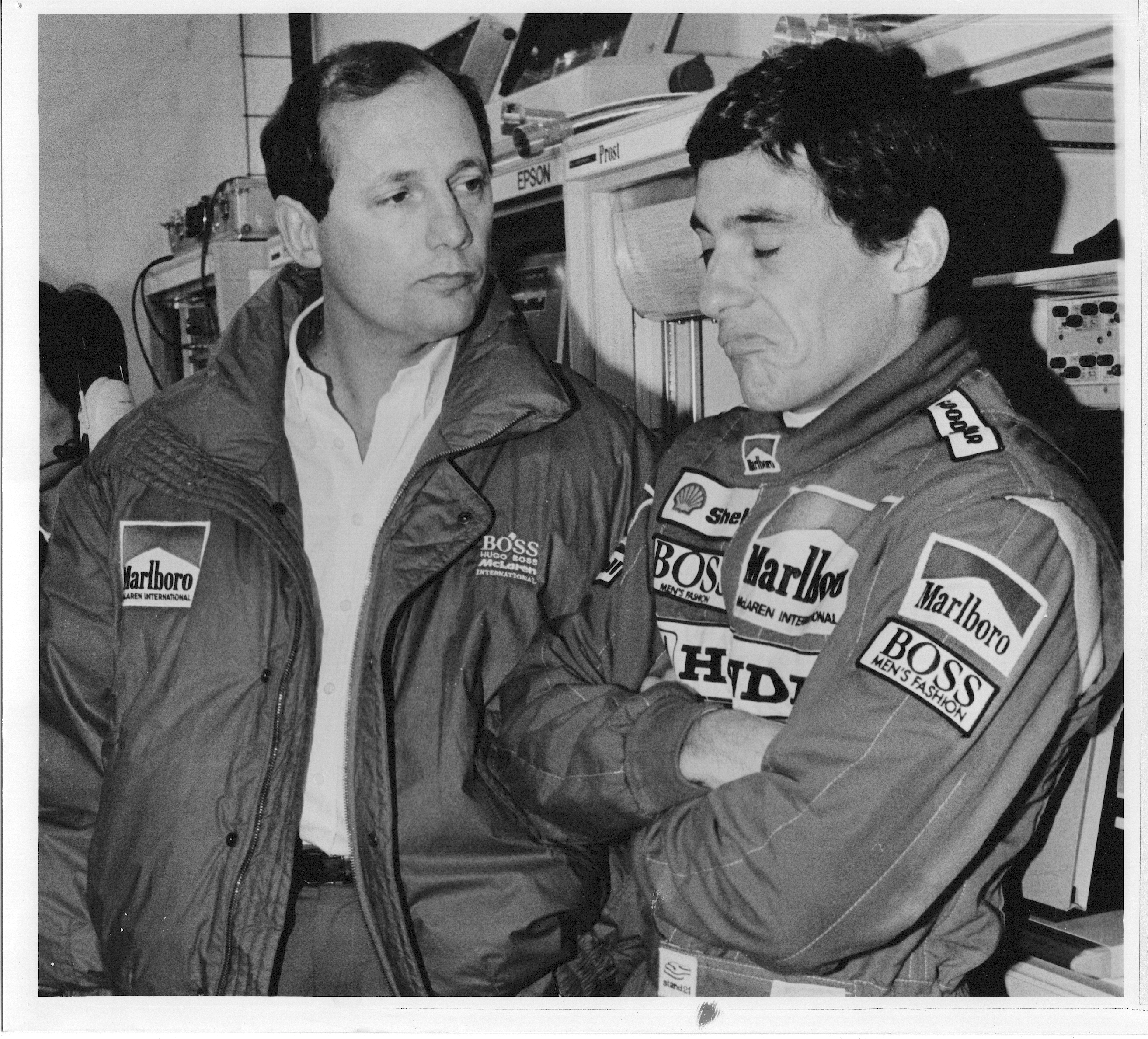
McLaren team chief Ron Dennis (left) and Brazilian driver Ayrton Senna discuss the practice results at the pits during the 1988 Hungarian Grand Prix at the Hungaroring race track in Budapest on August 5, 1988. Senna was placed 5th after clocking 1:30.422.

In 1988, McLaren was dominant, winning 15 of the 16 races and taking 15 of the 16 pole positions, and both the drivers' and constructors' titles with no real opposition. The team won the Constructors Championship with a then-record 199 points, 134 in front of second-placed Ferrari while Senna won his first World Championship by three points from Prost (Senna won 8 races to Prost's 7). Dennis had to manage the tension between his drivers. On the second lap of the Portuguese Grand Prix, Senna almost forced Prost into the pit wall at high speed as the Frenchman passed him and took control of the race, Prost going on to win while Senna could only finish sixth. The two had words about the incident after the race.

By mid-1989, it was becoming impossible to pacify the two warring drivers. Following a fall out in the aftermath of a broken promise between them at San Marino where Prost and Senna agreed before the race that whoever got to the first corner in front would not be challenged into that turn. After the restart following Gerhard Berger's crash, Senna outbraked Prost going into the Tosa turn and broke the agreement, something which angered Prost. Senna later denied making the agreement but Prost was backed up by Marlboro's John Hogan who had been with the drivers when the agreement was made. The result was that the two barely talked for the rest of the season. Prost angered Dennis when not only did he announce that he would be joining Ferrari for 1990, thus ending a highly successful six-year stint with McLaren, but also with his public comments about the team and Honda allegedly favoring Senna at the Italian Grand Prix. Dennis then showed his anger in public after Prost, who won the race following an engine failure for Senna, dropped his winners trophy from the podium to the Tifosi showing how unhappy he was despite the win. Dennis flung the Constructors winners trophy at Prost's feet and walked off the podium. The "cold war" between the drivers came to a head at the Japanese Grand Prix when, at Honda's home track, Prost and Senna had their infamous collision while fighting for the lead late in the race which took Prost out and led to Senna's disqualification and gave Prost his third World Championship.

It was Prost's actions with the winners trophy in Italy in 1989 that broke Dennis's rule that McLaren had ownership of all trophies won by the team and its drivers, with the drivers free to have replicas made of their race-winning trophies for their own collections if they so desired.

=== The 1990s ===
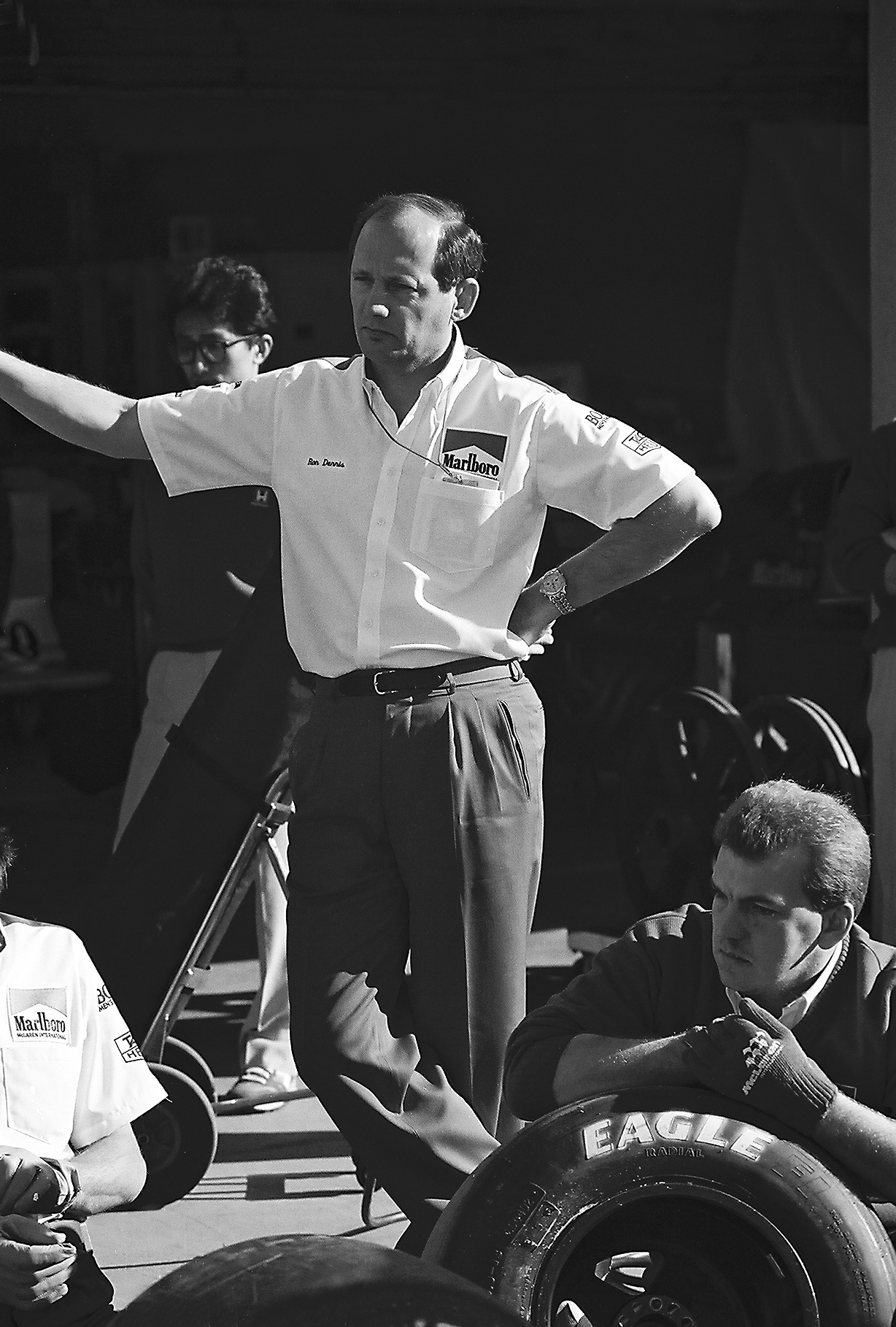
Dennis at the 1991 United States Grand Prix at the Phoenix street circuit.

At the start of the 1990s, McLaren continued to dominate the sport with Ayrton Senna taking back-to-back titles in 1990 and 1991. McLaren signed the promising newcomer Mika Häkkinen as a test driver at the end of 1992, but by 1992 Williams was once more in the ascendancy. McLaren was not to win another title for seven years. With the loss of Honda power in 1993, Dennis was left haggling with Ford and Ford's works team Benetton for a supply of competitive engines. A disappointing partnership with Peugeot in 1994 failed to yield the expected results and left Dennis searching to find a fourth engine partner in as many years. In October 1994, he agreed terms with Mercedes-Benz to supply engines from 1995 onwards, an association that continued until 2014.

The first couple of seasons the McLaren-Mercedes relationship was difficult, teething troubles with the engine, chassis challenges, and the driver for 1995 was the ageing Nigel Mansell who did not even fit into the car so Mark Blundell deputised. When a revised chassis was produced Mansell's performances were not successful. Mika Häkkinen gradually assumed leadership of the team but suffered severe head injuries in a crash at the end of the 1995 season, from which he eventually made a complete recovery.

By the mid-1990s, Dennis was once more guiding his team towards domination of the sport, and in 1996 he approached Williams's star designer Adrian Newey to become technical director of McLaren. Newey agreed, and in 1998 McLaren took both the drivers' and the constructors' titles with Mika Häkkinen. A second drivers' title followed in 1999, but Ferrari took the constructors' title.

=== The 2000s ===
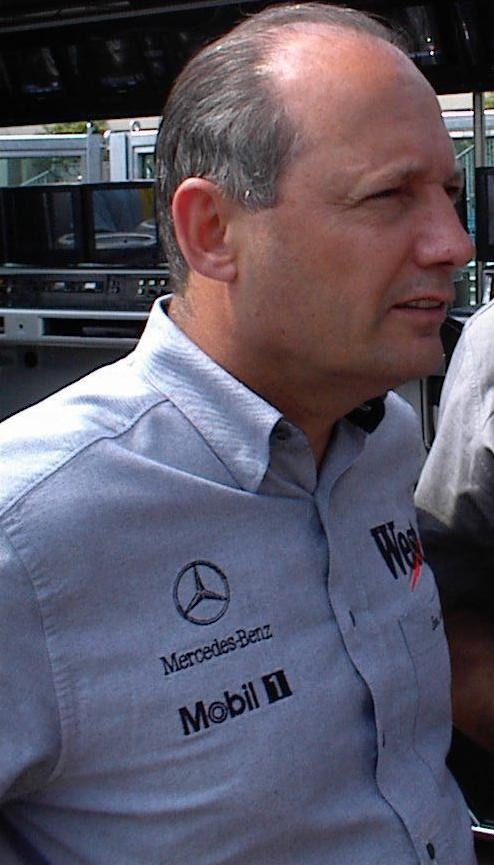
Ron Dennis at the 2000 Monaco Grand Prix.

In 2000, Dennis was made a Commander of the Most Excellent Order of the British Empire.

In 2001, Jaguar boss Bobby Rahal attempted to lure Newey from McLaren. Details of how Dennis convinced Newey to stay have remained vague but rumours in the specialist motor racing press suggested a deal allowing the designer to work on racing yachts. In the same year, team leader Mika Häkkinen announced that he was to leave the sport. As a result, Dennis signed Kimi Räikkönen.

In 2005, McLaren returned to the top of the sport following a poor year in 2004. Despite producing their strongest performance for several years and winning more grands prix than any of their rivals, McLaren were narrowly beaten in both championships by the Renault F1 team. A further blow was the announcement that Adrian Newey was to join Red Bull Racing from the start of 2006. In December 2005, McLaren announced a title sponsorship deal with Vodafone estimated to be worth £500 million and the signing of World Champion Fernando Alonso, both to begin in 2007. In the interim, McLaren had a difficult 2006 season, failing to win a race for the first time since the 1996 season. Halfway through the 2006 season, McLaren gave up on perfecting their current car and the team focused on the 2007 MP4-22 car.

The start of the 2007 season saw McLaren a strong challenger for the world championships, with both Fernando Alonso and Lewis Hamilton in contention for the drivers' championship. However, throughout the season the team suffered from the in-fighting between Alonso and Hamilton; Dennis always advocated treating his two drivers equally, however after the Chinese Grand Prix, he said "We weren't racing Kimi, we were basically racing Fernando." The Times said his comments "made a nonsense of his claims to be treating his drivers equitably in the World Championship run-in" but the team's insistence on parity until the very final race in Brazil underlined Dennis's core philosophy even if it ultimately lost the team the world championship. The season was also notable for the 2007 Formula One espionage controversy, where the team was judged to have been complicit in the theft and use of Ferrari intellectual property, fined a record $100 million by the FIA, and stripped of all constructor championship points for the season.

The 2008 season saw Alonso leave McLaren to return to Renault with Renault driver Heikki Kovalainen replacing Alonso. 2008 would see McLaren fight Ferrari and BMW Sauber for both world championships with McLaren finishing second in the constructors championship, 21 points behind Ferrari and McLaren driver Lewis Hamilton dramatically winning the drivers championship (Mclaren's first drivers title since 1999, their 12th overall title and the 10th won under Dennis) by one point over Ferrari's Felipe Massa after passing Toyota's Timo Glock on the last lap at the season finale in Brazil. Following the 2008 season, Dennis stepped down as team principal of McLaren handing the reigns over to Martin Whitmarsh but he remained as CEO of the McLaren Group and took a new role in McLaren Automotive.

=== Final years at McLaren ===
Dennis initially owned all of McLaren after buying out the original shareholders after Bruce McLaren's death. In 1983, he offered Mansour Ojjeh the chance to purchase 50% of the team, with McLaren becoming a joint venture with Ojjeh's TAG Group. In 2000, after supplying engines to the team through its Mercedes subsidiary for five years, DaimlerChrysler AG (now Mercedes-Benz Group AG) exercised an option to buy 40% of the TAG McLaren Group. Dennis and Ojjeh each retained a 30% share.

In August 2006, it was reported that Daimler was considering acquiring the remaining 60% of the McLaren Group. However, it was announced in January 2007 that the Mumtalakat Holding Company (the sovereign wealth fund of the Kingdom of Bahrain) had purchased 15% each from both Dennis and Ojjeh. In November 2009, Mercedes bought Brawn GP (renaming it Mercedes GP) and announced that McLaren would buy back Daimler's 40% share of the group over a period of two years. The shares were divided evenly between the remaining shareholders, with the Mumtalakat Holding Company owning 50% and Dennis and Ojjeh each owning 25%.

Dennis had stepped down as CEO/Team Principal of McLaren in 2009, handing over the reigns to Martin Whitmarsh, but returned to his post in 2014 under the condition that he would seek investment to take a controlling interest in the company. His attempts to do so ultimately failed. BBC Sport reports that Dennis' relationship with Ojjeh became difficult as early as 2013, culminating in a meeting in October 2016 where Ojjeh discussed Dennis' exit from McLaren. In November 2016, Dennis lost a court case against his fellow shareholders that saw him suspended from his position as chairman. Dennis' contract with McLaren expired in January 2017, and in June 2017 it was announced that he had agreed to sell his remaining shares in both the McLaren Technology Group and McLaren Automotive.

== Other businesses ==
Dennis has held shares and founded numerous companies other than his major commitment, McLaren Technology Group. In 1998 he co-founded Absolute Taste. Absolute Taste was acquired by One Event Management in December 2016.

Until 2019, Dennis was a business ambassador for the UK Government, working for The Department of International Trade. Dennis also holds the role as Global Adviser for Chinese investment group, Minsheng Investment.

Mansour Ojjeh and TAG Group purchased luxury watchmaker, Heuer, forming the present TAG Heuer. Ojjeh sold a significant stake in the business to Dennis, and both business partners sold the watchmaker in 1999 to LVMH.

In 2007, Dennis founded a charity, Dreamchasing, which aims to "help young people achieve their aspirations and, through their successes, to become inspirational role models for others". His charity's first operation was a sponsorship programme for families in Ethiopia, which, supporting the Fida International charity, has assisted over 40 families out of poverty, additionally paying education costs to some.

== Communication style ==
"Ronspeak" is the term coined for the style of speech used by Dennis, and has become a well-used phrase in the F1 paddock to describe sentences of unneeded complexity; Dennis is renowned for his verbose, evasive and cautious answers to questions from Formula One journalists.

While acknowledging that the term has been used to criticise Dennis, the former editor-in-chief of F1 Racing, Matt Bishop, argues that "Ronspeak" is not a vice; rather, it is informative and accurate. Dennis, in describing Fernando Alonso's contribution to the McLaren team's development, said his experience and ability "[prevented] an F1 team from going down [time wasting] technical cul-de-sacs – and as a result, car-developmental progress becomes more linear." Bishop described this as a prime example of Ronspeak, hailing it as "logical, informative and insightful. [But also] careful ... in that what it doesn't do is compare Alonso's exceptional all-round ability with that of his predecessors."

== Personal life ==
On 15 February 2008, Dennis announced his separation and later divorce from his wife of 22 years, Lisa, with whom he has three children.

In March 2011, Dennis was banned from driving for six months after accumulation of points.

He is a Conservative Party donor. In the period between 22 April 2005 and 16 June 2011 the Conservative Party accepted £126,200 in donations from Ron Dennis. During the 2015 United Kingdom general election campaign, Dennis was a signatory to a letter to The Daily Telegraph which praised the party's economic policies and claimed that "a change in course will threaten jobs and deter investment".

In May 2019, Dennis ranked 304th on the Sunday Times Rich List with an estimated wealth of £450 million.

== Awards and honours ==
- 1996 De Montfort University Honorary Doctorate
- 1997 City University London Honorary Doctorate
- 2000 Commander of the Most Excellent Order of the British Empire for services to motorsport.
- 2000 University of Surrey Honorary Doctorate
- 2001 British Racing Drivers' Club Gold Medal
- 2007 British Racing Drivers' Club Colin Chapman Trophy.
- 2008 British Racing Drivers' Club Gold Medal
- 2008 Royal Academy of Engineering Prince Philip Medal
- 2009 Guild of Motoring Writers's President's Trophy
- 2013 University of Bath Honorary Doctorate
- 2017 American Academy of Achievement's Golden Plate Award

In the 2024 New Year Honours Dennis was appointed Knight Bachelor for services to industry and to charity.
