= FiReControl =

Abandoned UK emergency services project

FiReControl was a project, initiated in the United Kingdom in March 2004, to reduce the number of control rooms used to handle emergency calls for fire services and authorities. Presently there are 46 control rooms in England that handle calls from the local public for emergency assistance via the 999 system. A new radio network – FireLink – is being developed and built that will be compatible with FiReControl.

The original plan was for 46 current control rooms to be combined into nine regional control centres (RCC), but this plan was thrown into doubt in May 2010 when the government announced that fire services would not be forced to reorganise. The plan was formally scrapped in December 2010.

== Prior arrangements in existing control rooms ==
At the time that FiReControl was proposed, each fire and rescue service in England was responsible for accepting and processing emergency fire calls in its own local authority area and, with agreement, emergency calls from other fire and rescue service areas. These were answered by dedicated fire control staff who used computer-aided mobilising systems to locate the nearest available, appropriate resources and mobilise them to the incident. The control staff maintained contact with the fire crews, in most cases by voice radio, whilst on their way and during the incident to provide current information and respond to critical requests.

Some fire and rescue services supported each other with additional resources. Although the control rooms relied on different technologies and operational procedures and were not physically networked, they supported each other by taking calls and giving advice to callers from outside their area. Then the information was passed to the relevant fire service via telephone, fax or radio, whichever was quickest. There were at the time about 1,500 control staff employed in England, with 350 on duty at any one time under the current county system.

== Proposed arrangements in regional control centres ==
The regional control centres were expected to improve on the existing arrangements by:

- Networking each of the nine centres so they will be able to automatically back each other up in times of increased call pressure or failure.
- Providing purpose built, secure and resilient modern facilities.
- Ensuring each RCC will have access to the same information and the ability to manage and deploy resources on a local, regional or national level.
- Providing each RCC with caller identification location technology – which means the location a call is coming from will be identified automatically.
- Providing satellite positioning equipment – which will monitor the whereabouts of each vehicle.
- Mobile data terminals – will be installed in cabs so firefighters have constantly updated information.
- Rationalise mobilising policies and procedures across all existing Fire and Rescue Services in England.

However much of the technology was said to be becoming obsolete before it had even been installed due to progress in technology and delays to the project. Some fire services already had some of the proposed equipment some three years before the final RCC goes live.

In support of the new control rooms an additional government project called FireLink was initiated to deliver a new digital radio system Airwave.

=== Delivering the technology ===
In March 2007, then fire and rescue service minister Angela Smith announced that EADS (now Airbus Defence & Space) had been awarded an eight-year £200 million contract to supply the IT infrastructure for the RCCs.

=== Regions and locations of proposed regional control centres ===
Region	Location	Control rooms proposed to be replaced	Original planned cutover date	Reference
East of England (EoE)	Cambridge Research Park, Cambridge	Essex, Norfolk, Cambridge and Peterborough, Hertfordshire, Bedfordshire and Luton and Suffolk Fire and Rescue Services.	September 2011 – May 2012	
East Midlands (EM)	Willow Farm Business Park, Castle Donington, Leicestershire	Derbyshire, Leicestershire, Nottinghamshire, Lincolnshire, and Northamptonshire Fire and Rescue Services.	May 2011 – January 2012	
London	Merton Industrial Estate, London	London Fire Brigade	September 2011	
North East (NE)	Belmont Business Park, Durham	Durham and Darlington, Tyne and Wear, Cleveland and Northumberland.	May 2011 – November 2011	
North West (NW)	Lingley Mere Business Park, Warrington	Cumbria, Cheshire, Lancashire, Greater Manchester and Merseyside Fire and Rescue Services.	January 2012 – May 2012	
South East (SE)	Kite's Croft, Fareham, Hampshire	Hampshire, Royal Berkshire, Oxfordshire, Kent, East Sussex, Buckinghamshire, Isle of Wight, Surrey and West Sussex Fire and Rescue Services.	March 2012 – November 2012	
South West (SW)	Blackbrook Business Park, Taunton	Devon and Somerset, Dorset, Avon, Cornwall, Wiltshire and Gloucestershire Fire and Rescue Services.	May 2011 – March 2012	
West Midlands (WM)	Wolverhampton Business Park, Wolverhampton	Staffordshire, West Midlands, Shropshire, Hereford and Worcester and Warwickshire Fire and Rescue Services.	May 2011 – March 2012	
Yorkshire and Humberside (YH)	Paragon Business Village, Wakefield	West Yorkshire, South Yorkshire, Humberside and North Yorkshire Fire and Rescue Services.	July 2012 – November 2012	

=== Cut over to regional control centres ===
Cut over was planned to happen gradually with groups of fire and rescue services moving from local control centre to RCC in batches. This was intended to make it easier to identify, isolate and address any problems that arise without affecting the quality of service provided to the public. It was planned that the first regional control centres would go live in spring 2011, with the full system expected in place by the end of 2012, but the May 2010 announcements put these plans in doubt.

=== Management of regional control centres ===
Each RCC would have been run by an organisation known as a local authority controlled company. This company was to be jointly owned by all the fire and rescue authorities (FRAs) in that region.

By 2008, regional local authority controlled companies had been set up in the North East, North West, East Midlands, West Midlands, South West and the South East. London did not need to set up a local authority controlled company because of its unique arrangements.

== Select committee ==
On 8 February 2010, the Communities and Local Government Select Committee of the House of Commons heard evidence on the project. Called to give evidence were Cllr Brian Coleman and Cllr James Pearson from the Local Government Association. Also giving evidence Matt Wrack from the Fire Brigades Union and John Bonney Chief Fire Officers Association. The second session heard evidence from Shahid Malik MP Fire Minister, Sir Ken Knight Chief Fire and Rescue Adviser, Shona Dunn Director for Fire and Resilience Department for Communities and Local Government, Robin Southwell CEO and Roger Diggle Project Director, EADS. The committee was chaired by Dr Phyllis Starkey MP and attracted significant media attention.

== Opposition ==
The Fire Brigades Union, which represents firefighting personnel and control staff at all levels within the fire and rescue service across the UK, launched a campaign against the regionalisation of emergency fire control rooms. The union stated that the project had virtually no acceptance amongst the workforce, which was of major concern to the directors and ministers. Members of the fire brigades union had grave concerns about the diversion of money to the project, and questioned the feasibility of having 30% fewer control staff available to answer emergency calls across the country during spate conditions. There were fears that the regional control centre 999 system would become swamped with calls and come to a complete standstill, and the loss of local knowledge amongst call takers was considered a significant risk. Chief fire officers feared they would have less control over service delivery in their county, which they felt might be a concern to fire authorities around the country.

The Conservative Party published a policy green paper in April saying that they would cancel the regionalisation of fire control as part of their decentralisation/localisation policy, and confirmed following the 2010 general election that forced reorganisation was to be abandoned. In December 2010, the programme was officially scrapped.
