= FireLink =

UK fire service communications system

Firelink or FireLink is a wide area radio system in England, Wales, and Scotland for fire services. The system which supports both voice and data communication was designed to replace a patchwork of analogue systems with a modern wider area digital system. It provides new functionality – notably resilience and interoperability with other FRS and emergency services - which previous major incidents have identified as important.

Firelink enables fire appliances to be mobilised in response to a 999 call by voice and data in Scotland, Wales, and London. It became operational in Scotland and Wales in 2010. In the rest of England, mobilisation will be by voice only, as the FiReControl project to provide new emergency control rooms using Firelink was cancelled in 2010.

The key benefits of Firelink include more effective and safer service delivery through clearer voice communication and call group management for incident mobilisation and management; the ability to send data and status codes to/from mobile vehicles – a faster/more accurate medium than voice communication; and, in Wales, Scotland and London, the ability to identify and mobilise the nearest available appliance through an automated vehicle location (AVL) system. As a single comms system operating with standardised equipment across all 57 fire and rescue services across Great Britain, the system will also enhance the services' ability to respond collectively to major incidents by allowing fire and rescue appliances supporting major incidents the ability to speak directly to the control room managing the incident (where ever it may be). Finally, the system is also more resilient and secure and offers inter-interoperability with other blue lights services.

The system was developed and built by Airwave Solutions, it will be part of the Airwave private digital network. It is a private, digital, secure, Terrestrial Trunked Radio (TETRA) network, and will replace the many different existing networks commissioned by individual fire and rescue services.

In England, the project is part of CLG's fire resilience programme, which also includes the New Dimension programme and FiReControl projects. The New Dimension project has already delivered a range of equipment to the FRS to assist with handling large-scale incidents. The vehicles supplied as part of the New Dimension provision were fitted with the new Firelink digital radios.

== See also ==
- Fire services in the United Kingdom
- MetCC
- Gold–silver–bronze command structure
