= William Sydney Atkins =

Sir William Sydney Albert Atkins CBE (6 February 1902 – 15 August 1989) was the founder of Atkins, a large British engineering consultancy.

== Life ==
Born in London and educated at the Coopers Company School and University College, London, William Atkins trained as draughtsman at E. Graham Wood, a firm of structural engineers.

Atkins worked for various firms, including Dorman Long, in junior roles before being appointed Chief Engineer at Smith Walker in 1928. He then acquired London Ferro-Concrete, a subsidiary of Smith Walker making reinforced concrete, from his employers.

In 1938 he established WS Atkins as an engineering consultancy, severing his connections with London Ferro-concrete in 1950 when it was bought by a new management team. He established his reputation as an engineering consultant by designing a new steelworks at Port Talbot and on the back of this built his firm into a large consultancy.

He was appointed a Commander of the Order of the British Empire (CBE) in the 1966 New Year Honours and was knighted in 1976.

He became an Honorary Freeman of Epsom and Ewell in Surrey.

He died in Woking in 1989.

== Family ==
In 1928 he married Elsie Jessie Barrow and they had two daughters.
