= Absolute Taste =

British catering company

Absolute Taste Limited
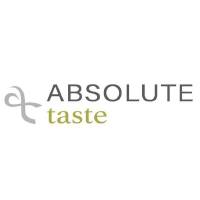
- Trade name: Absolute Taste
- Company type: Private (Ltd)
- Headquarters: The Shed, Unit 2, Charbridge Lane, Bicester, England
- Number of locations: 13 (Absolute Taste restaurants)
- Area served: Global
- Key people: Gary Kennerley (managing director)
- Products: Restaurants; Inflight Catering; Outdoor Catering
- Revenue: £24 million (2011)
- Owner: The Proper Food and Drink Company
- Website: www.absolutetaste.com

Absolute Taste, is a UK-based catering company with Head Quarters in Bicester. Gary Kennerley is its managing director. It had £20 million annual turnover in 2008. It has run projects with Gordon Ramsay Holdings (GRH), McLaren Group, and fleets of private jets. It runs five cafés and restaurants and caters for private parties. Absolute Taste's most notable venue is the McLaren Technology Centre.

== History ==
Absolute Taste was formed in 1997 by Ron Dennis and Lyndy Redding. Dennis owned a 55% interest. Initially centred on providing hospitality for the VIP guests of the McLaren Racing around the world, and for employees at the McLaren headquarters, the company grew and developed a separate identity.

Absolute Taste provided the catering for David Beckham and Victoria Beckham's 2006 FIFA World Cup send-off party, based on Gordon Ramsay's menu.

Absolute Taste catered Nelson Mandela’s 90th Birthday party and Chelsea FC footballer John Terry's wedding.

In 2003, Absolute Taste Inflight was formed. It is a 24-hour, 365-day operation catering for private jets. It began at the suggestion of some McLaren employees and was vetted for a year on a shareholder's own plane. Six vans now deliver pre-prepared gourmet meals to airports all over the South of England.

The company's tenth anniversary happened in 2008, when it announced a partnership with Gordon Ramsay Holdings. "Gordon Ramsay by Absolute Taste" works with Ramsay and his team to produce food from his restaurants for outside events.

Absolute Taste was acquired by One Event Management in December 2016.

== Cafés ==
Absolute Taste operates three cafés. The Design Café and Dome Café are situated in Chelsea Harbour Design Centre. DetoxRetox at Harvey Nichols. There is also the Apron Café at Farnborough Airport. Absolute Taste now operates 13 restaurants, based mainly in the south of England.
