= Dagu Bridge =

Bridge in Tianjin, China

Coordinates: 39.12994°N 117.19648°E

The Dagu Bridge (Chinese 大沽桥) is a bridge between Dagu North Road and Hebei District, Tianjin, China. It was built on July 6, 2003. On July 6, 2006, Otaru Bridge was awarded the Eugene Figo Award at the 2006 International Bridge Conference.

== History ==
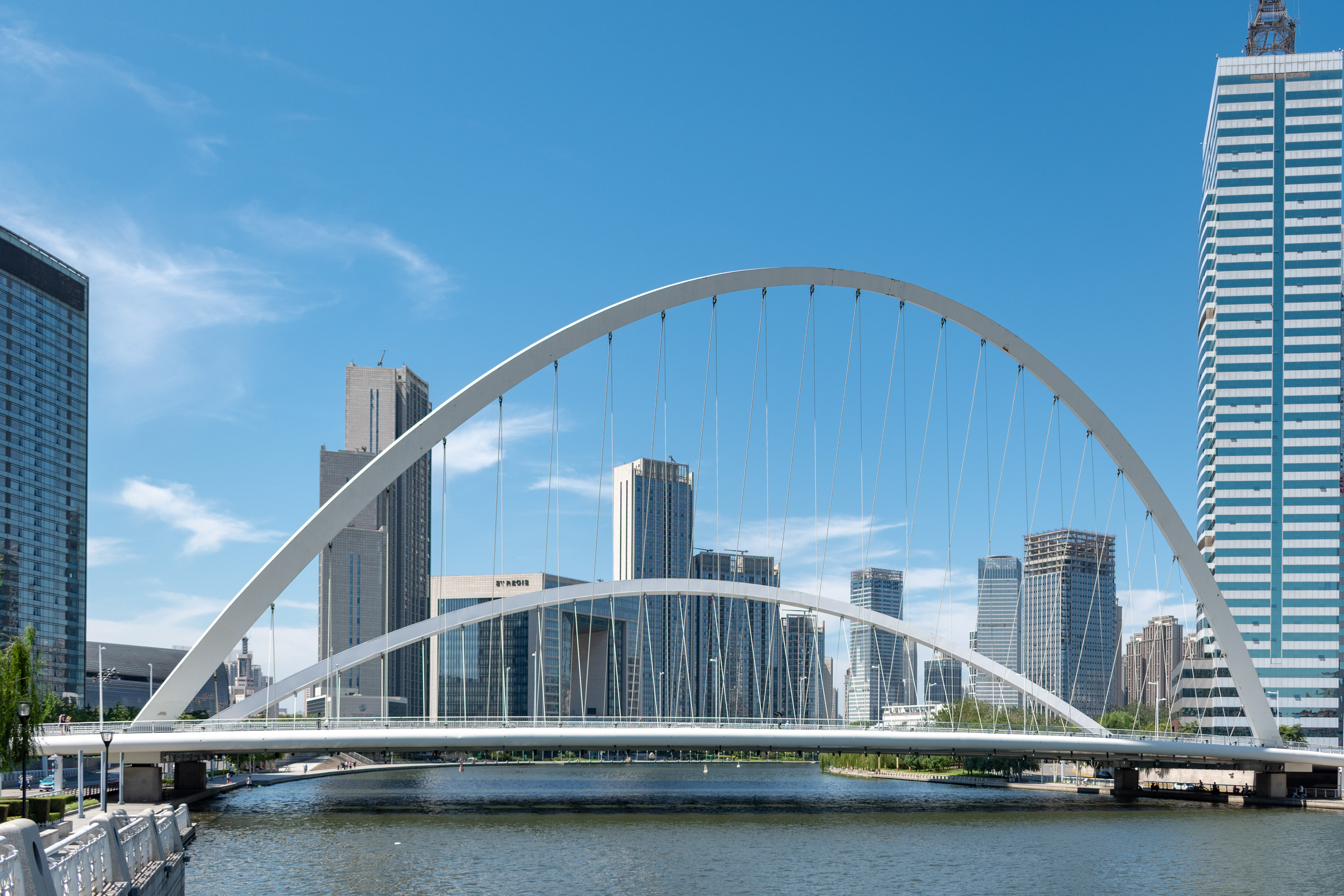

The bridge was completed in 2006.

On the basis of the design proposed by the Tianjin City Construction Group and Lin Tongyan International Company (T.Y.Y.I.), the bridge foreign academician and bridge master Deng Wen proposed the design plan. LIINTERNATIONAL) preliminary design, by the Tianjin City Construction Design Institute for construction drawings, by Tianjin City Construction Group Equipment Co., Ltd., Tianjin City Construction Group Three companies and Tianjin City Construction Group Five companies respectively undertake the construction task, Canada's planning and architectural design company (IDEALS) on the Dagu Bridge and surrounding areas of the conceptual design. The Dagu Bridge started construction on July 6, 2003, and is the first new bridge in the comprehensive development and renovation project of Haihe of the Tianjin Municipal People's Government. On October 6, 2004, the Dagu Bridge ended the epoxy 沥青 concrete bridge deck was laid out and opened on November 27, 2005. On July 6, 2006, at the 2006 International Bridge Conference held in Pittsburgh, Pennsylvania, Dagu Bridge 上海市won the "Eugenie Figo Award" again after the 2002 Jiangyin Yangtze River Bridge in Jiangsu Province and the Shanghai Lupu Bridge in 2004.

== Bridge design ==
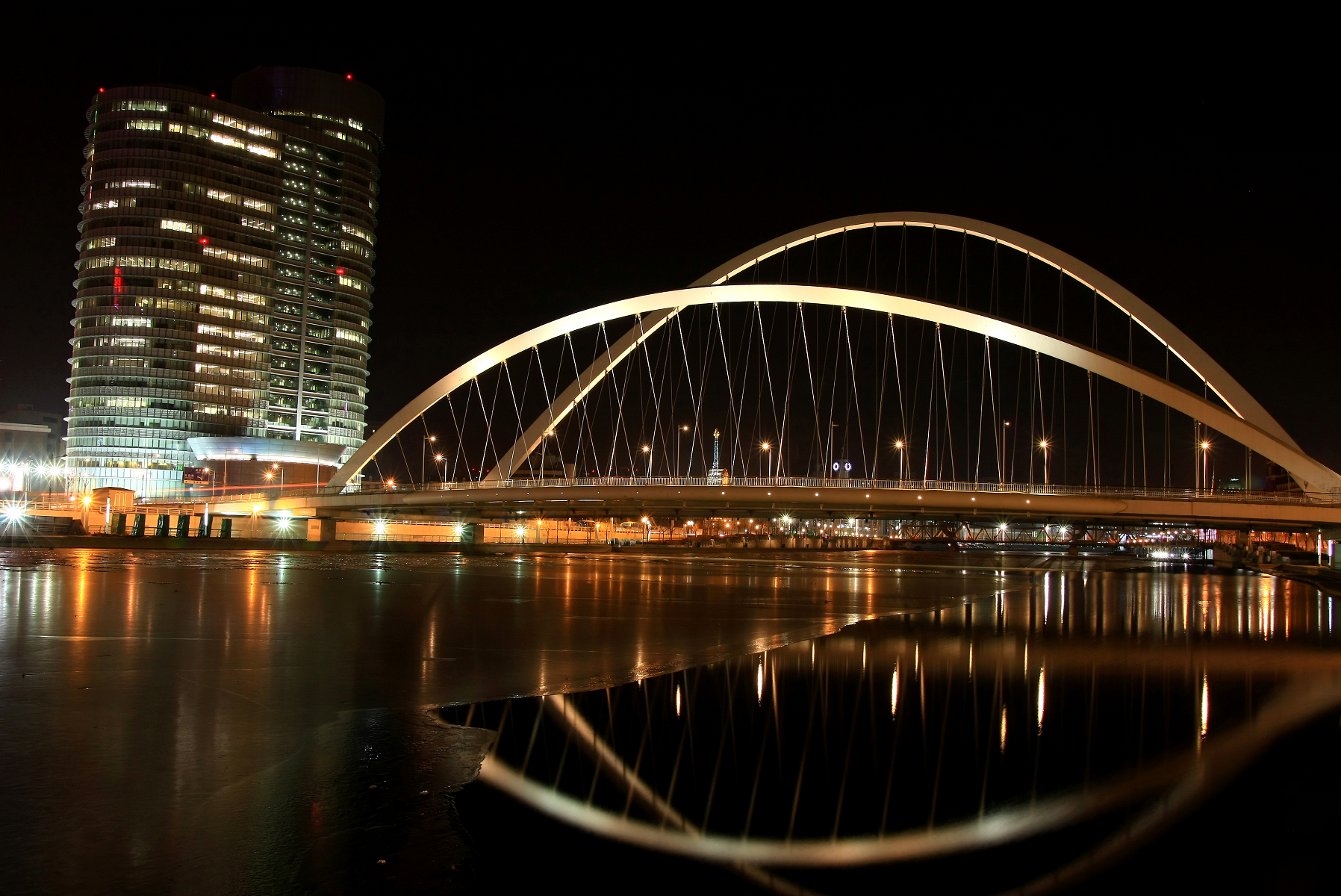

The total length of the Dagu Bridge is 154 meters, the bridge surface is 30 to 59 meters wide, the width of the motor vehicle lane is 24 meters, and the steel of the whole bridge is 4,300 tons. Dagu Bridge and Haihe River River orthogonal, span three spans of continuous beam system, the main span of the bridge beam is 106 meters, the lower bearing type is the pole arch. The bridge area of the Dagu Bridge is 7,000 square meters, and the bridge deck is covered with epoxy asphalt concrete. The basic component materials of Dagu Bridge consist of orthogonal heterosexual steel bridge surface, steel box arches, prestressed steel strands, concrete piers, bearings, bridges, drilling perfusion pile foundations and parallel steel wire harness booms. The design of the bridge is conceived as "Sun Moon Arch" or "Sun Moon Double Whisper Arch", consisting of two asymmetrical arches, the arched ring facing the east, symbolizing the sun, 39 meters high, arc length of 140 meters, tilting outward to 18 degrees, small arch facing west, symbolizing the moon, 19 meters high, arc length of 116 meters, tilting to the outside of 22 degrees. The large arch and small arches are a total of 88 booms on both sides of the Dagu Bridge, carrying all the weights of the 106-meter main span of the bridge, echoing the semi-circular viewing platform stretching out of the bridge, and is a "asymmetrical floating joint beam arch bridge".
