= Faithful+Gould =

Management consultancy

- Company type: Private
- Industry: Project and cost management
- Founded: 1947
- Defunct: October 12, 2023
- Fate: Merged into AtkinsRéalis
- Successor: AtkinsRéalis
- Headquarters: Nova North, London, UK
- Area served: Worldwide
- Website: www.fgould.com

Faithful+Gould (pronounced "Faithful and Gould" or "F and G") was an integrated project and programme management consultancy. It supported clients with the management of their construction projects and programmes.

== History ==
The company was established by Eric Faithful and Leonard Gould in 1947 as they worked together to repair Bristol after it was heavily bombed during the Second World War. Faithful+Gould formed links with various other companies; examples include Imperial Chemical Industries (ICI), where it provided cost valuation and management services across its UK operations, and the National Coal Board, where it aided in the development of Selby Coalfield.

During early 1996, the company was acquired by Atkins via a combined cash and shares deal valued at £21 million; it operated as a subsidiary of the firm thereafter. Following the acquisition, it continued to expand organically as well as through a series of acquisitions; these included Silk & Frazier in 1998, Yeoman & Edwards in 1999 and Hanscomb in 2002.

Faithful+Gould has undertaken numerous projects in the nuclear power sector. In August 2001, it was awarded an advisory role on a £4 billion decommissioning scheme at Dounreay. During 2010, Faithful+Gould and Atkins were awarded a £132 million contract to work on an experimental fusion reactor in southern France.

In 2005, the firm announced plans to double its headcount based in the US within five years. That same year, Faithful & Gould was appointed as the quantity surveyor for a £350 million redevelopment of Birmingham New Street railway station.

During the mid to late 2000s, the firm's UK-based operations underwent considerable change and expansion. In 2007, Faithful+Gould's northern operations were restructured, and a new London-centric property division was created.

In January 2011, Faithful+Gould, together with its parent company Atkins, formed a new consultancy unit aimed at addressing green development and environmental queries.

In October 2012, Simon Burns, the Minister for Transport, stated in Parliament that Faithful+Gould had been responsible for the franchising policy design for the InterCity West Coast franchise competition, which was abandoned and led to reforms. The Laidlaw Inquiry made no criticism of the firm's conduct.

During November 2012, the Bank of Ireland took legal action against Faithful+Gould, seeking £9.9 million over alleged failing related to an abandoned tower project in Manchester. In April 2013, the company purchased the project management business Confluence in exchange for £8.4 million. By the point of this acquisition, Faithful+Gould employed in excess of 2,000 staff at various locations across the world.

In 2016, Faithful+Gould was appointed as programme and project manager of a £1 billion 10-year expansion of the University of Glasgow’s Gilmorehill Campus.

During March 2020, Atkins and Faithful+Gould were awarded a role on the digital signalling upgrade of the East Coast Main Line.

Amid the United Kingdom cladding crisis of the late 2010s and early 2020s, Faithful+Gould was engaged to advise on remediating the unsafe cladding of 187 buildings. During April 2021, the firm was one of three companies selected by the Department for Education to survey 70,000 school buildings throughout Britain. That same year, Faithful+Gould was appointed by the Construction Industry Council to advise businesses on financial best practice while pursuing net zero emissions.

In September 2023, Faithful+Gould rebranded along with SNC Lavalin and Atkins to form AtkinsRéalis - a global design, engineering and project management consultancy.
