= Financial Street Holdings =

Chinese company

Financial Street Holding Company Limited 金融街控股股份有限公司
- Type: State-owned enterprise
- Industry: Real estate
- Founded: 1996
- Headquarters: Beijing, People's Republic of China
- Area served: People's Republic of China
- Key people: Chairman: Mr. Wang Gongwei
- Parent: Beijing Financial Street Construction Group
- Website: www.jrjkg.com

Financial Street Holding Company Limited (SZSE: 000402) is a listed company of the Shenzhen Stock Exchange, which mainly involves in selling and leasing high-end business real estate in Beijing Financial Street area of Beijing, China. Other activities include developing high technology products and the provision of parking services.

It was formerly Chongqing Huaya Modern Paper Work Company Limited which was established in Chongqing in 1996. It changed its name to Financial Street Holding Company Limited in 2000 by backdoor listing from Beijing Financial Street Construction Group. Since 2001, its headquarters has been relocated from Chongqing to Beijing.

== See also ==
- Beijing Financial Street
- Real estate in China
