= Robin Southwell =

British businessman (born 1960)

Robin Southwell OBE
- Born: 10 April 1960 (age 66)
- Education: University of Hull
- Occupation: CEO of EADS UK (now Airbus)
- Spouse: Sally Deakin
- Parents: Peter Southwell (father); Susan Southwell (mother)

Robin Southwell, OBE, is a British businessman. He is the UK head of the aerospace company EADS (now Airbus). He was born on 10 April 1960 (age 66), the son of Peter and Susan Southwell, and lives in Cobham, Surrey. He was educated at Finchley Manor Hill Comprehensive school in Barnet, and went on to read economics and history at the University of Hull.

== Career ==
Southwell worked for British Aerospace (now BAE Systems) from 1981 to 2000. From 2001 to 2002, he was CEO of W S Atkins. He joined EADS in January 2003, initially as CEO of Airtanker Ltd. In July 2005, he was appointed CEO of EADS UK.

== Other appointments ==
Other appointments include:

- Chairman of Quest Aviation Services, Concord Ltd, and Airbase Group Ltd
- President of ADS
- Trustee of the Royal Air Force Museum
- Non-executive director of Farnborough International Ltd
- Governor of Parkside School
- UK Business Ambassador (appointed by Prime Minister David Cameron)
- Chairman of AERALIS Ltd

== Personal life ==
In 1988, he married Sally Deakin and they have one son and one daughter.

== Controversy ==
On 10 May 2014, The Independent newspaper published a report detailing the circumstances surrounding the demise of the company Corporate Jet Services. This company collapsed in 2007, owing its main creditor, HBOS, about £100m. Robin Southwell said via his lawyers that he "was appointed by HBOS to assist a company in difficulty and was only ever a non-executive director that acted on the bank's instructions".
