= Fire extinguisher =

Active fire protection device

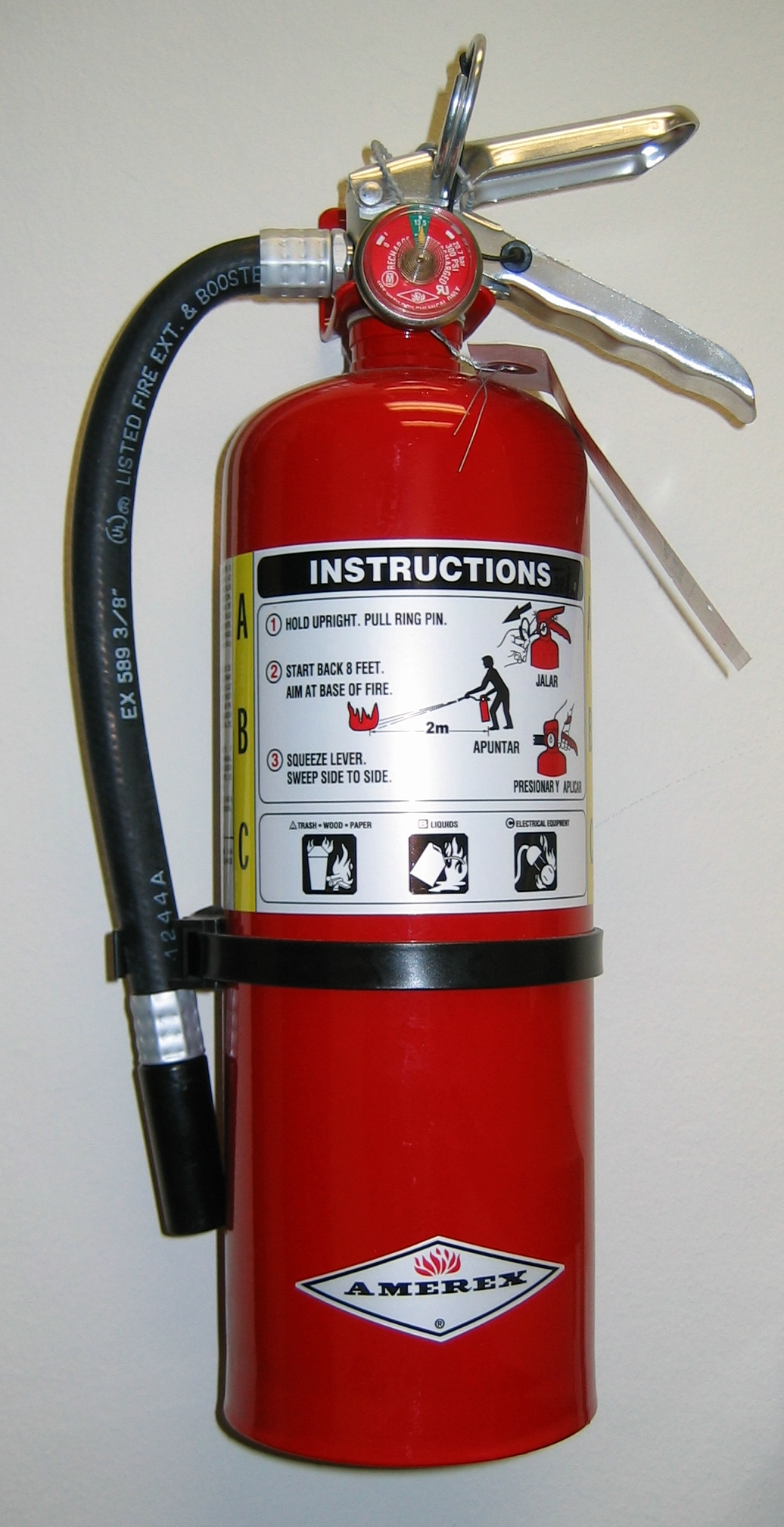
A stored-pressure fire extinguisher

A fire extinguisher is a handheld active fire protection device filled with extinguishing agents such as dry chemical powder, CO_{2}, water, etc. used to extinguish or control small fires, often in emergencies. It is not intended for use on an out-of-control fire, such as one which has reached the ceiling, endangers the user (i.e., no escape route, smoke, explosion hazard, etc.), or otherwise requires the equipment, personnel, resources or expertise of a fire brigade. Typically, a fire extinguisher consists of a hand-held cylindrical pressure vessel containing an agent that can be discharged to extinguish a fire. Fire extinguishers manufactured with non-cylindrical pressure vessels also exist, but are less common.

There are two main types of fire extinguishers: stored-pressure and cartridge-operated. In stored-pressure units, the expellant is stored in the same chamber as the firefighting agent itself. Depending on the agent used, different propellants are used. With dry chemical extinguishers, nitrogen is typically used; water and foam extinguishers typically use air. Stored pressure fire extinguishers are the most common type. Cartridge-operated extinguishers contain the expellant gas in a separate cartridge that is punctured before discharge, exposing the propellant to the extinguishing agent. This type is not as common, used primarily in areas such as industrial facilities, where they receive higher-than-average use. They have the advantage of simple and prompt recharge, allowing an operator to discharge the extinguisher, recharge it, and return to the fire in a reasonable amount of time. Unlike stored pressure types, these extinguishers use compressed carbon dioxide instead of nitrogen, although nitrogen cartridges are used on low-temperature (–60 rated) models. Cartridge-operated extinguishers are available in dry chemical and dry powder types in the U.S. and water, wetting agent, foam, dry chemical (classes ABC and B.C.), and dry powder (class D) types in the rest of the world.

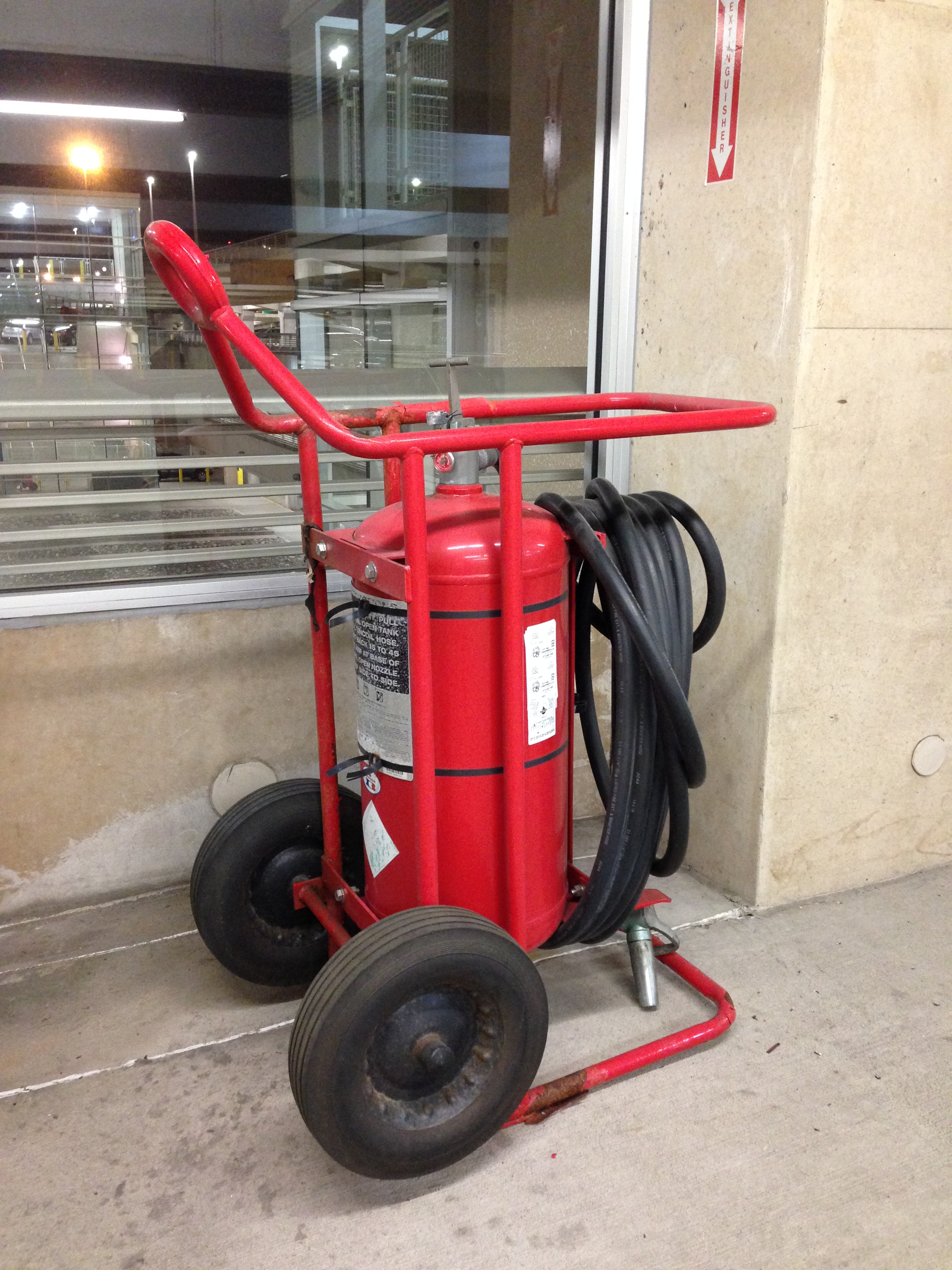
Wheeled fire extinguisher and a sign inside a parking lot

Fire extinguishers are further divided into handheld and cart-mounted (also called wheeled extinguishers). Handheld extinguishers weigh from 0.5 to 26.76 kilograms (1.1 to 59.0 lb), and are hence easily portable by hand. Cart-mounted units typically weigh more than 106.6 kilograms (235 lb). These wheeled models are most commonly found at construction sites, airport runways, heliports, as well as docks and marinas.

== History ==
The first fire extinguisher of which there is any record was patented in England in 1723 by Ambrose Godfrey, a celebrated chemist at that time. It consisted of a cask of fire-extinguishing liquid containing a pewter chamber of gunpowder. This was connected with a system of fuses which were ignited, exploding the gunpowder and scattering the solution. This device was probably used to a limited extent, as Bradley's Weekly Messenger for November 7, 1729, refers to its efficiency in stopping a fire in London.

A portable pressurised fire extinguisher, the 'Extincteur', was invented by British Captain George William Manby and demonstrated in 1816 to the 'Commissioners for the affairs of Barracks'; it consisted of a copper vessel of 3 gallons (13.6 liters) of pearl ash (potassium carbonate) solution contained within compressed air. When operated it expelled liquid onto the fire.

One of the first fire extinguisher patents was issued to Alanson Crane of Virginia on Feb. 10, 1863.

Thomas J. Martin, an American inventor, was awarded a patent for an improvement in the Fire Extinguishers on March 26, 1872. His invention is listed in the U. S. Patent Office in Washington, DC under patent number 125,603.

The soda-acid extinguisher was first patented in 1866 by Francois Carlier of France, which mixed a solution of water and sodium bicarbonate with tartaric acid, producing the propellant carbon dioxide (CO_{2}) gas. A soda-acid extinguisher was patented in the U.S. in 1880 by Almon M. Granger. His extinguisher used the reaction between sodium bicarbonate solution and sulfuric acid to expel pressurized water onto a fire. A vial of concentrated sulfuric acid was suspended in the cylinder. Depending on the type of extinguisher, the vial of acid could be broken in one of two ways. One used a plunger to break the acid vial, while the second released a lead stopple that held the vial closed. Once the acid was mixed with the bicarbonate solution, carbon dioxide gas was expelled and thereby pressurized the water. The pressurized water was forced from the canister through a nozzle or short length of hose.

The cartridge-operated extinguisher was invented by Read & Campbell of England in 1881, which used water or water-based solutions. They later invented a carbon tetrachloride model called the "Petrolex" which was marketed toward automotive use.

The chemical foam extinguisher was invented in 1904 by Aleksandr Loran in Russia, based on his previous invention of fire fighting foam. Loran first used it to extinguish a pan of burning naphtha. It worked and looked similar to the soda-acid type, but the inner parts were slightly different. The main tank contained a solution of sodium bicarbonate in water, whilst the inner container (somewhat larger than the equivalent in a soda-acid unit) contained a solution of aluminium sulphate. When the solutions were mixed, usually by inverting the unit, the two liquids reacted to create a frothy foam, and carbon dioxide gas. The gas expelled the foam in the form of a jet. Although liquorice-root extracts and similar compounds were used as additives (stabilizing the foam by reinforcing the bubble-walls), there was no "foam compound" in these units. The foam was a combination of the products of the chemical reactions: sodium and aluminium salt-gels inflated by the carbon dioxide. Because of this, the foam was discharged directly from the unit, with no need for an aspirating branchpipe (as in newer mechanical foam types). Special versions were made for rough service, and vehicle mounting, known as apparatus of fire department types. Key features were a screw-down stopper that kept the liquids from mixing until it was manually opened, carrying straps, a longer hose, and a shut-off nozzle. Fire department types were often private label versions of major brands, sold by apparatus manufacturers to match their vehicles. Examples are Pirsch, Ward LaFrance, Mack, Seagrave, etc. These types are some of the most collectable extinguishers as they cross into both the apparatus restoration and fire extinguisher areas of interest.

In 1910, the Pyrene Manufacturing Company of Delaware filed a patent for using carbon tetrachloride (CTC, or CCl_{4}) to extinguish fires. The liquid vaporized and extinguished the flames by inhibiting the chemical chain reaction of the combustion process (it was an early 20th-century presupposition that the fire suppression ability of carbon tetrachloride relied on oxygen removal). In 1911, they patented a small, portable extinguisher that used the chemical. This consisted of a brass or chrome container with an integrated handpump, which was used to expel a jet of liquid towards the fire. It was usually of 1 imperial quart (1.1 L) or 1 imperial pint (0.57 L) capacity but was also available in up to 2 imperial gallons (9.1 L) size. As the container was unpressurized, it could be refilled after use through a filling plug with a fresh supply of CTC.

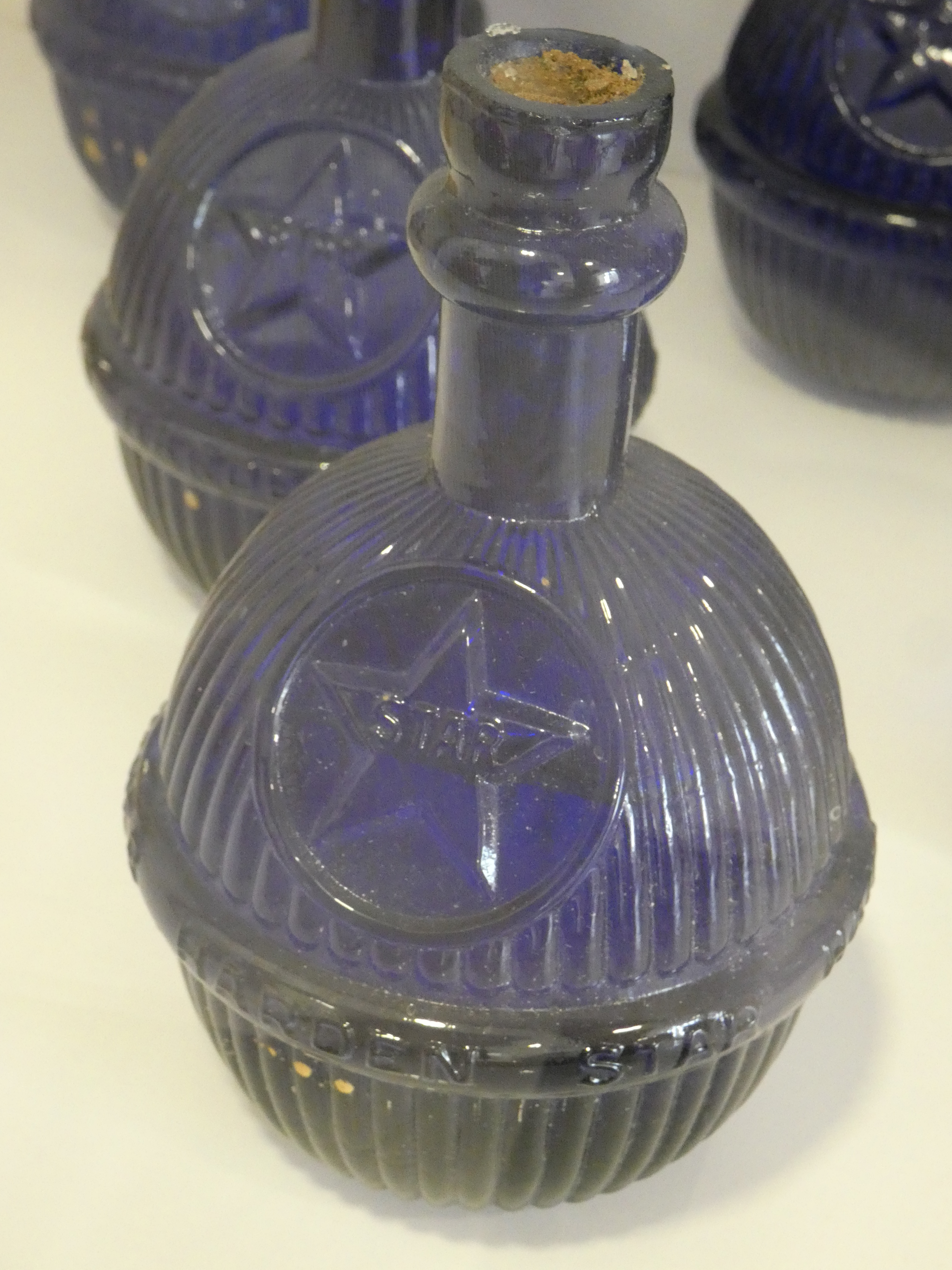
A fire grenade

Another type of carbon tetrachloride extinguisher was the fire grenade. This consisted of a glass sphere filled with CTC, that was intended to be hurled at the base of a fire (early ones used salt-water, but CTC was more effective). Carbon tetrachloride was suitable for liquid and electrical fires and the extinguishers were fitted to motor vehicles. Carbon tetrachloride extinguishers were withdrawn in the 1950s because of the chemical's toxicity – exposure to high concentrations damages the nervous system and internal organs. Additionally, when used on a fire, the heat can convert CTC to phosgene gas, formerly used as a chemical weapon.

The carbon dioxide extinguisher was invented (at least in the US) by the Walter Kidde Company in 1924 in response to Bell Telephone's request for an electrically non-conductive chemical for extinguishing the previously difficult-to-extinguish fires in telephone switchboards. It consisted of a tall metal cylinder containing 7.5 pounds (3.4 kg) of CO_{2} with a wheel valve and a woven brass, cotton-covered hose, with a composite funnel-like horn as a nozzle. CO_{2} is still popular today as it is an ozone-friendly clean agent and is used heavily in film and television production to extinguish burning stuntmen. Carbon dioxide extinguishes fire mainly by displacing oxygen. It was once thought that it worked by cooling, although this effect on most fires is negligible. An anecdotal report of a carbon dioxide fire extinguisher was published in Scientific American in 1887 which describes the case of a basement fire at a Louisville, Kentucky pharmacy which melted a lead pipe charge with CO_{2} (called carbonic acid gas at the time) intended for a soda fountain which immediately extinguished the flames thus saving the building. Also in 1887, carbonic acid gas was described as a fire extinguisher for engine chemical fires at sea and ashore.

In 1928, DuGas (later bought by ANSUL) came out with a cartridge-operated dry chemical extinguisher, which used sodium bicarbonate specially treated with chemicals to render it free-flowing and moisture-resistant. It consisted of a copper cylinder with an internal CO_{2} cartridge. The operator turned a wheel valve on top to puncture the cartridge and squeezed a lever on the valve at the end of the hose to discharge the chemical. This was the first agent available for large-scale three-dimensional liquid and pressurized gas fires, but remained largely a specialty type until the 1950s, when small dry chemical units were marketed for home use. ABC dry chemical came over from Europe in the 1950s, with Super-K being invented in the early 1960s and Purple-K being developed by the United States Navy in the late 1960s. Manually applied dry agents such as graphite for class D (metal) fires had existed since World War II, but it was not until 1949 that Ansul introduced a pressurized extinguisher using an external CO_{2} cartridge to discharge the agent. Met-L-X (sodium chloride) was the first extinguisher developed in the US, with graphite, copper, and several other types being developed later.

In the 1940s, Germany invented the liquid chlorobromomethane (CBM) for use in aircraft. It was more effective and slightly less toxic than carbon tetrachloride and was used until 1969. Methyl bromide was discovered as an extinguishing agent in the 1920s and was used extensively in Europe. It is a low-pressure gas that works by inhibiting the chain reaction of the fire and is the most toxic of the vaporizing liquids, used until the 1960s. The vapor and combustion by-products of all vaporizing liquids were highly toxic and could cause death in confined spaces.

In the 1970s, Halon 1211 came over to the United States from Europe where it had been used since the late 1940s or early 1950s. Halon 1301 had been developed by DuPont and the United States Army in 1954. Both 1211 and 1301 work by inhibiting the chain reaction of the fire, and in the case of Halon 1211, cooling class A fuels as well. Halon is still in use today but is falling out of favor for many uses due to its environmental impact. Europe and Australia have severely restricted its use, since the Montreal Protocol of 1987. Less severe restrictions have been implemented in the United States, the Middle East, and Asia.

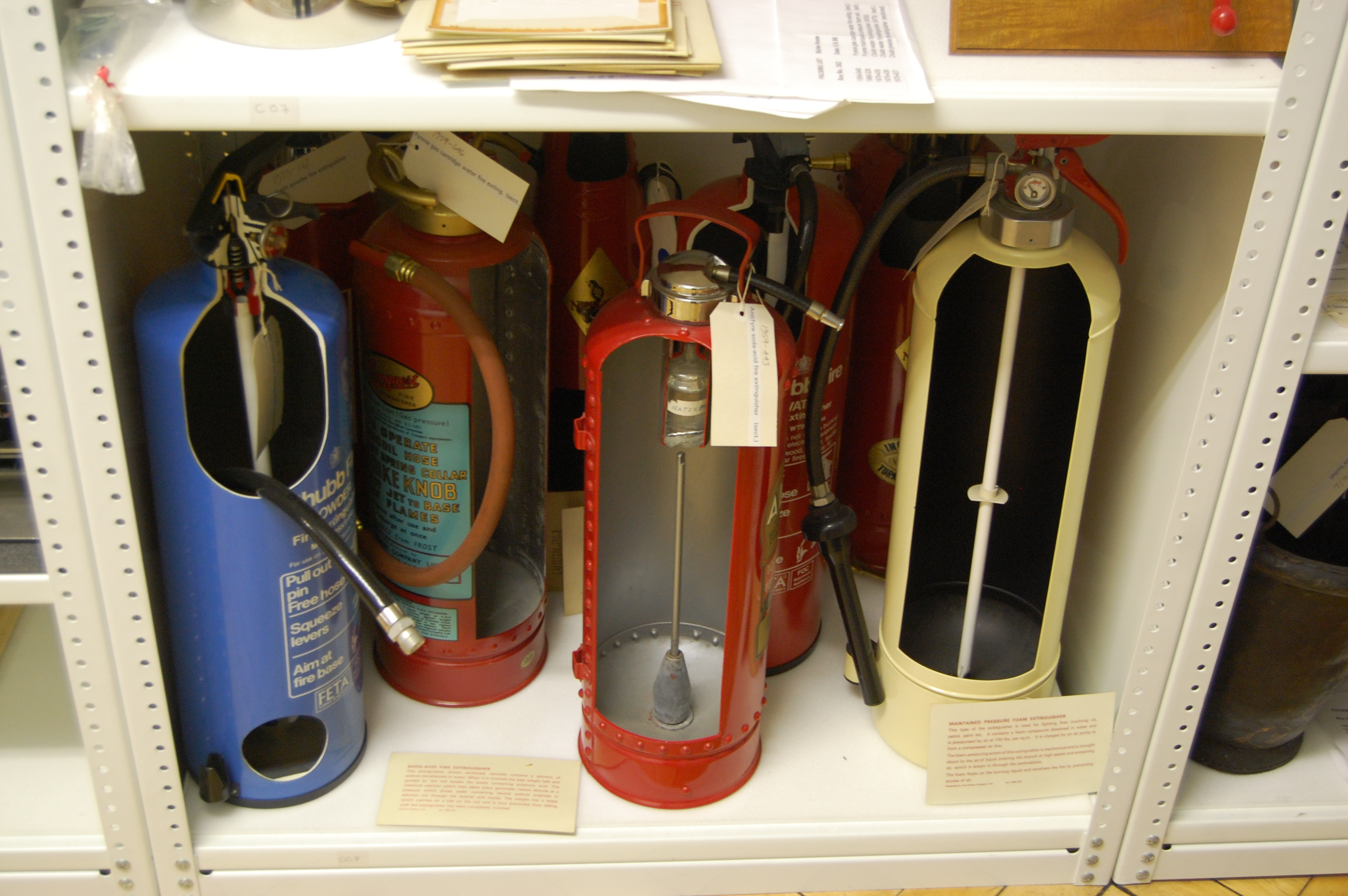
Fire extinguishers in a museum storeroom, cut to display their inner workings

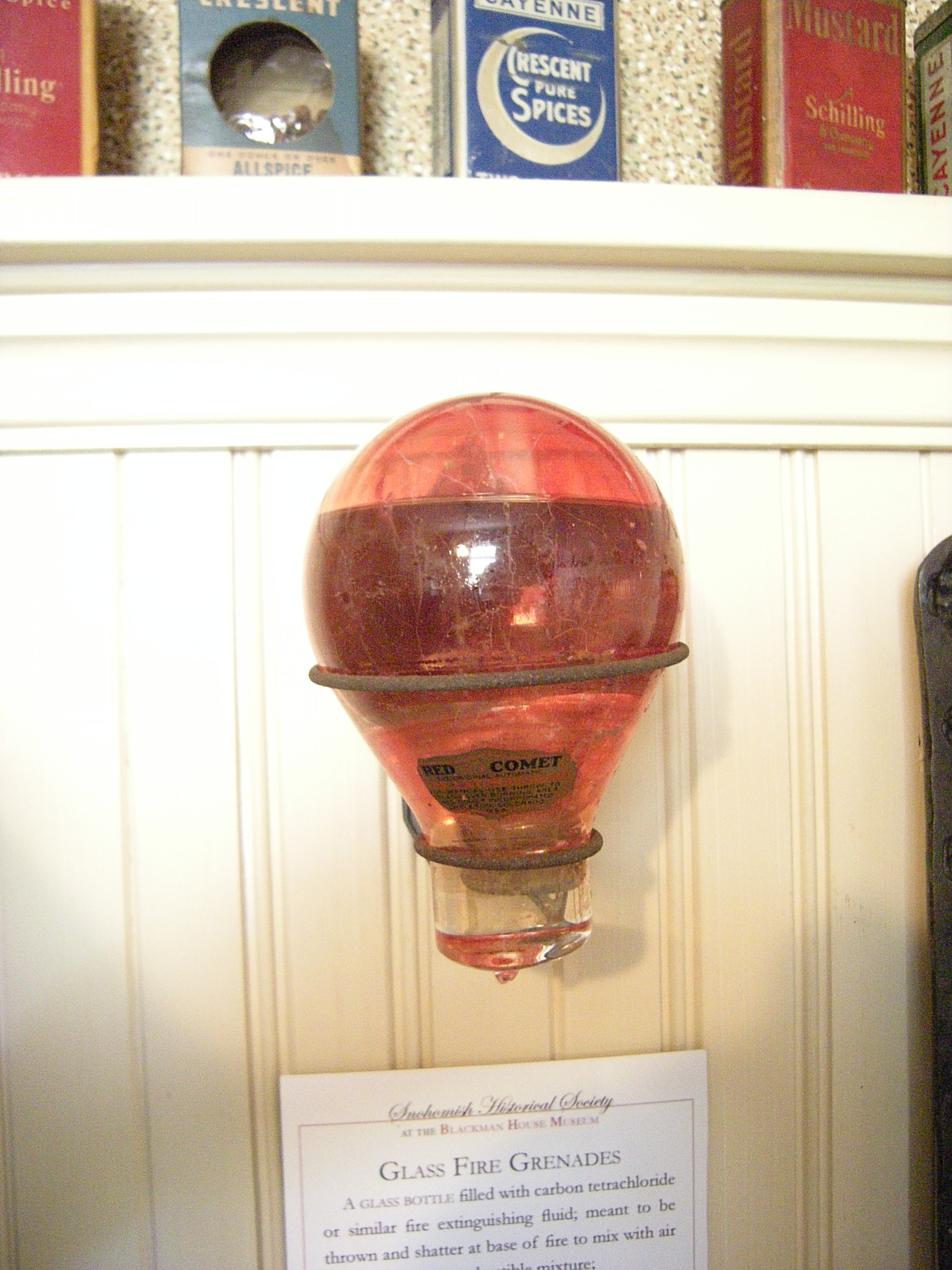
A glass grenade-style extinguisher, to be thrown into a fire

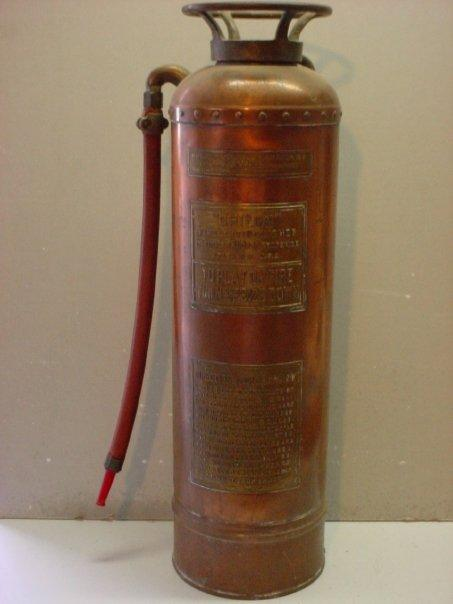
A US copper building type soda-acid extinguisher

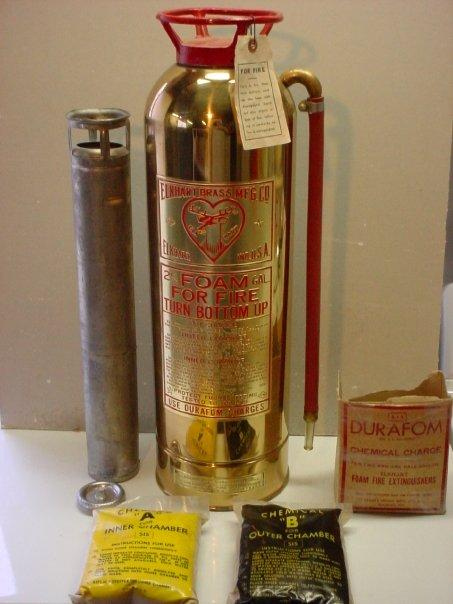
A US building-type chemical foam extinguisher with contents

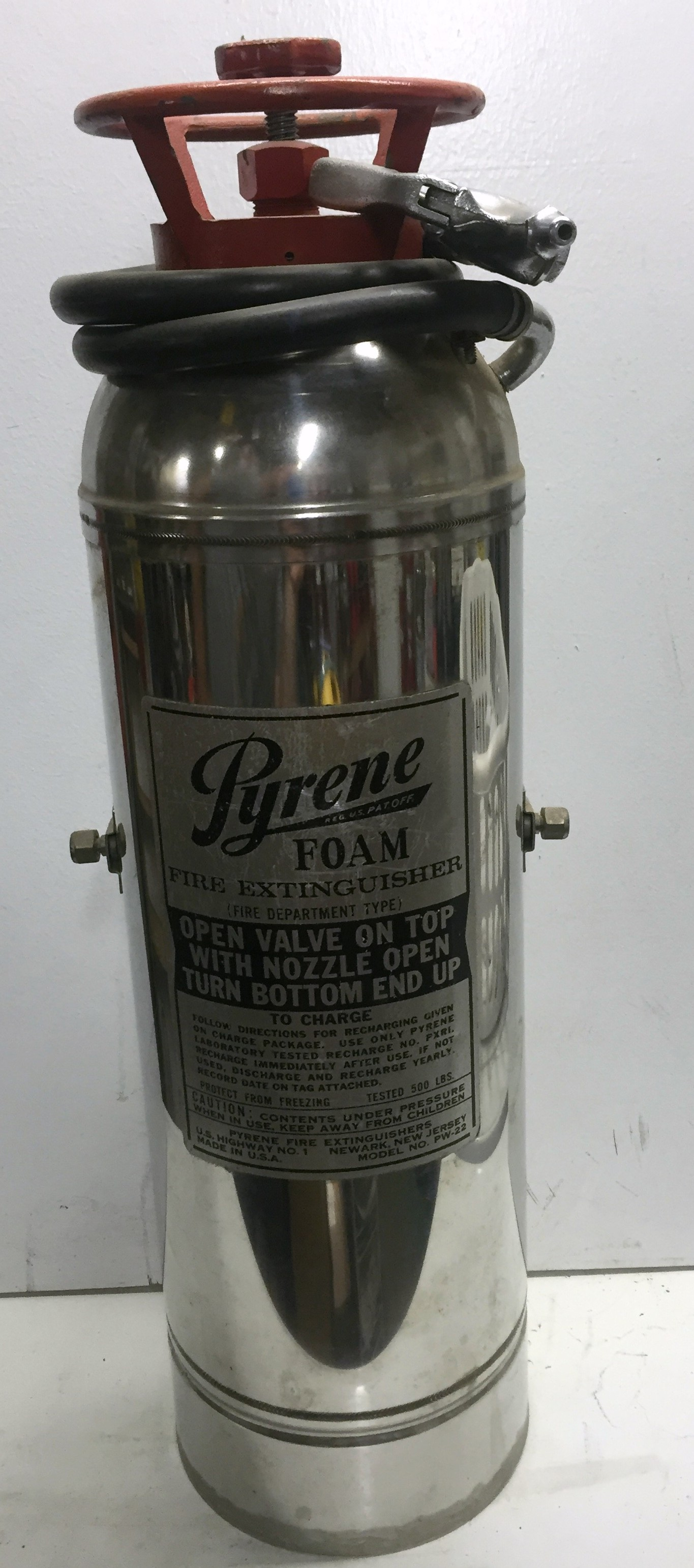
Pyrene apparatus type chemical foam, 1960s

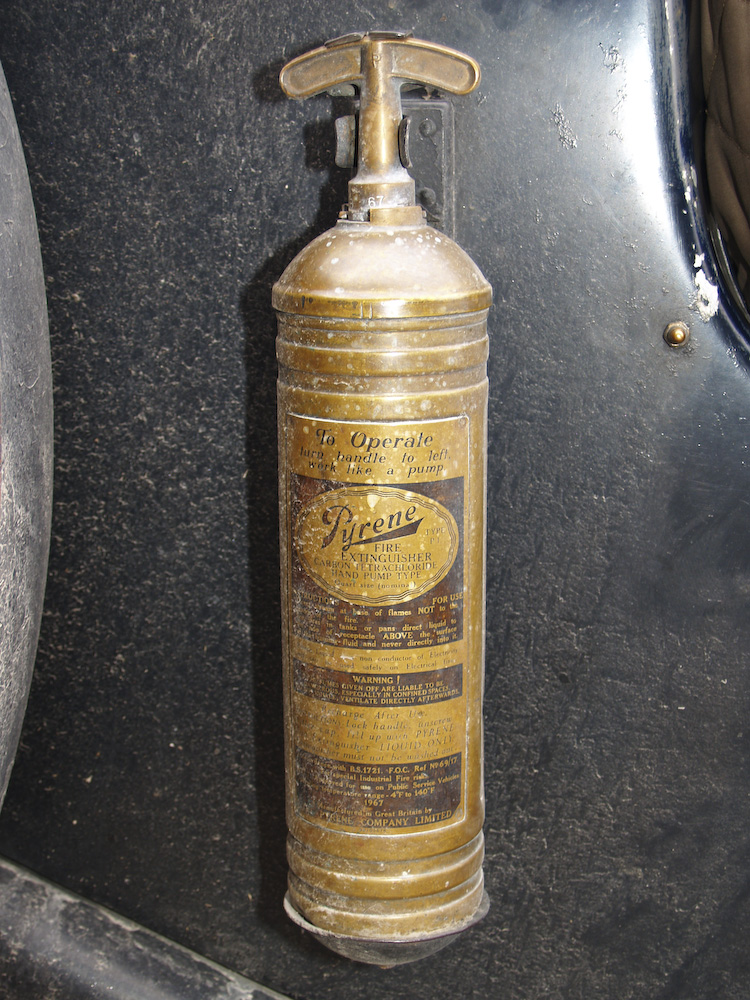
A Pyrene, brass, carbon tetrachloride extinguisher

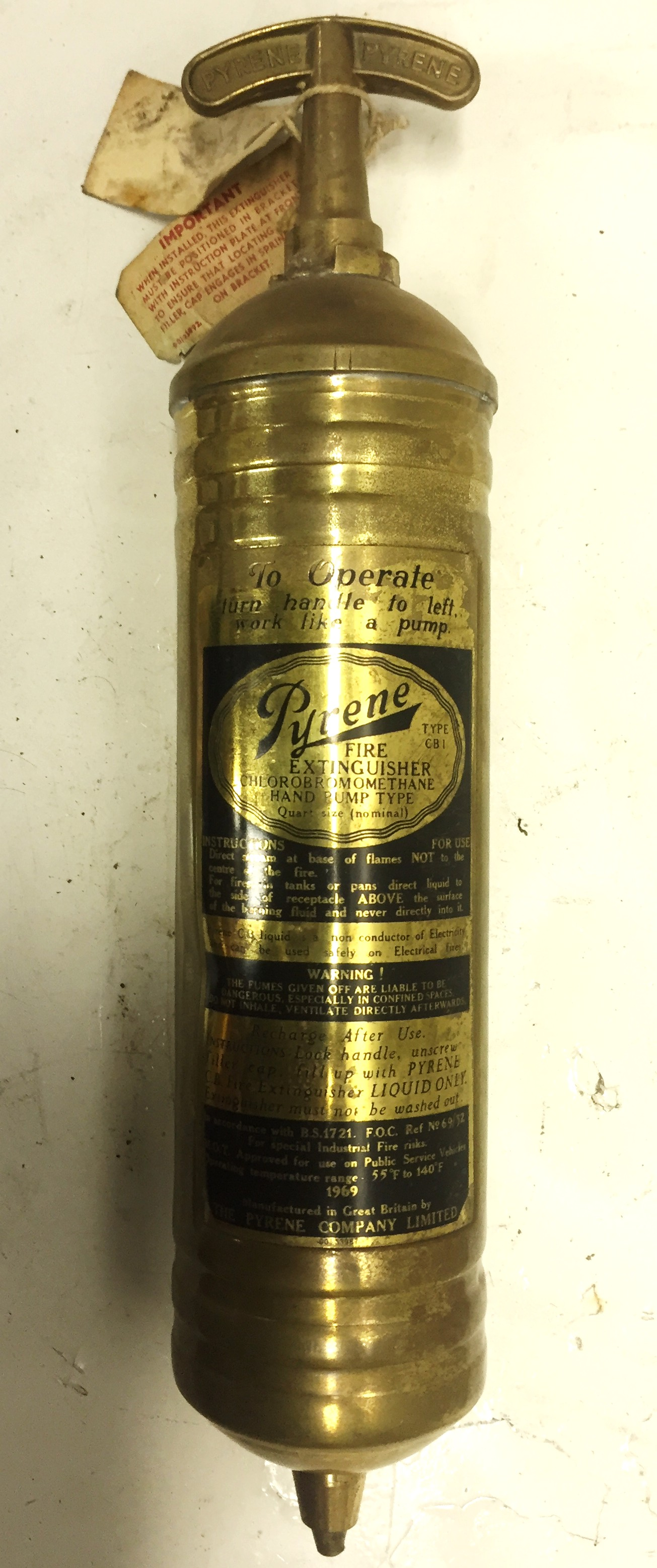
Pyrene 1 qt. pump-type chlorobromomethane (CB or CBM), 1960s, UK

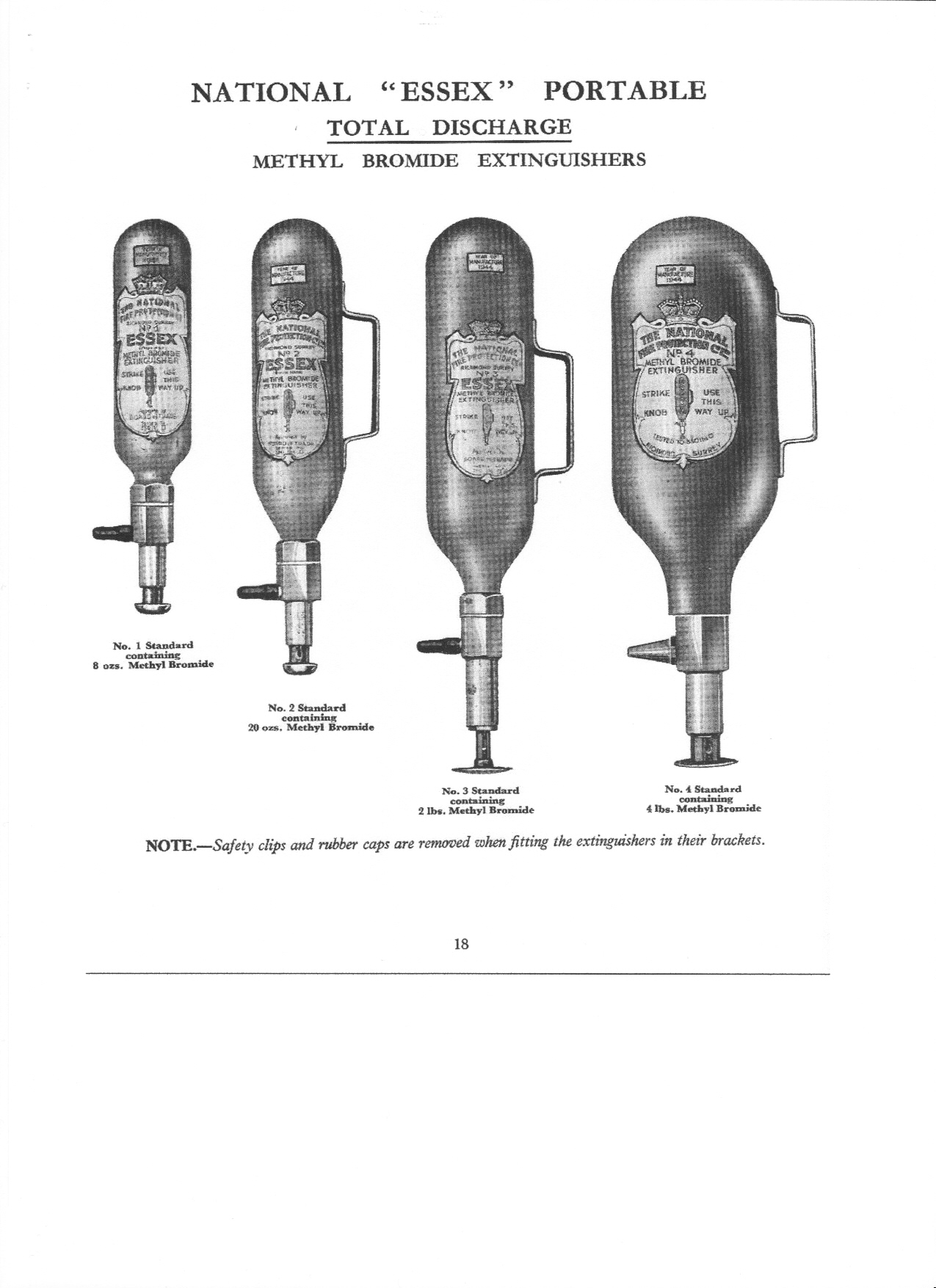
National Methyl Bromide extinguishers, UK, 1930s–1940s

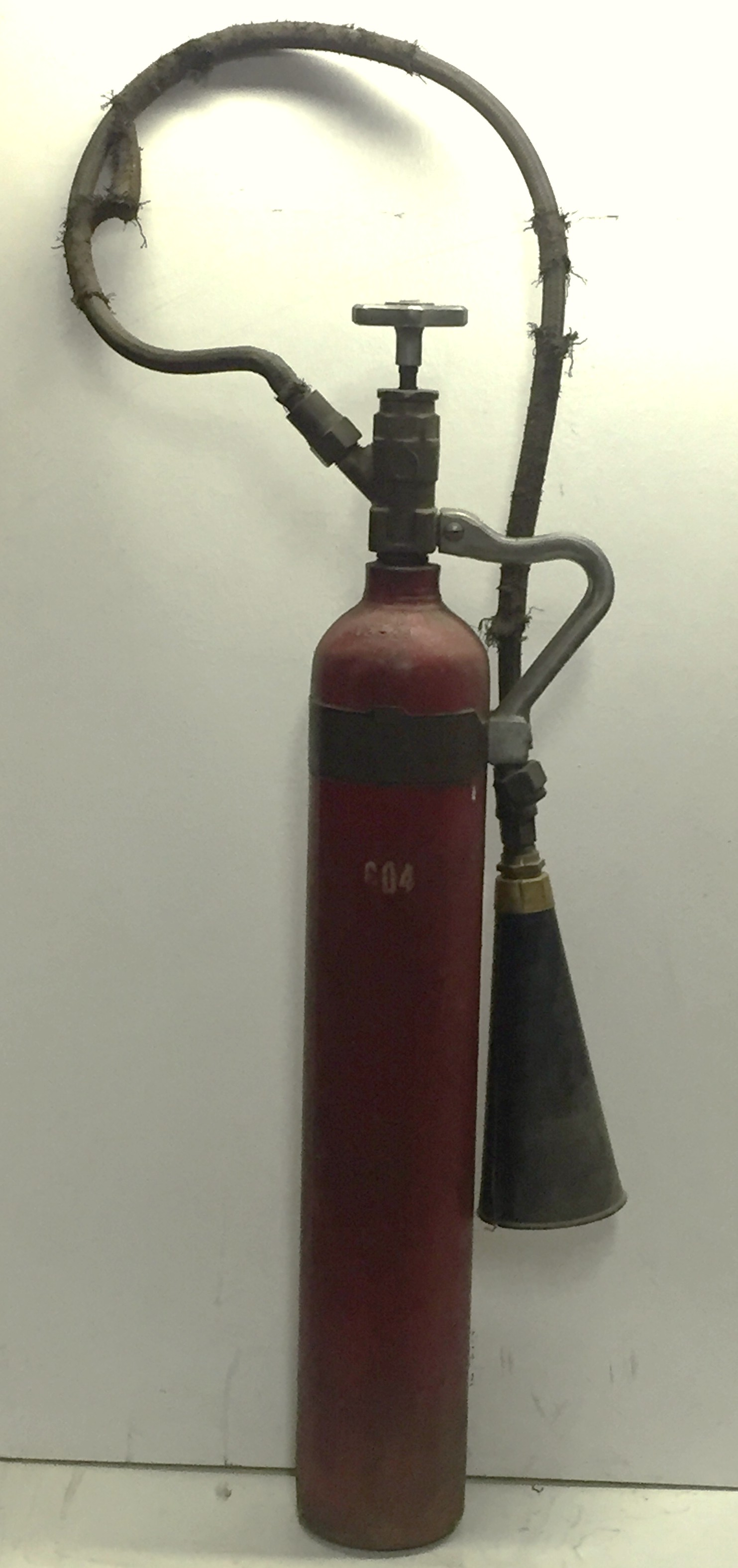
Bell Telephone CO_{2} extinguisher made by Walter Kidde, 1928

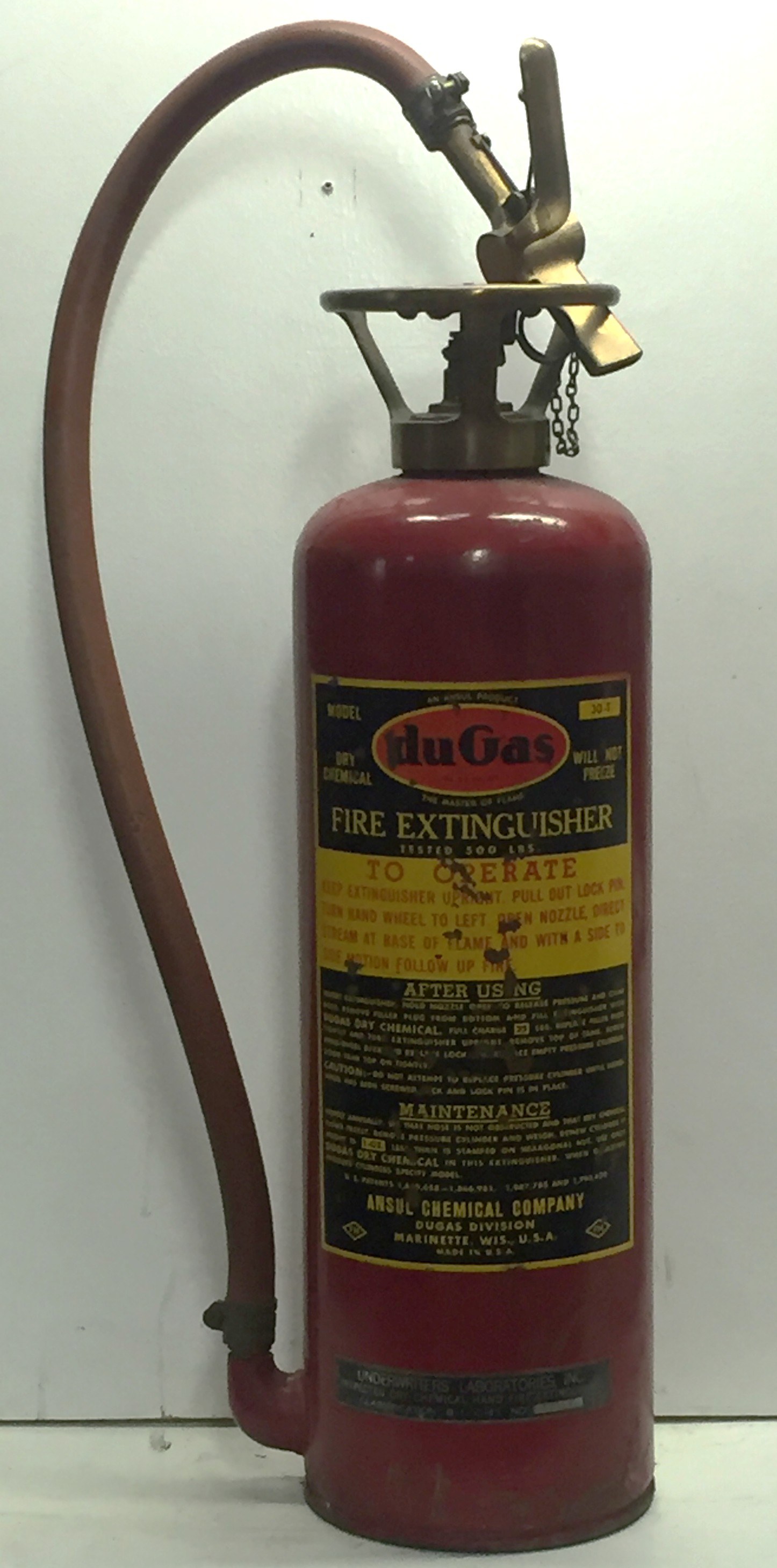
Du Gas cartridge-operated dry chemical extinguisher, 1945

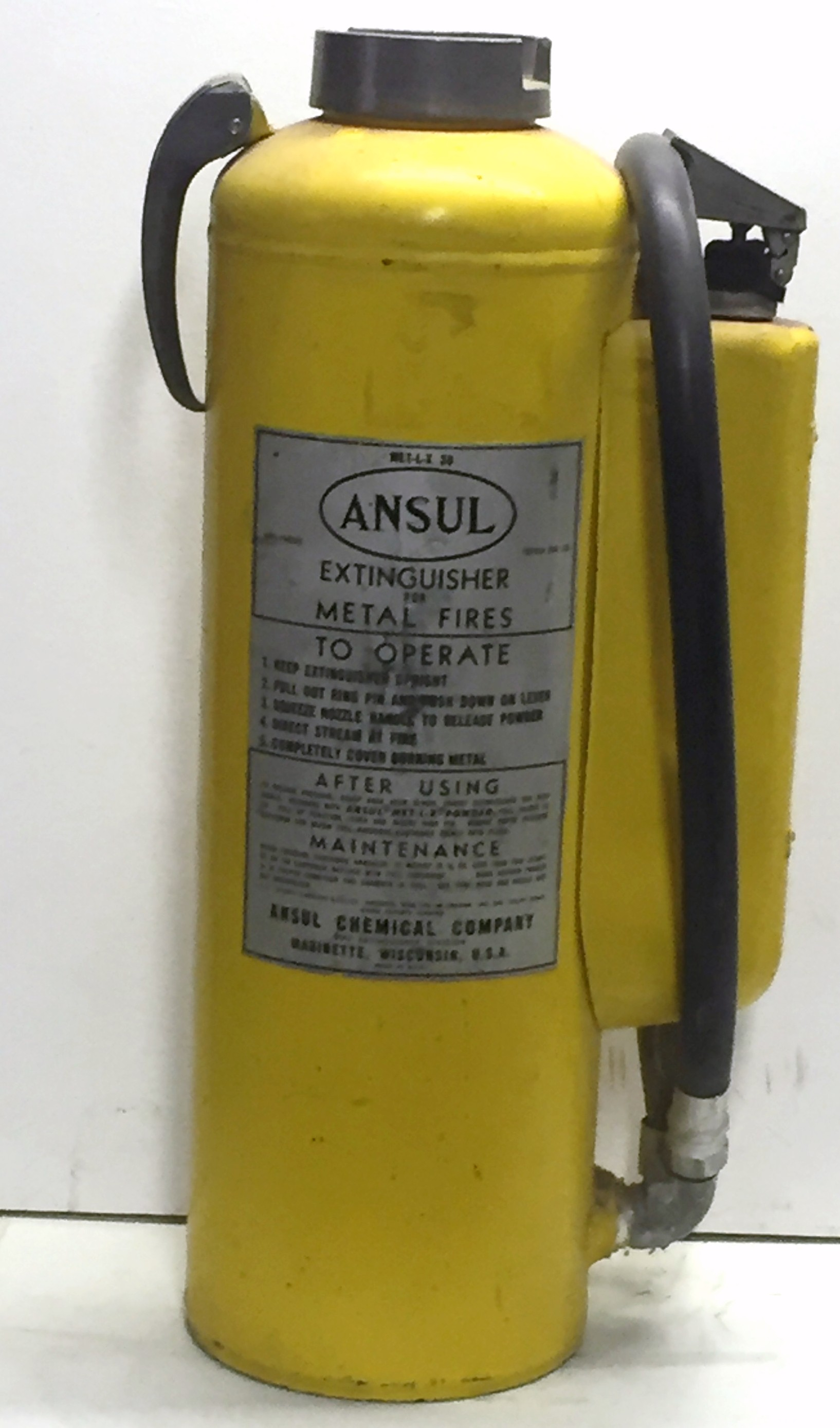
Ansul Met-L-X cartridge-operated dry powder fire extinguisher for class D fires, 1950s

== Classification ==
Internationally there are several accepted classification methods for hand-held fire extinguishers. Each classification is useful in fighting fires with a particular group of fuel.

Comparison of fire classes
Europe/UK	Australia/Asia	United States	Fuel/heat source
Class A	Class A	Class A	Ordinary combustibles
Class B	Class B	Class B	Flammable liquids
Class C	Class C	Class B	Flammable gases
Class D	Class D	Class D	Combustible metals
Unclassified	Class E	Class C	Electrical equipment (hazard)
Class F	Class F	Class K	Cooking oil or fat

=== Australia and New Zealand ===
Specifications of fire extinguishers are set out in the standard AS/NZS 1841, the most recent version having been released in 2007. All fire extinguishers must be painted signal red. Except for water based extinguishers, each extinguisher has a coloured band near the top, covering at least 10% of the extinguisher's body length, specifying its contents.

Type	Band colour	Fire classes (brackets denote sometimes applicable)					
Type	Band colour	A	B	C	D	E	F
Water	Signal red	A					
Wet chemical	Oatmeal	A					F
Foam	Ultramarine blue	A	B				
Dry chemical	White	A	B	C		E	
Dry powder (metal fires)	Lime green				D		
Carbon dioxide	Black	(A)	B			E	
Vaporizing liquid (non-halon clean agents)	Golden yellow	A	B	C		E	
Halon	No longer produced	A	B			E	

Due to the ozone-depleting nature of halon, in Australia yellow (Halon) fire extinguishers are illegal to own or use on a fire, unless an essential use exemption has been granted.

=== United Kingdom ===
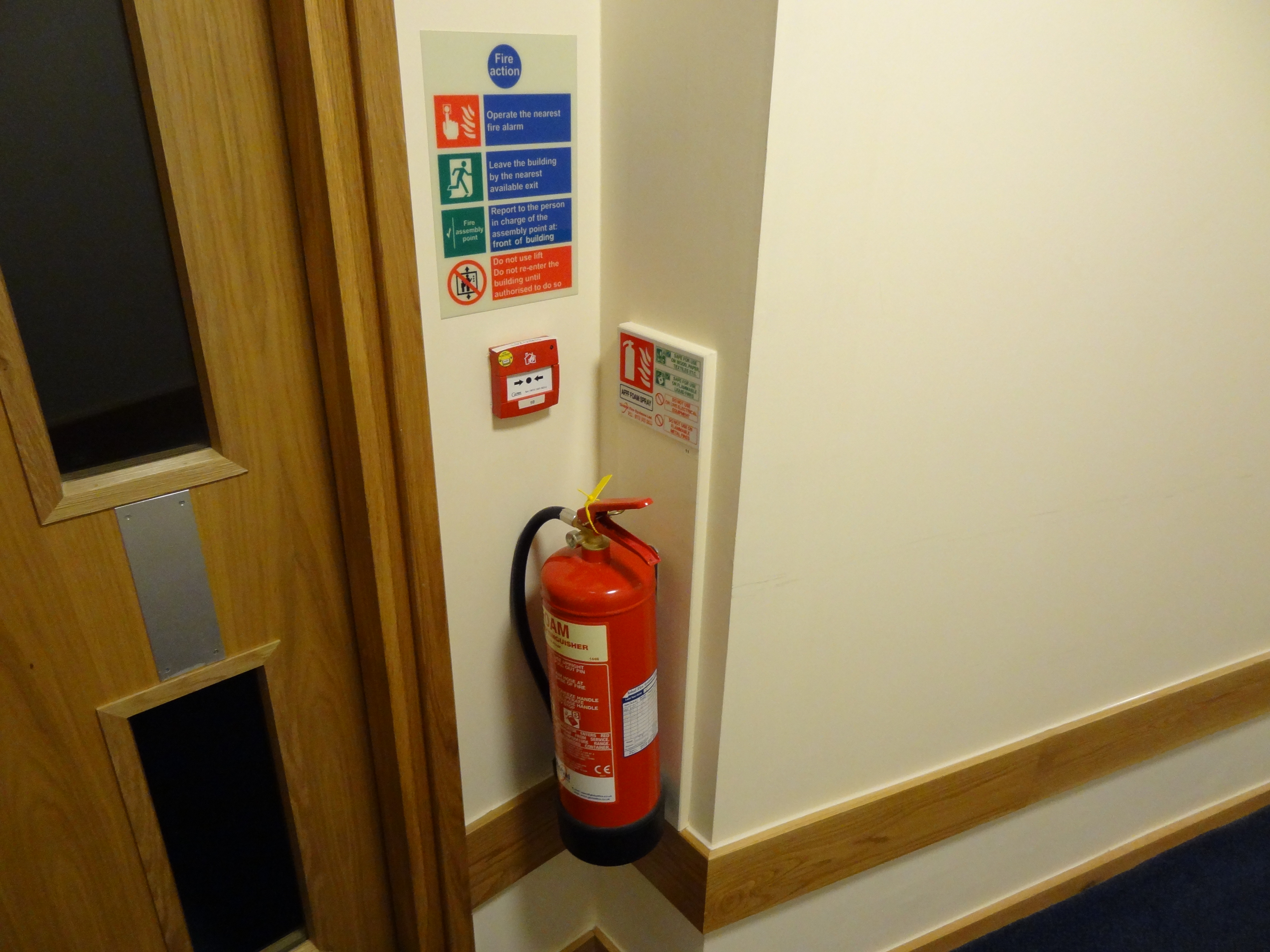
A British fire extinguisher with ID sign, call point and fire action sign

According to British standard BS EN 3, fire extinguishers in the United Kingdom, same as throughout Europe, are red RAL 3000, with a band or circle of a second color covering between 5–10% of the surface area of the extinguisher, above the operating instructions, indicating its contents. Before 1997, the entire body of the fire extinguisher was color coded according to the type of extinguishing agent.

The UK recognises five fire classes:

- Class A fires involve organic solids such as paper and wood.
- Class B fires involve flammable or combustible liquids, excluding cooking fats and oils.
- Class C fires involve flammable gases.
- Class D fires involve combustible metals.
- Class K fires involve cooking fats and oils.

Class E has been discontinued, previously covering fires involving electrical hazards. This is no longer used on the basis that, when the power supply is turned off, an electrical fire can fall into any of the remaining five categories. EN3 does however allow extinguishers to bear a special electrical pictogram signifying that it can be used on live electrical fires (given the symbol E in the table), if it passes special testing (a 35 kV dielectric test per EN 3-7:2004). A powder or CO_{2} extinguisher will feature this as standard. A water-based extinguisher may feature it if it passes the 35 kV test, however all water-based extinguishers are only recommended for inadvertent use on electrical fires.

Type	Old code	BS EN 3 colour code	Fire classes (brackets denote sometimes applicable)					
Type	Old code	BS EN 3 colour code	A	B	C	D	E	F
Water	Signal red	Signal red	A					
Water Mist	Signal red (not in use)	Signal red	A	(B)	(C)		E	F
Foam	Cream	Red with a cream panel	A	B				
Dry powder	French blue	Red with a blue panel	A	B	C		E	
Monex dry powder	French blue	Red with a blue panel		B	C			
Carbon dioxide, CO_{2}	Black	Red with a black panel		B			E	
Wet chemical	Yellow (not in use) / Silver	Red with a canary yellow panel	A	(B)				F
Class D powder (L2 / M28)	French blue	Originally red with a blue, now purple, panel				D		
Lithium-ion	Medium Sea Green (not in use)	red with a green panel (some also have a green base)	A				E	
Firexo ©	Red Ribbon & Vivid blue (not in use)	red with a red & blue logo with white text and operating instructions	A				E	
Halon 1211/BCF	Emerald green	No longer in general use	A	B			E	

In the UK, the use of Halon gas is now prohibited except under certain situations such as on aircraft and in the military and police.

Fire extinguishing performance per fire class is displayed using numbers and letters such as 13A, 55B.

=== United States ===
There is no official standard in the United States for the color of fire extinguishers, though they are usually red, except for class D extinguishers which are usually yellow, water and Class K wet chemical extinguishers which are usually silver, and water mist extinguishers which are usually white. Extinguishers are marked with pictograms depicting the types of fires that the extinguisher is approved to fight. In the past extinguishers were marked with colored geometric symbols, and some extinguishers still use both symbols. The types of fires and additional standards are described in NFPA 10: Standard for Portable Fire Extinguishers, 2013 edition.

Fire class	Geometric symbol	Pictogram	Intended use	Mnemonic
A	Green triangle, with letter A		Ordinary solid combustibles	A for "Ash"
B	Red square with letter B		Flammable liquids and gases	B for "Barrel"
C	Blue circle with letter C		Energized electrical equipment	C for "Current"
D	Yellow 5-pointed star with letter D		Combustible metals	D for "Dynamite"
K	Black hexagon with letter K		Oils and fats	K for "Kitchen"

Fire extinguishing capacity is rated in accordance with ANSI/UL 711: Rating and Fire Testing of Fire Extinguishers. The ratings are described using numbers preceding the class letter, such as 1-A:10-B:C. The number preceding the A multiplied by 1.25 gives the equivalent extinguishing capability in gallons of water. The number preceding the B indicates the size of fire in square feet that an ordinary user should be able to extinguish. There is no additional rating for class C, as it only indicates that the extinguishing agent will not conduct electricity, and an extinguisher will never have a rating of just C.

== Installation ==
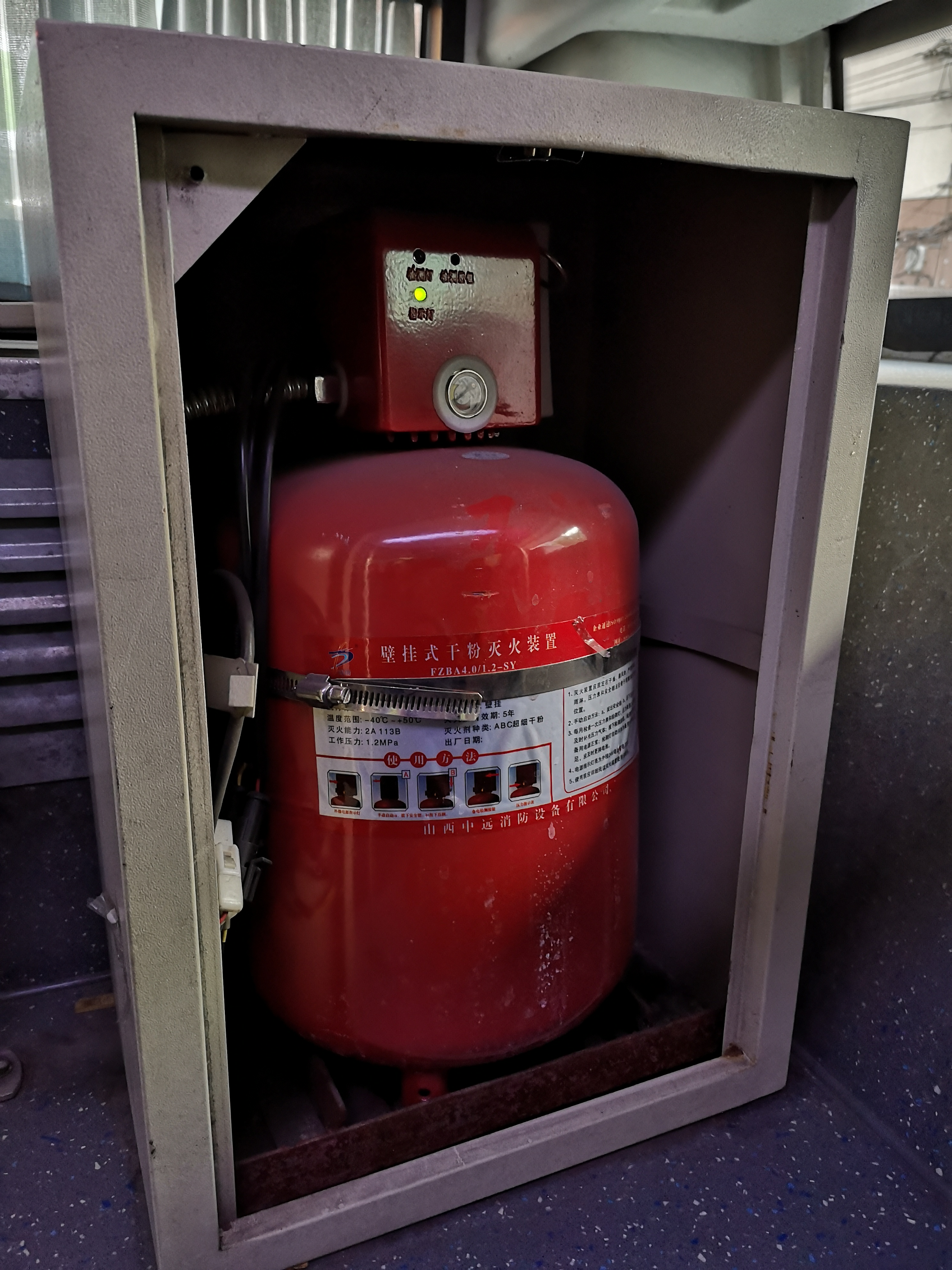
Automatic engine compartment fire extinguisher installed on a hybrid city bus

Fire extinguishers are usually fitted in buildings at an easily accessible location, such as against a wall in a high-traffic area. They are also often fitted to motor vehicles, watercraft, and aircraft – this is required by law in many jurisdictions, for identified classes of vehicles. Under NFPA 10 all commercial vehicles must carry at least one fire extinguisher, with size/UL rating depending on type of vehicle and cargo (i.e., fuel tankers usually must have a 20 lb (9.1 kg), while most others can carry a 5 lb (2.3 kg)). The revised NFPA 10 created criteria on the placement of "fast flow extinguishers" in locations such as those storing and transporting pressurized flammable liquids and pressurized flammable gas or areas with possibility of three-dimensional class B hazards are required to have "fast flow extinguishers" as required by NFPA 5.5.1.1. Varying classes of competition vehicles require fire extinguishing systems, the simplest requirements being a 1A:10BC hand-held portable extinguisher mounted to the interior of the vehicle.

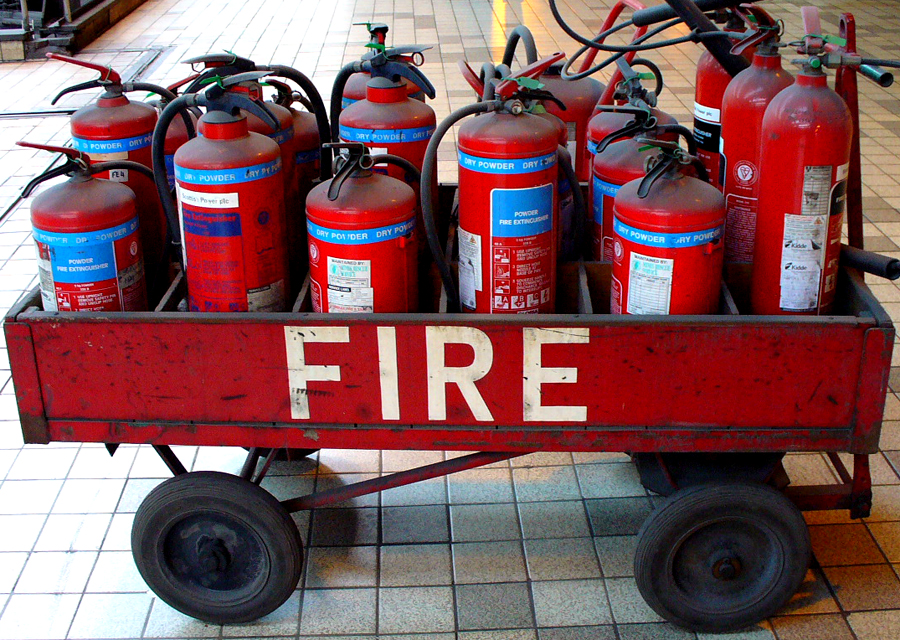
A dedicated trolley loaded with extinguishers ready to move where needed for rapid use

The height limit for installation, as determined by the NFPA, is 60 in (1.5 m) for fire extinguishers weighing less than 40 lb (18 kg). However, compliance with the Americans with Disabilities Act (ADA) also needs to be followed within the United States. The ADA height limit of the fire extinguisher, as measured at the handle, is 48 in (1.2 m). Fire extinguisher installations are also limited to protruding no more than 4 inches into the adjacent path of travel. The ADA rule states that any object adjacent to a path of travel may not project more than 4 in (10 cm) if the object's bottom leading edge is higher than 27 in (0.69 m). The 4-inch protrusion rule was designed to protect people with low-vision and those who are blind. The height limit rule of 48 inches is primarily related to access by people with wheelchairs but it is also related to other disabilities as well. Prior to 2012, the height limit was 54 in (1.4 m) for side-reach by wheelchair-accessible installations. Installations made prior to 2012 at the 54-inch height are not required to be changed.

In New Zealand, the mandatory installation of fire extinguishers in vehicles is limited to self-propelled plant in agriculture and arboriculture, passenger service vehicles with more than 12 seats and vehicles that carry flammable goods. NZ Transport Agency recommends that all company vehicles carry a fire extinguisher, including passenger cars.

Fire extinguishers mounted inside aircraft engines are called extinguishing bottles or fire bottles.

== Types of extinguishing agents ==
Different types of extinguishing agents have different modes of action, and certain ones are only appropriate for specific fire classes.

=== Dry chemical ===
This is a powder-based agent that extinguishes by separating the three parts of the fire triangle. It prevents the chemical reactions involving heat, fuel, and oxygen, thus extinguishing the fire. During combustion, the fuel breaks down into free radicals, which are highly reactive fragments of molecules that react with oxygen. The substances in dry chemical extinguishers can stop this process.

- Monoammonium phosphate, also known as ABC dry chemical, tri-class, or multipurpose, is used on class A, B and C fires. It receives its class A rating from the agent's ability to melt and flow at 190 °C (374 °F) to smother the fire. It is more corrosive than other dry chemical agents and is pale yellow in color.
- Sodium bicarbonate, regular or ordinary used on class B and C fires, was the first of the dry chemical agents developed. In the heat of a fire, it releases a cloud of carbon dioxide that smothers the fire. That is, the gas drives oxygen away from the fire, thus stopping the chemical reaction. This agent is not generally effective on class A fires because the agent is expended and the cloud of gas dissipates quickly, and if the fuel is still sufficiently hot, the fire starts up again. While liquid and gas fires do not usually store much heat in their fuel source, solid fires do. Sodium bicarbonate was very common in commercial kitchens before the advent of wet chemical agents, but now is falling out of favor as it is much less effective than wet chemical agents for class K fires, less effective than Purple-K for class B fires, and is ineffective on class A fires. White or blue in color.
- Potassium bicarbonate (principal constituent of Purple-K), used on class B and C fires. About two times as effective on class B fires as sodium bicarbonate, it is the preferred dry chemical agent of the oil and gas industry. The only dry chemical agent certified for use in ARFF by the NFPA. Colored violet to distinguish it.
- Potassium bicarbonate & Urea Complex (AKA Monnex), used on class B and C fires. More effective than all other powders due to its ability to decrepitate (where the powder breaks up into smaller particles) in the flame zone creating a larger surface area for free radical inhibition. Grey in color.
- Potassium chloride, or Super-K, dry chemical was developed in an effort to create a high efficiency, protein-foam compatible dry chemical. Developed in the 1960s, prior to Purple-K, it was never as popular as other agents since, being a salt, it was quite corrosive. For B and C fires, white in color.
- Foam-compatible, which is a sodium bicarbonate (BC) based dry chemical, was developed for use with protein foams for fighting class B fires. Most dry chemicals contain metal stearates to waterproof them, but these will tend to destroy the foam blanket created by protein (animal) based foams. Foam compatible type uses silicone as a waterproofing agent, which does not harm foam. Effectiveness is identical to regular dry chemical, and it is light green in color (some ANSUL brand formulations are blue). This agent is generally no longer used since most modern dry chemicals are considered compatible with synthetic foams such as aqueous film forming foams (AFFF).
- MET-L-KYL / PYROKYL is a specialty variation of sodium bicarbonate for fighting pyrophoric (ignites on contact with air) liquid fires. In addition to sodium bicarbonate, it also contains silica gel particles. The sodium bicarbonate interrupts the chain reaction of the fuel and the silica soaks up any unburned fuel, preventing contact with air. It is effective on other class B fuels as well. Blue/red in color.
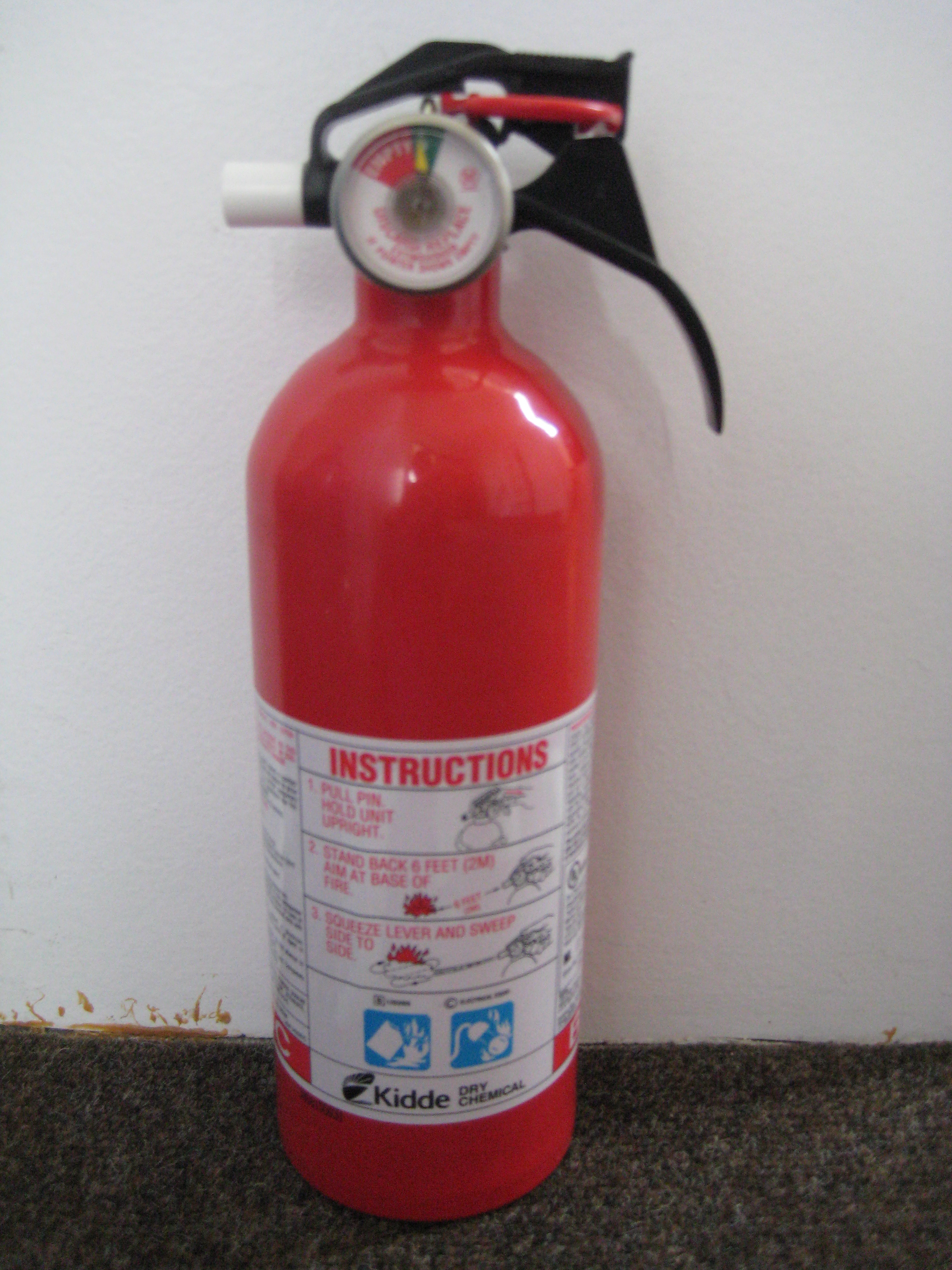
A small, disposable sodium bicarbonate dry chemical unit intended for home kitchen use

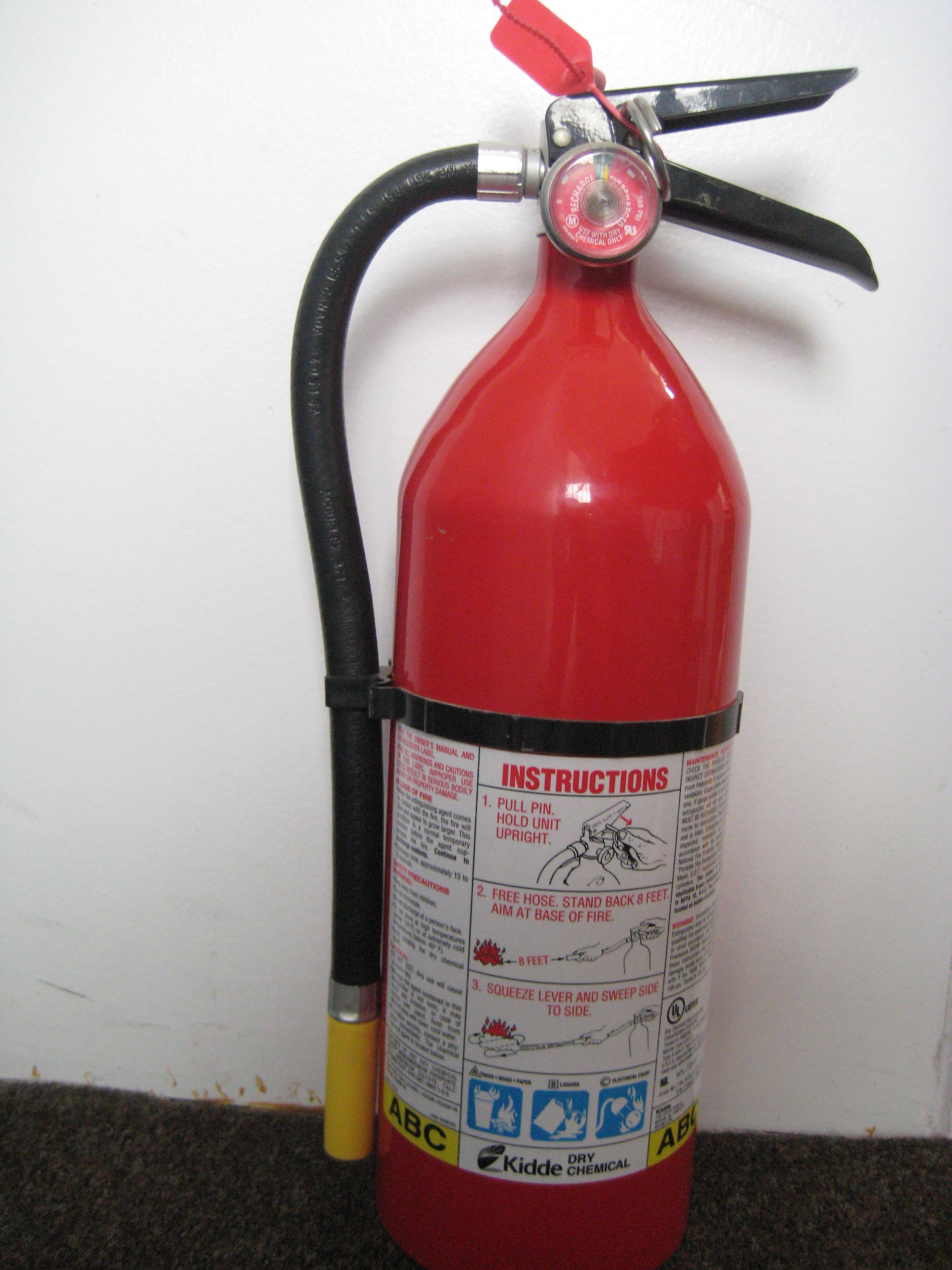
A typical dry chemical extinguisher containing 5 lb (2.3 kg) of monoammonium phosphate dry chemical

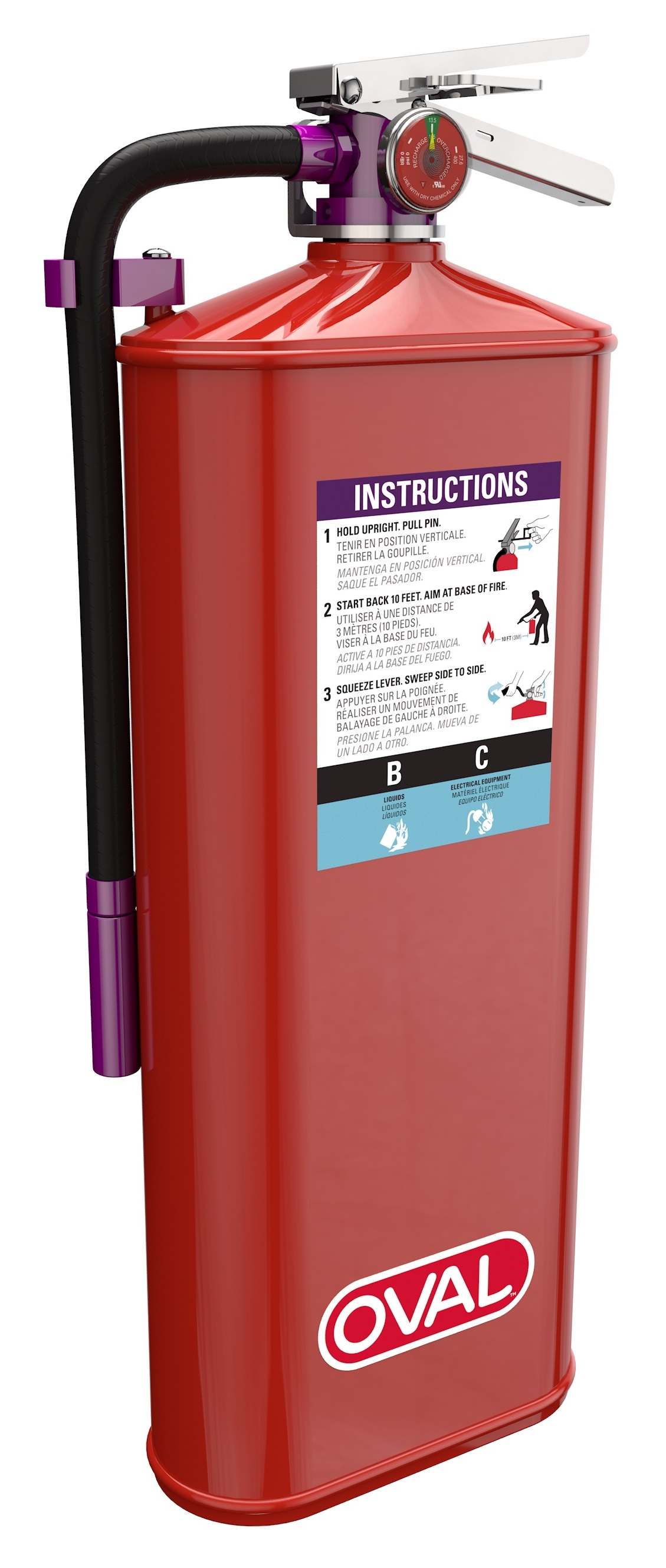
A 10 lb (4.5 kg) stored pressure purple-K fire extinguisher

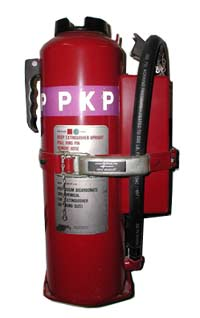
An 18 lb (8.2 kg) US Navy cartridge-operated purple-K dry chemical (potassium bicarbonate) extinguisher

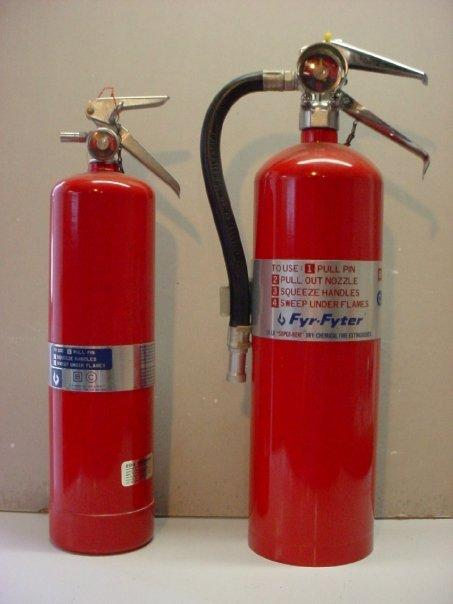
Two Super-K (potassium chloride) extinguishers

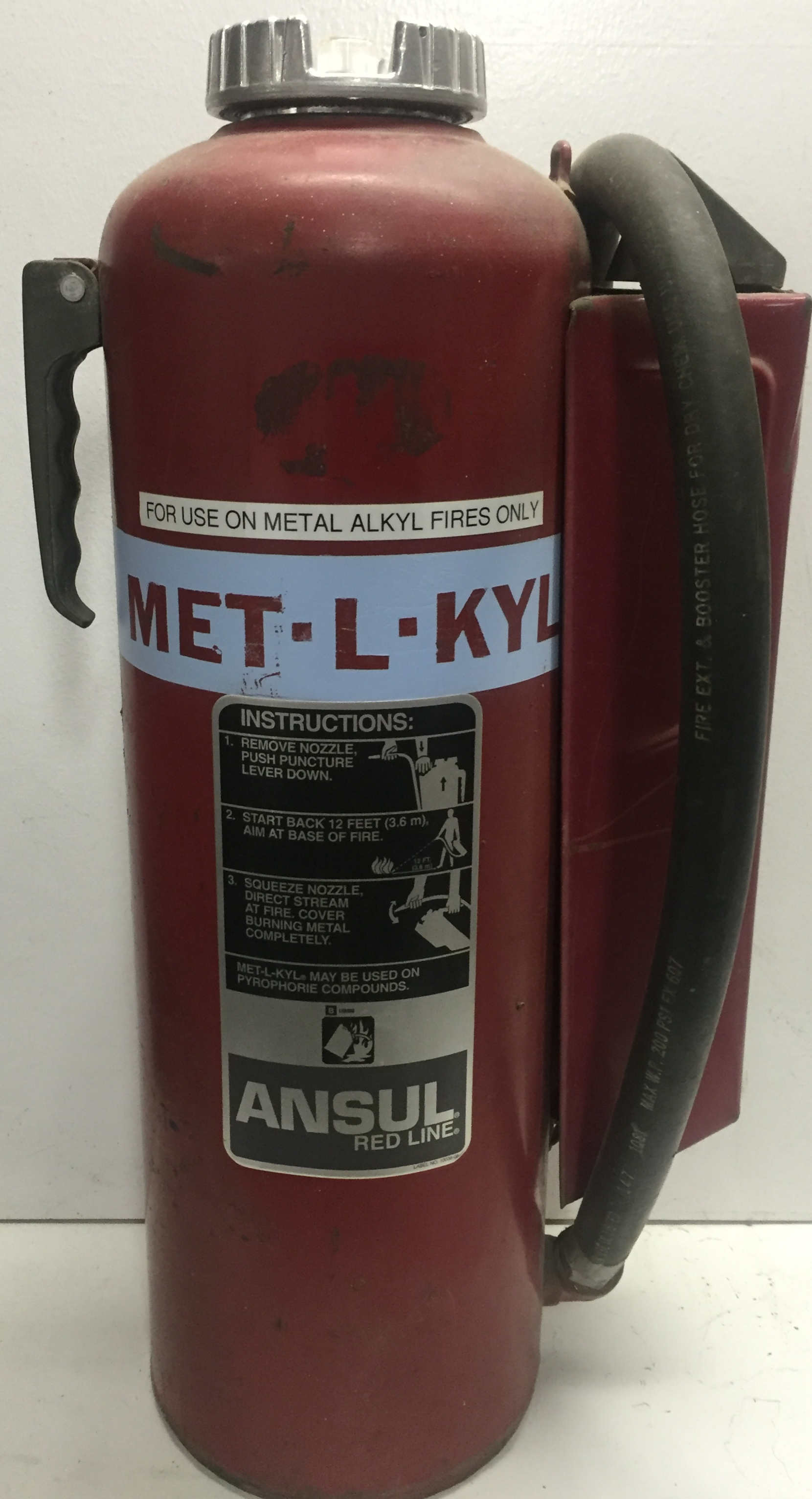
Met-L-Kyl cartridge-operated fire extinguisher for pyrophoric liquid fires

=== Foams ===
Applied to fuel fires as either an aspirated (mixed and expanded with air in a branch pipe) or nonaspirated form to create a frothy blanket or seal over the fuel, preventing oxygen reaching it. Unlike powder, foam can be used to progressively extinguish fires without flashback.

- Aqueous film-forming foam (AFFF), used on A and B fires and for vapor suppression. The most common type is portable foam extinguishers. AFFF was developed in the 1960s under Project Light Water in a joint venture between 3M and the U.S. Navy. AFFF forms a film that floats out before the foam blanket, sealing the surface and smothering the fire by excluding oxygen. AFFF is widely used for ARFF firefighting at airports, often in conjunction with purple-K dry chemical. It contains fluoro-tensides which can be accumulated in the human body. The long-term effects of this on the human body and environment are unclear at this time. AFFF can be discharged through an air-aspirating branchpipe nozzle or a spray nozzle and is now produced only in pre-mix form, where the foam concentrate is stored mixed with water. In the past, as solid charge model was produced, the AFFF concentrate was housed as a dry compound in an external, disposable cartridge in a specially designed nozzle. The extinguisher body was charged with plain water, and the discharge pressure mixed the foam concentrate with the water upon squeezing the lever. These extinguishers received double the rating of a pre-mix model (40-B instead of 20-B), but are now considered obsolete, as parts and refill cartridges have been discontinued by the manufacturer. European regulations require the phasing out of AFFF foams containing persistent organic pollutants. These include PFAS (Per and PolyFluoroAlkylated Substances), PFOA (PerFluoroOctanoic Acid), its salts or PFOA related compounds, and PFOS (PerFluoroOctane Sulphonic acid), its salts or PFOS related compounds. Related derogations allowing delay of their removal are to end on 4 July 2025. As of April 2024, listed foam extinguishers using traditional AFFF formulas are no longer being produced for the US market, with Amerex announcing their exit from manufacturing foam extinguishers in December 2021, and Badger in March 2024, respectively. Once existing stocks of charges and parts are depleted, the UL listings on these units will be void and they will require replacement with other extinguisher types. Buckeye has announced that they will be producing models FFE-6L and FFE-2.5 as of April 2024, using 3% AFFF premix (C6 Platinum Plus concentrate) extinguishers with aspirating nozzles that contain no PFOS and less than 10 ppb PFOA, with greener formulas to come in the future, though they do not seem to be available online as of April 2024.
- Alcohol-resistant aqueous film-forming foams (AR-AFFF), used on liquid fuel fires containing alcohol or other water-miscible flammable or combustible liquids (polar solvents). Forms a membrane between the fuel and the foam preventing the alcohol from breaking down the foam blanket. As of April 2024, listed foam extinguishers using traditional AR-AFFF formulas are no longer being produced for the US market, with Amerex announcing their exit from manufacturing foam extinguishers in December 2021, and Badger in March 2024, respectively. Once existing stocks of charges and parts are depleted, the UL listings on these units will be void and they will require replacement with other extinguisher types.
- Film-forming fluoroprotein (FFFP) contains naturally occurring proteins from animal by-products and synthetic film-forming agents to create a foam blanket that is more heat resistant than the strictly synthetic AFFF foams. FFFP works well on alcohol-based liquids and is used widely in motorsports. As of 2016, Amerex has discontinued production of FFFP, instead using AR-AFFF made by Solberg. Existing model 252 FFFP units could maintain their UL listing by using the new charge, prior to the Amerex completely exiting the foam market in December 2021. These units will be obsolete as soon as existing recharge agent stocks are depleted.
- Compressed air foam system (CAFS): The CAFS extinguisher (example: TRI-MAX Mini-CAF) differs from a standard stored-pressure premix foam extinguisher in that it operates at a higher pressure of 140 psi, aerates the foam with an attached compressed gas cylinder instead of an air-aspirating nozzle, and uses a drier foam solution with a higher concentrate-to-water ratio. Generally used to extend a water supply in wildland operations. Used on class A fires and with very dry foam on class B for vapor suppression. These are very expensive, special purpose extinguishers typically used by fire departments or other safety professionals.
- Arctic Fire is a liquid fire extinguishing agent that emulsifies and cools heated materials more quickly than water or ordinary foam. It is used extensively in the steel industry. Effective on classes A, B, and D.
- FireAde is a foaming agent that emulsifies burning liquids and renders them non-flammable. It is able to cool heated material and surfaces similar to CAFS. Used on A and B (said to be effective on some class D hazards, although not recommended due to the fact that fireade still contains amounts of water which will react with some metal fires).
- Cold Fire is an organic, eco-friendly wetting agent that works by cooling, and by encapsulating the hydrocarbon fuel, which prevents it from entering into the combustion reaction. Bulk Cold Fire is used in booster tanks and is acceptable for use in CAFS systems. Cold Fire is UL listed for A and B fires only. Aerosol versions are preferred by users for cars, boats, RVs, and kitchens. Used primarily by law enforcement, fire departments, EMS, and the racing industry across North America. Cold Fire offered Amerex equipment (converted 252 and 254 models) prior to their exit from the foam market in December 2021, as well as imported equipment in smaller sizes.
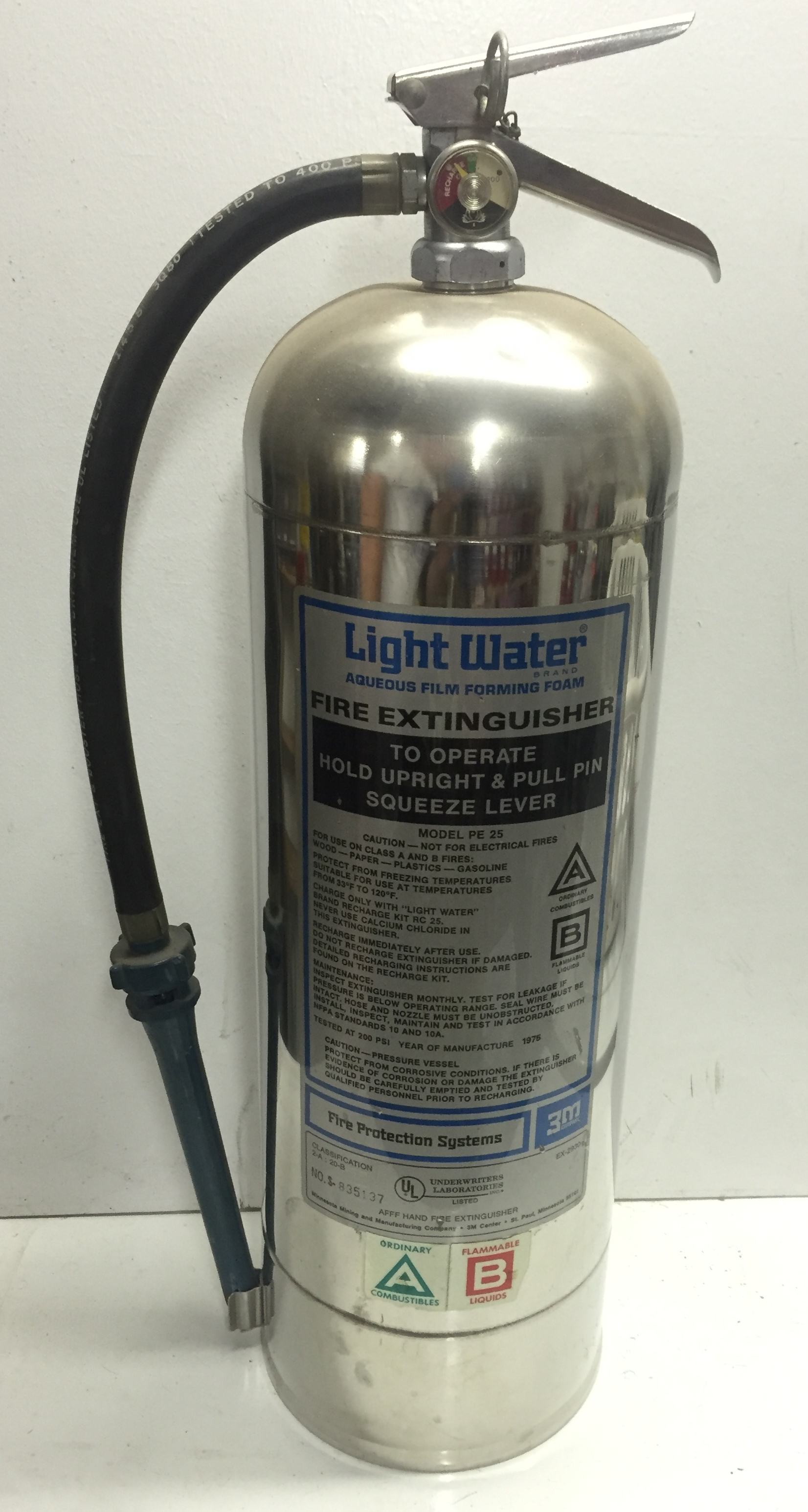
1970s Light Water AFFF foam fire extinguisher

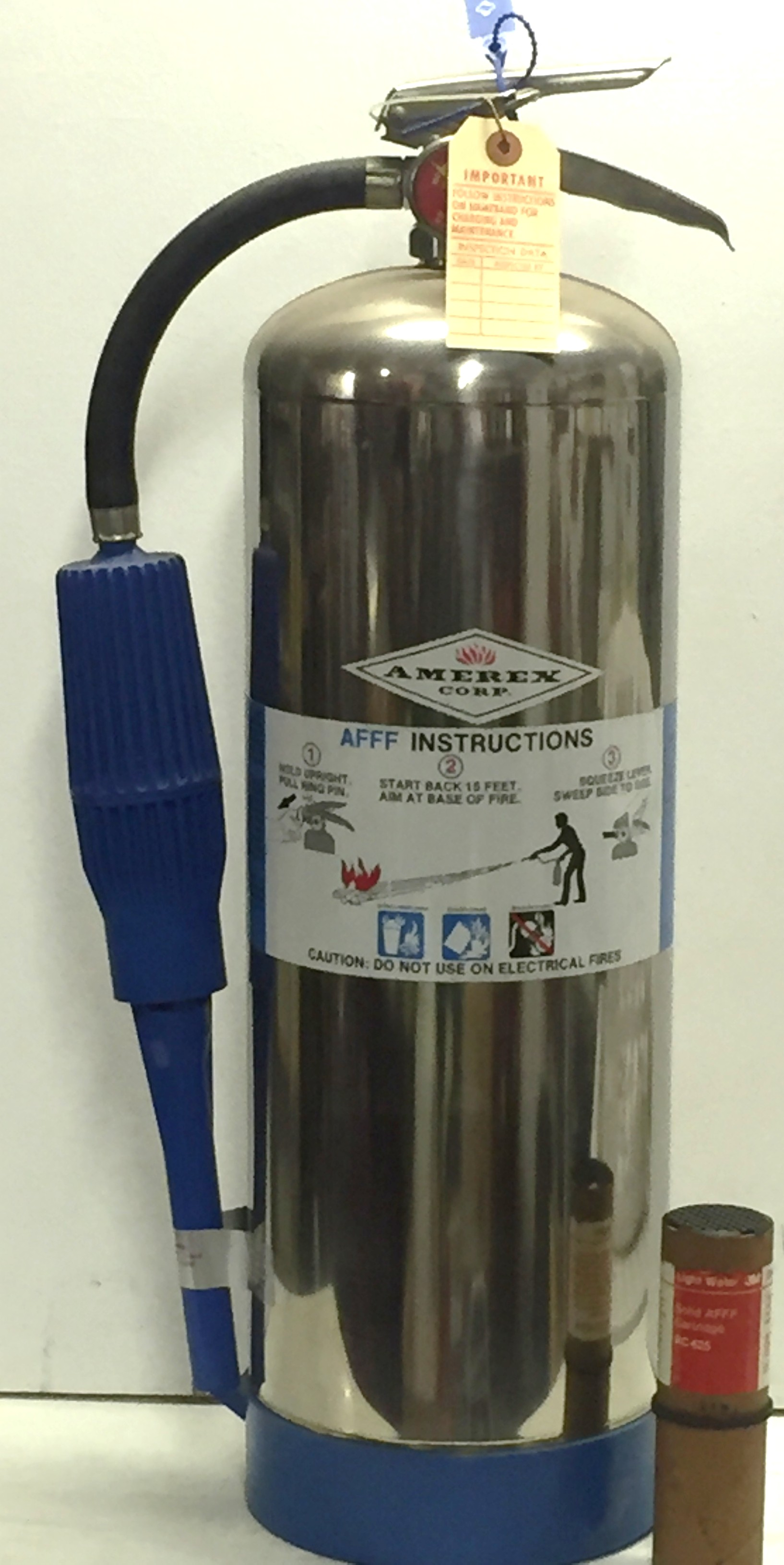
Amerex Solid-Charge AFFF Fire Extinguisher, 1980s (obsolete)

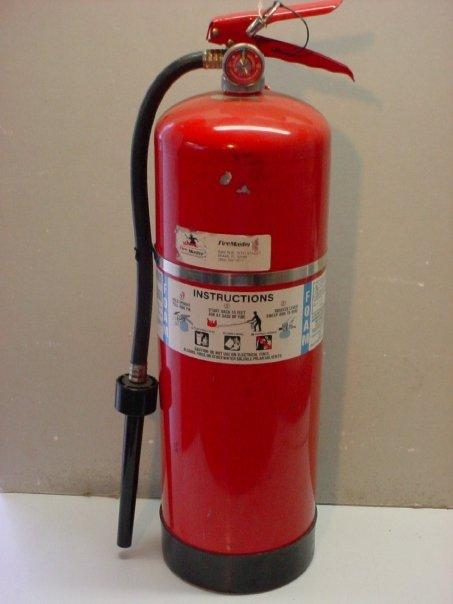
A 2.5 US gal (9.5 L) USCG-approved 2 1/2-gallon AFFF foam fire extinguisher

=== Water types ===
Water cools burning carbonaceous material and is very effective against fires in furniture, fabrics, etc. (including deep-seated fires). Water-based extinguishers cannot be used safely on energized electrical fires or flammable liquid fires.

- Pump-Type water extinguisher typically consist of a 2-1/2 or 5-gallon non-pressurized metal or plastic container with a pump mounted to it, as well as a discharge hose and nozzle. Pump type water extinguishers are often used where freezing conditions may occur, as they can be economically freeze-protected with calcium chloride (except stainless steel models), such as barns, outbuildings and unheated warehouses. They are also useful where many, frequent spot fires may occur, such as during fire watch for hot work operations. They are dependent on the user's strength to produce a decent discharge stream for firefighting. Water and antifreeze are the most common, but loaded stream and foam designs were made in the past. Backpack models exist for wildland firefighting and may be solid material such as metal or fiberglass, or collapsible vinyl or rubber bags for ease of storage.
- Stored pressure water cools burning material by absorbing heat via conversion of liquid water to steam. Effective on class A fires, it has the advantage of being inexpensive, harmless, and relatively easy to clean up. In the United States, stored pressure units contain 2-1/2 gallons of water in a stainless steel cylinder. In Europe, they are typically mild steel, lined with polyethylene, painted red and contain 6–9 L (1.6–2.4 US gal) of water.
- Water mist uses a fine misting nozzle to break up a stream of de-ionized (minerals removed by reverse osmosis or resin column ion exchange) water to the point of not conducting electricity back to the operator. Class A and C rated. It is used widely in hospitals and MRI facilities because it is both completely non-toxic and does not cause cardiac sensitization like some gaseous clean agents. These extinguishers come in 1-3/4 and 2-1/2 gallon sizes, painted white in the United States. Models used in MRI facilities are non-magnetic and are safe for use inside the room that the MRI machine is operating. Models available in Europe come in smaller sizes as well, and some even carry a Class F rating for commercial kitchens, essentially using steam to smother the fire and the water content to cool the oil.

Additives can be used to alter the properties of water extinguishers, though additives not specified by the manufacturer will void the extinguisher's listing. These include:

- Wetting agents: Detergent based additives used to break the surface tension of water and improve penetration of deep-seated class A fires.
- Antifreeze chemicals added to water to lower its freezing point to about −40 °C (−40 °F). Has no appreciable effect on extinguishing performance. Can be glycol based or loaded stream, see below.
- Loaded Stream: An alkali metal salt solution added to water to lower its freezing point to about −40 °C (−40 °F). Loaded stream is basically concentrated wet chemical, discharged through a straight stream nozzle, intended for class A fires. In addition to lowering the freezing point of the water, loaded stream also increases penetration into dense class A materials and will give a slight class B rating (rated 1-B in the past), though current loaded stream extinguishers are rated only 2-A. Loaded Stream is very corrosive; extinguishers containing this agent must be recharged annually to check for corrosion.
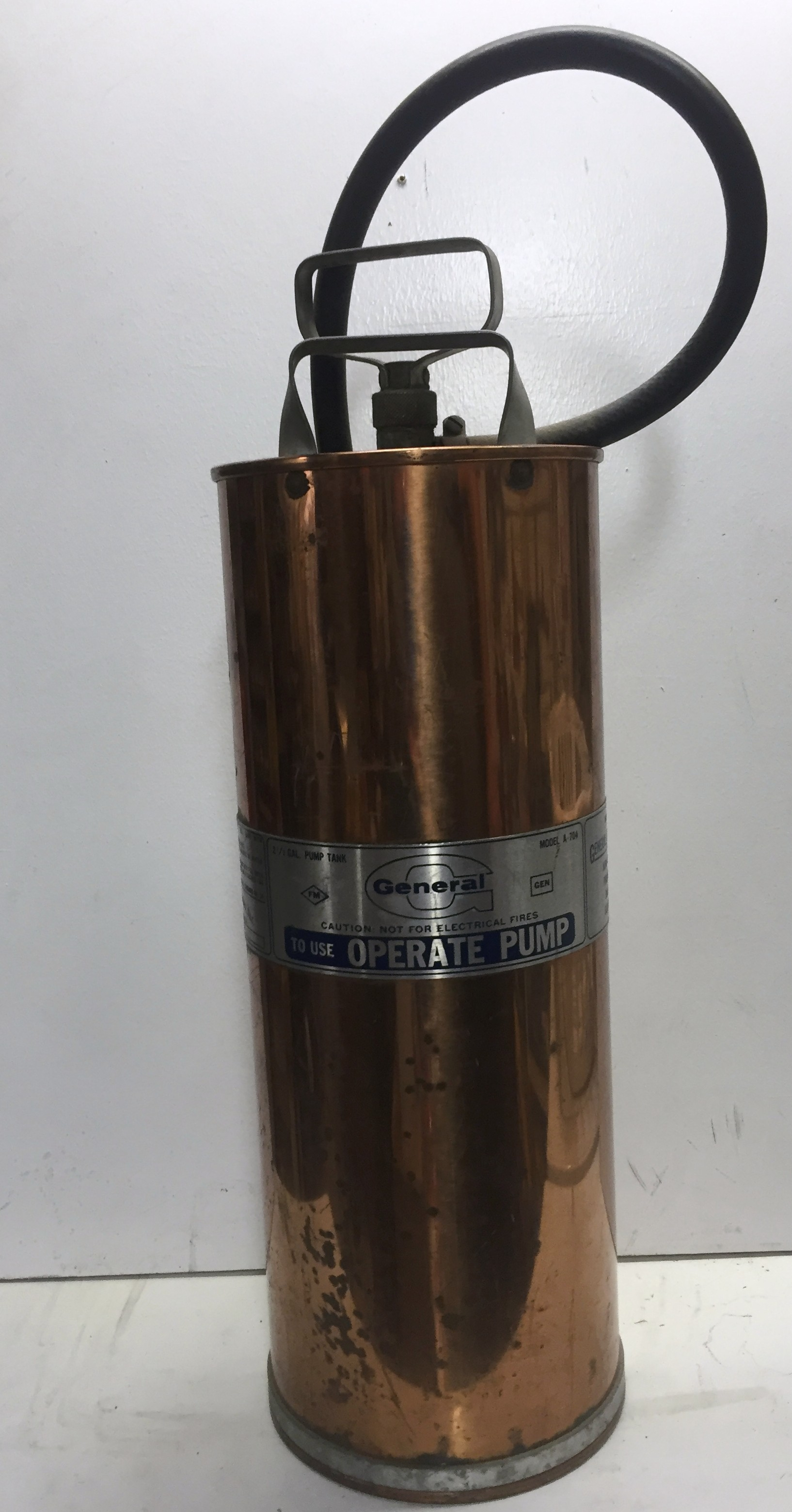
General 2.5 gal. pump-type water fire extinguisher, 1960s, US

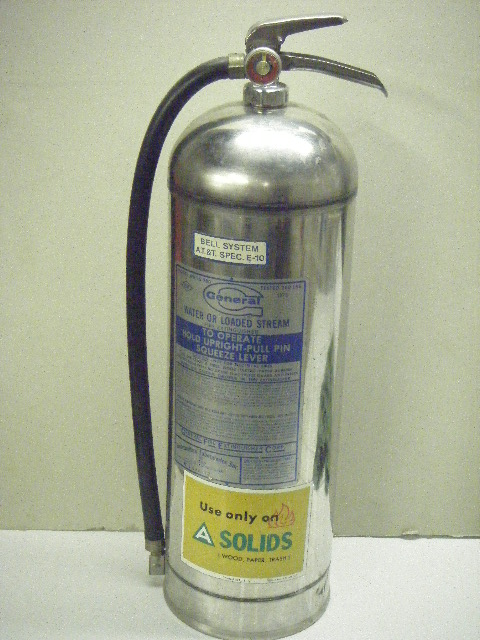
Stored pressure water extinguisher

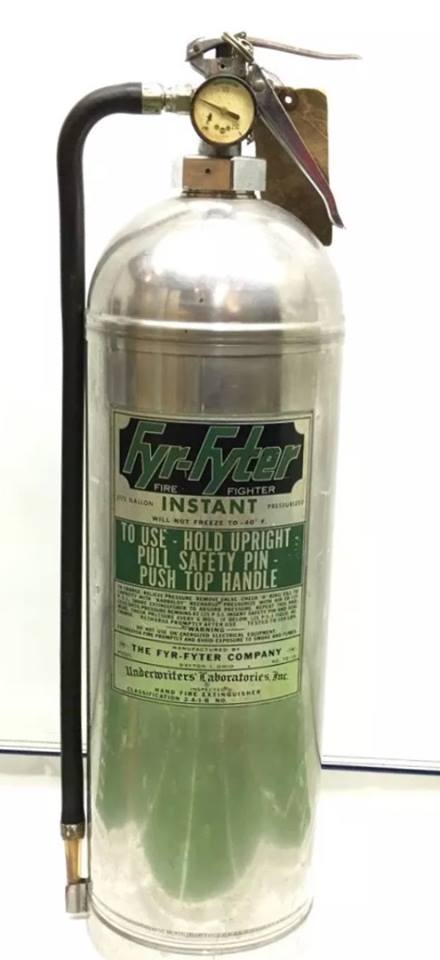
Stored pressure loaded stream fire extinguisher

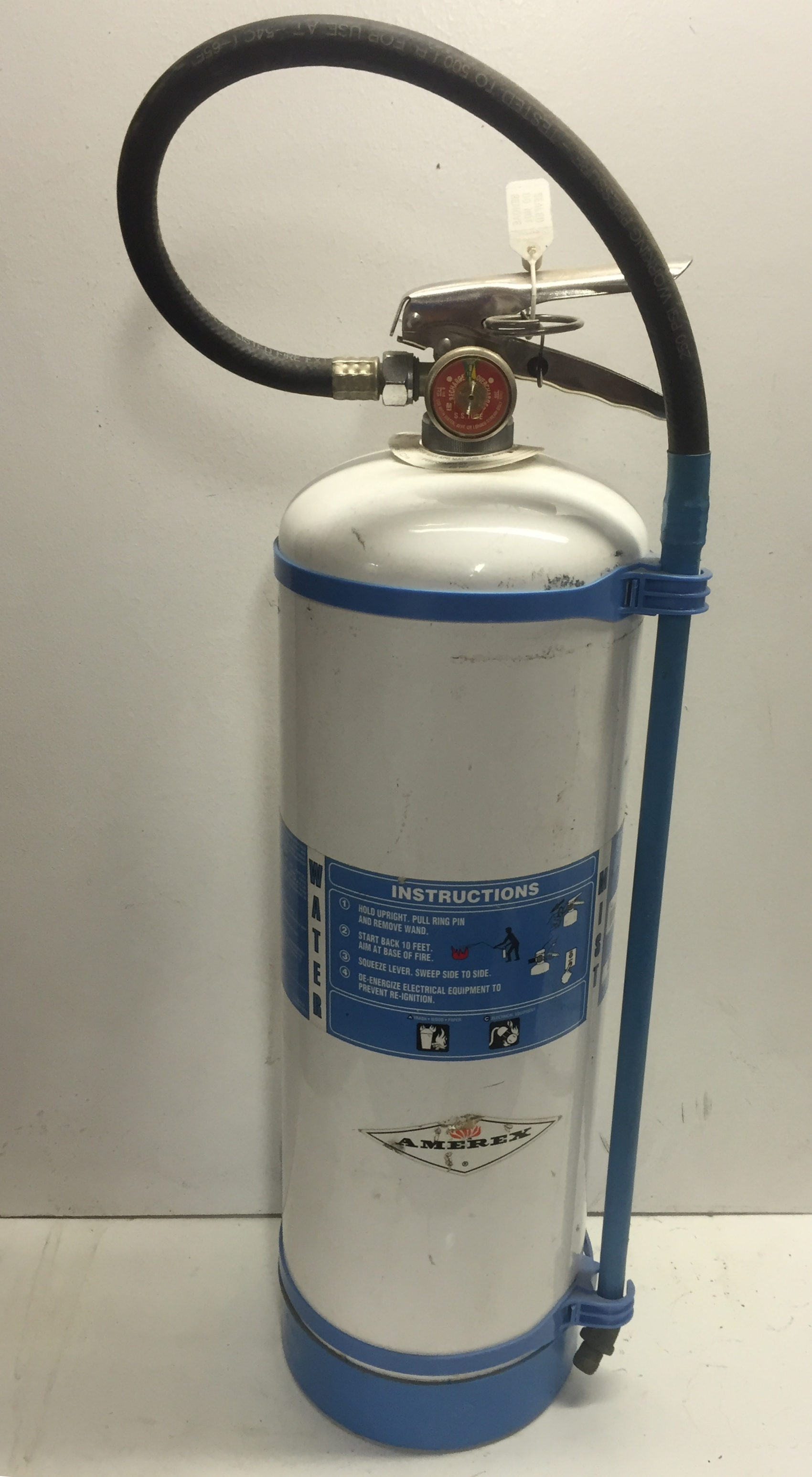
2.5 gallon water mist fire extinguisher for medical and MRI facilities

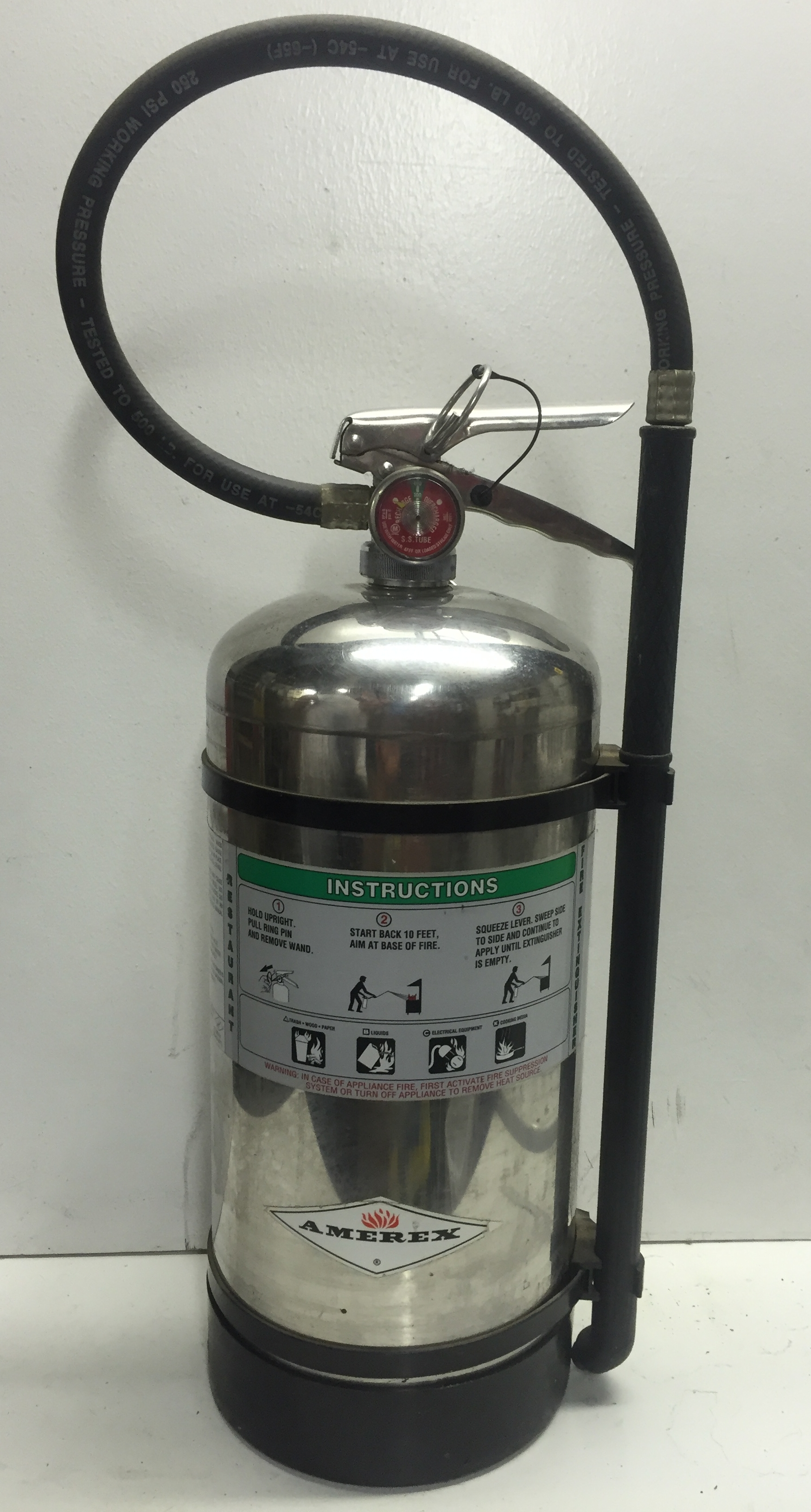
6-liter wet chemical fire extinguisher for use in commercial kitchens

Indian five gallon backpack pump tank for wildland firefighting, US

Plastic tank Indian five gallon pump fire extinguisher

=== Wet chemical types ===
Wet chemical (potassium acetate, potassium carbonate, or potassium citrate) extinguishes the fire by forming an air-excluding soapy foam blanket over the burning oil through the chemical process of saponification (a base reacting with a fat to form a soap) and by the water content cooling the oil below its ignition temperature. Generally, class A and K (F in Europe) only, although older models also achieved class B and C fire-fighting capability in the past, current models are rated A:K (Amerex, Ansul, Buckeye and Strike First) or K only (Badger/Kidde).

=== Clean agents ===
Clean agents extinguish fire by displacing oxygen (CO_{2} or inert gases), removing heat from the combustion zone (Halotron I, FE-36, Novec 1230) or inhibiting the chemical chain reaction (Halons, Halotron BrX). They are referred to as clean agents because they do not leave any residue after discharge, which is ideal for protecting sensitive electronics, aircraft, armored vehicles and archival storage, museums, and valuable documents.

- Halon (including Halon 1211 and Halon 1301), are gaseous agents that inhibit the chemical reaction of the fire. Classes B:C for 1301 and smaller 1211 fire extinguishers (2.3 kg; under 9 lbs) and A:B:C for larger units (9–17 lb or 4.1–7.7 kg). Halon gases are banned from new production under the Montreal Protocol, as of January 1, 1994, as its properties contribute to ozone depletion and long atmospheric lifetime, usually 400 years. Halon may be recycled and used to fill newly manufactured cylinders, however, only Amerex continues to do this. The rest of the industry has moved to halon alternatives, nevertheless, Halon 1211 is still vital to certain military and industrial users, so there is a need for it. Halon was completely banned in Europe and Australia, except for critical users like law enforcement and aviation, resulting in stockpiles either being destroyed via high heat incineration or being sent to the United States for reuse. Halon 1301 and 1211 are being replaced with new halocarbon agents which have no ozone depletion properties and low atmospheric lifetimes, but are less effective. Halon 2402 is a liquid agent (dibromotetrafluoroethane) which has had limited use in the West due to its higher toxicity than 1211 or 1301. It is widely used in Russia and parts of Asia, and it was used by Kidde's Italian branch, marketed under the name "Fluobrene".
- Halon replacements include HCFC Blend B (Halotron I), HFC-227ea (FM-200), HFC-236fa (FE-36), FK 5-1-2, and Stabilized BTP (Halotron BrX; 2-bromo-3,3,3-trifluoro-1-propene). Halotron-1 was approved by the FAA for use in aircraft cabins in 2010. Considerations for halon replacement include human toxicity when used in confined spaces, ozone depleting potential, and greenhouse warming potential. The three recommended agents meet minimum performance standards, but uptake has been slow because of disadvantages. Specifically, they require two to three times the concentration to extinguish a fire compared with Halon 1211. They are heavier than halon, require a larger bottle because they are less effective, and have greenhouse gas potential. Research continues to find better alternatives.

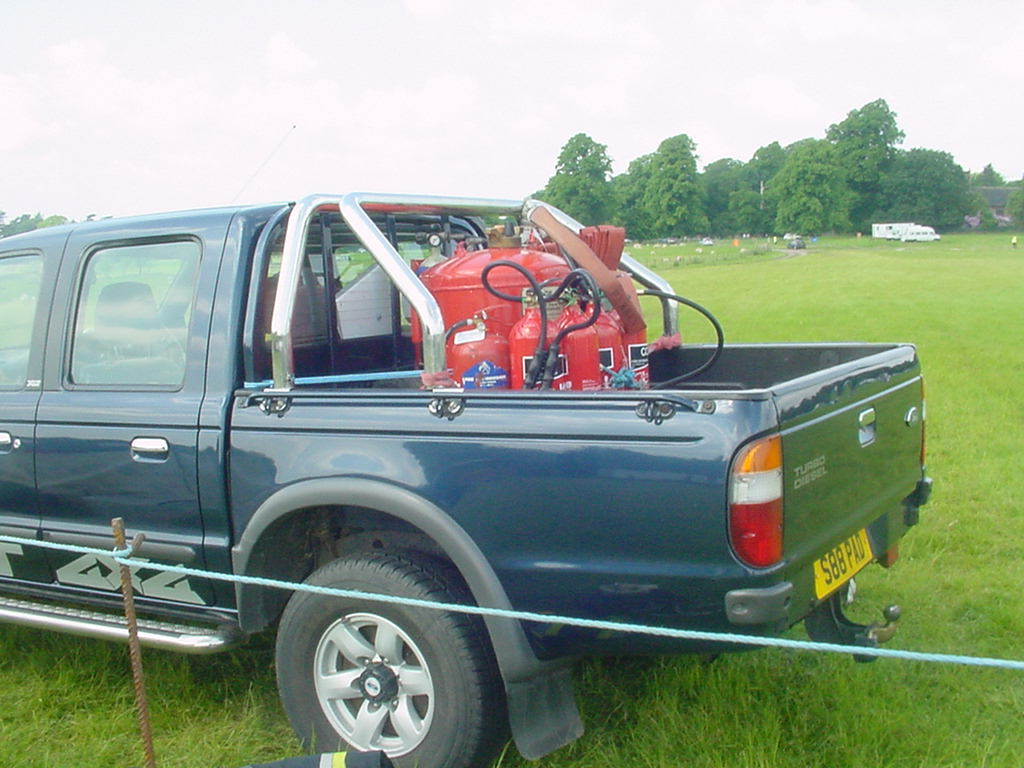
Heavy-duty CO_{2}-powered fire extinguisher on standby at a temporary helicopter landing site

- CO_{2}, a clean gaseous agent which displaces oxygen. Highest rating for 20 lb (9.1 kg) portable CO_{2} extinguishers is 10B:C. Not intended for class A fires, as the high-pressure cloud of gas can scatter burning materials. CO_{2} is not suitable for use on fires containing their own oxygen source, metals or cooking media, and may cause frostbite and suffocation if used on human beings.
- Novec 1230 fluid (AKA dry water, or Saffire fluid), a fluorinated ketone that works by removing massive amounts of heat. Available in fixed systems (various manufacturers), portables (Ansul Cleanguard+) wheeled units (Amerex)in the US and in portables (Tyco/Johnson Controls Sapphire) in Australia. Unlike other clean agents, this one has the advantage of being a liquid at atmospheric pressure and can be discharged as a stream or a rapidly vaporizing mist, depending on application.
- Potassium aerosol particle-generator, contains a form of solid potassium salts and other chemicals referred to as aerosol-forming compounds (AFC). The AFC is activated by an electric current or other thermodynamic exchange which causes the AFC to ignite. The majority of installed currently are fixed units due to the possibility of harm to the user from the heat generated by the AFC generator.
- E-36 Cryotec, a type of high concentration, high-pressure wet chemical (potassium acetate and water), it is being used by the U.S. Military in applications like the Abrams tank to replace the aging Halon 1301 units previously installed, and due to the ineffectiveness of Halon 1301 on commonplace air filter fires that occur in this vehicle.
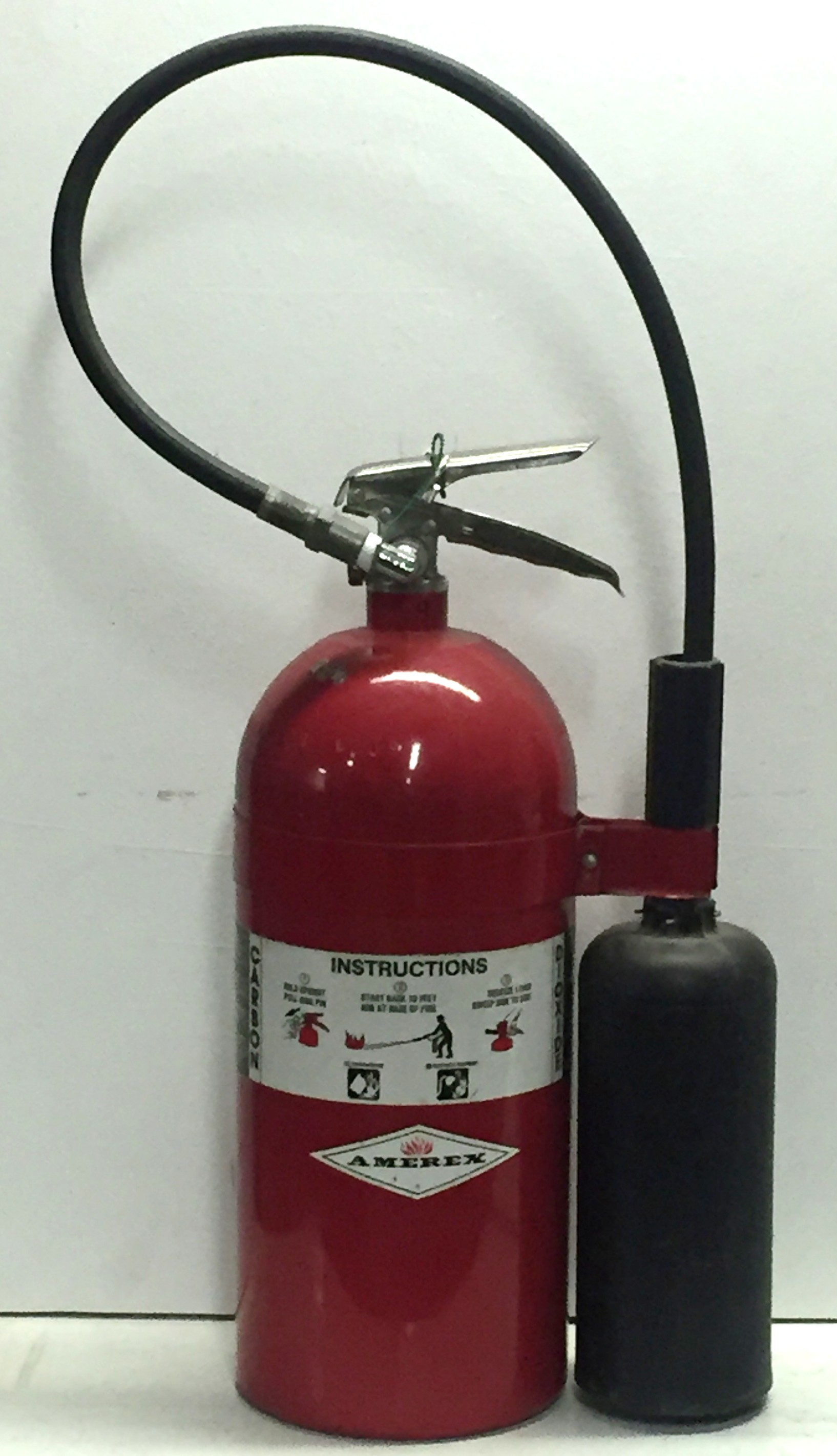
Amerex 10lb. CO_{2} Fire Extinguisher, Circa 1989, US

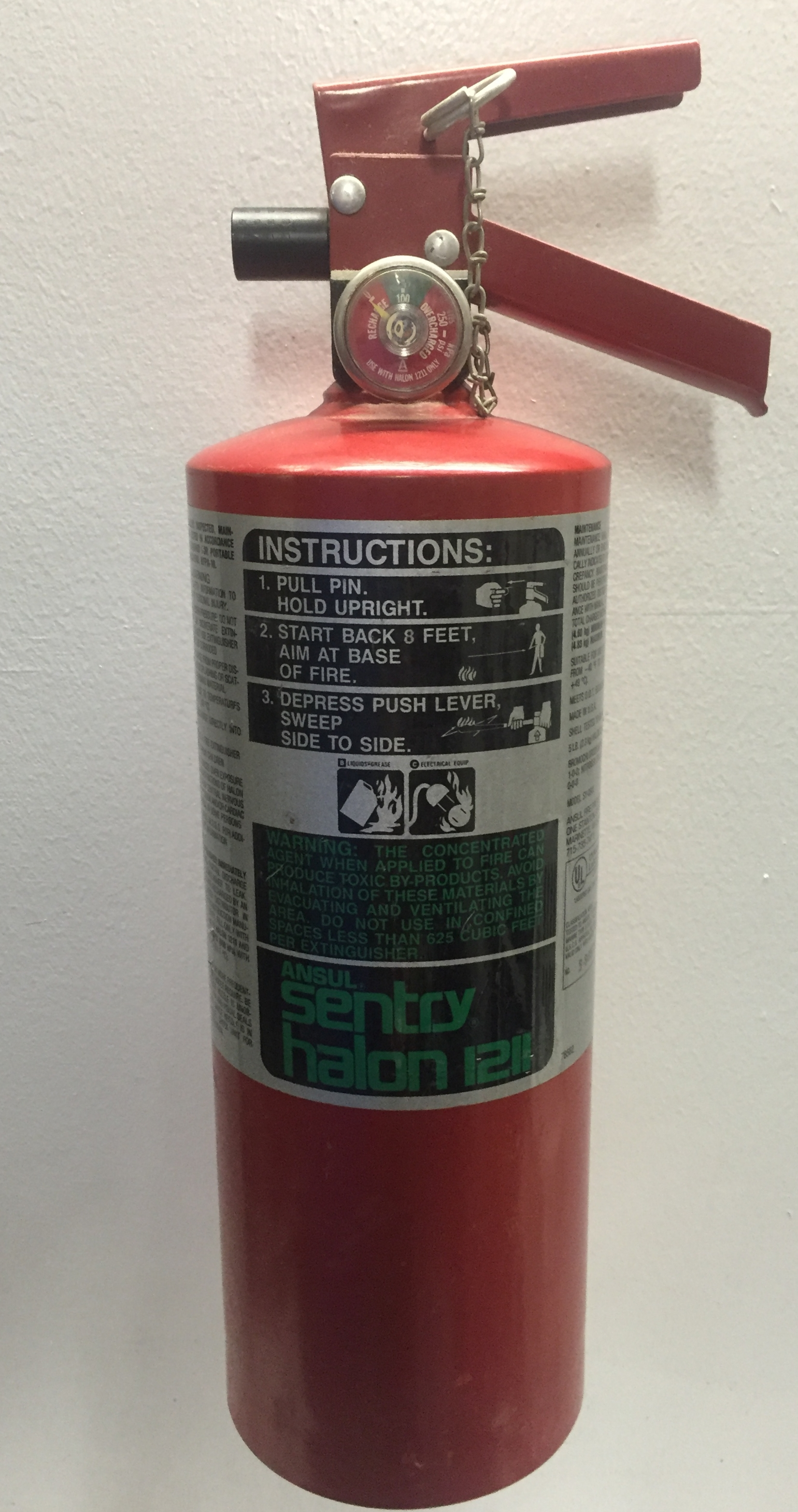
Halon 1211 Fire Extinguisher

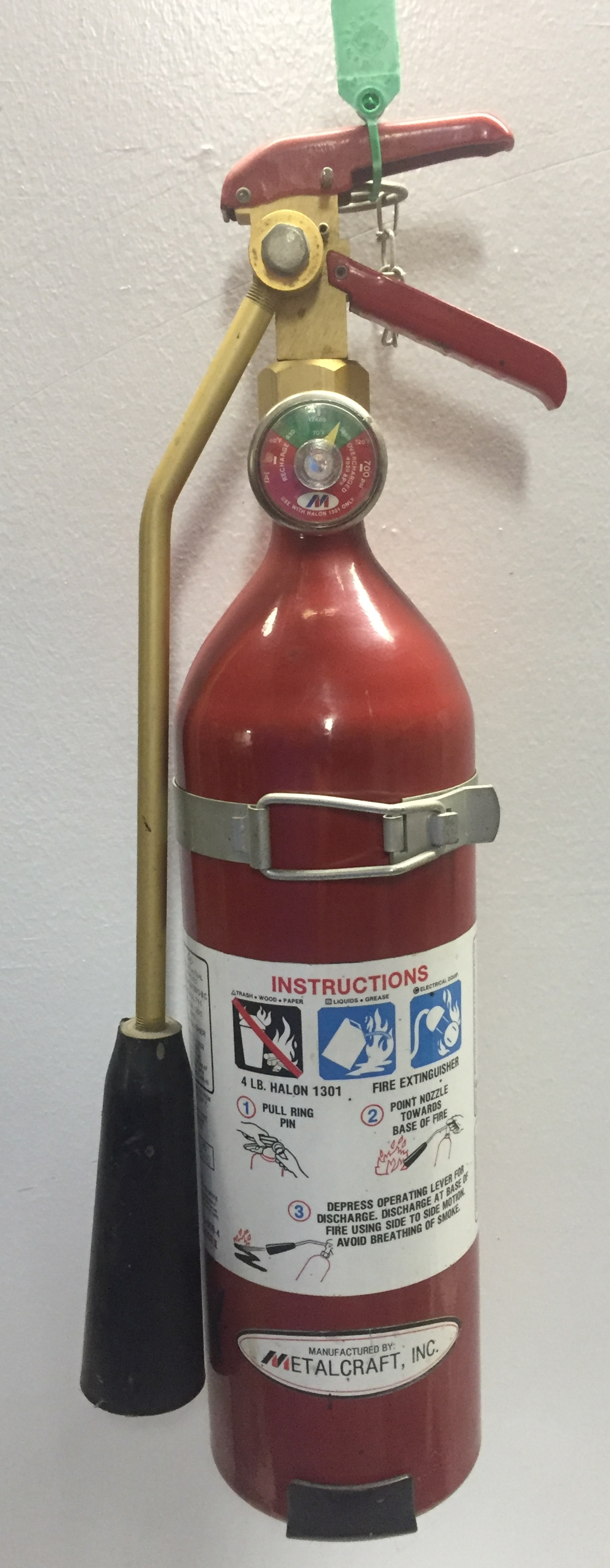
Halon 1301 Fire Extinguisher

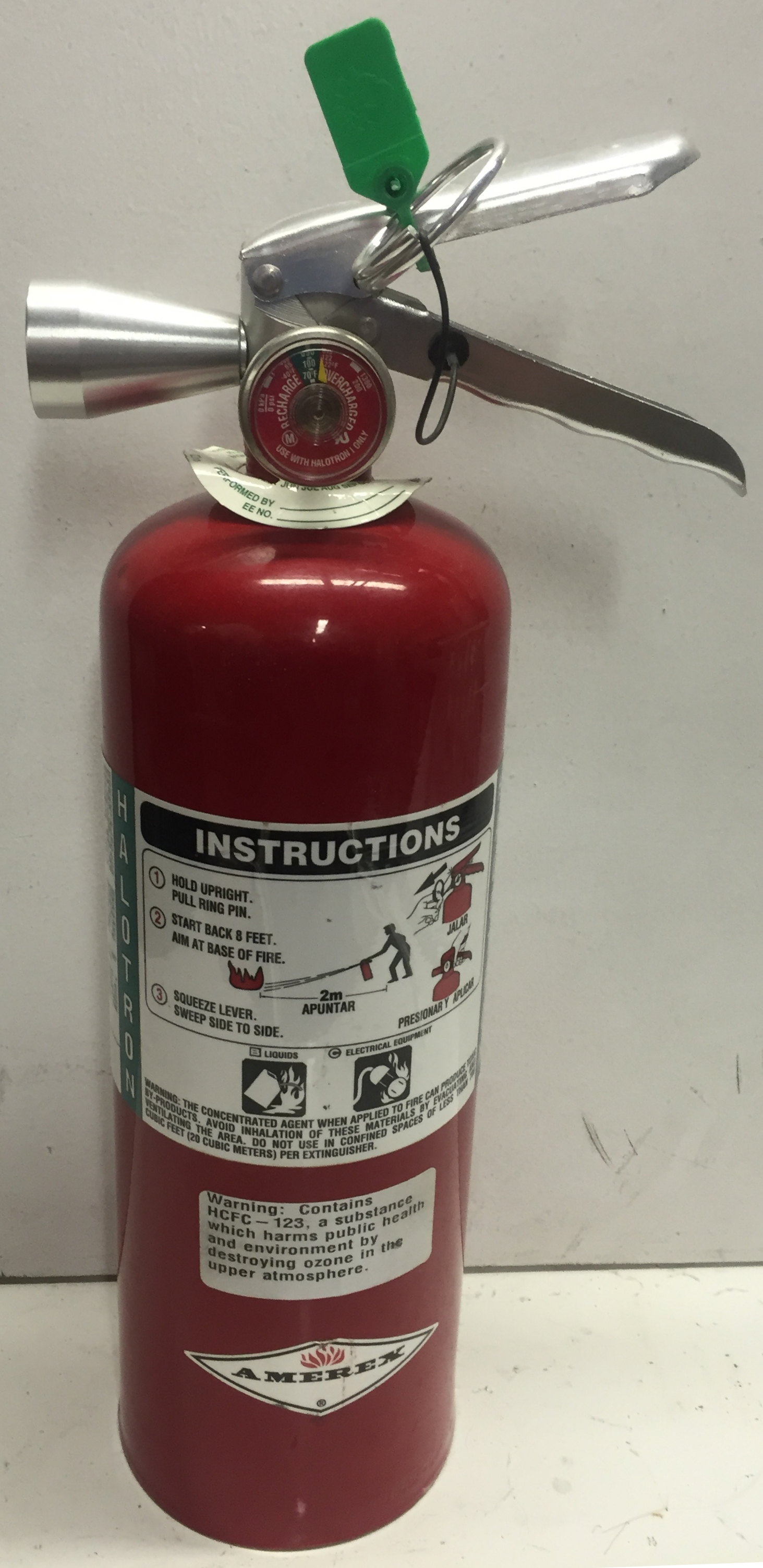
5lb. Halotron-1 fire extinguisher

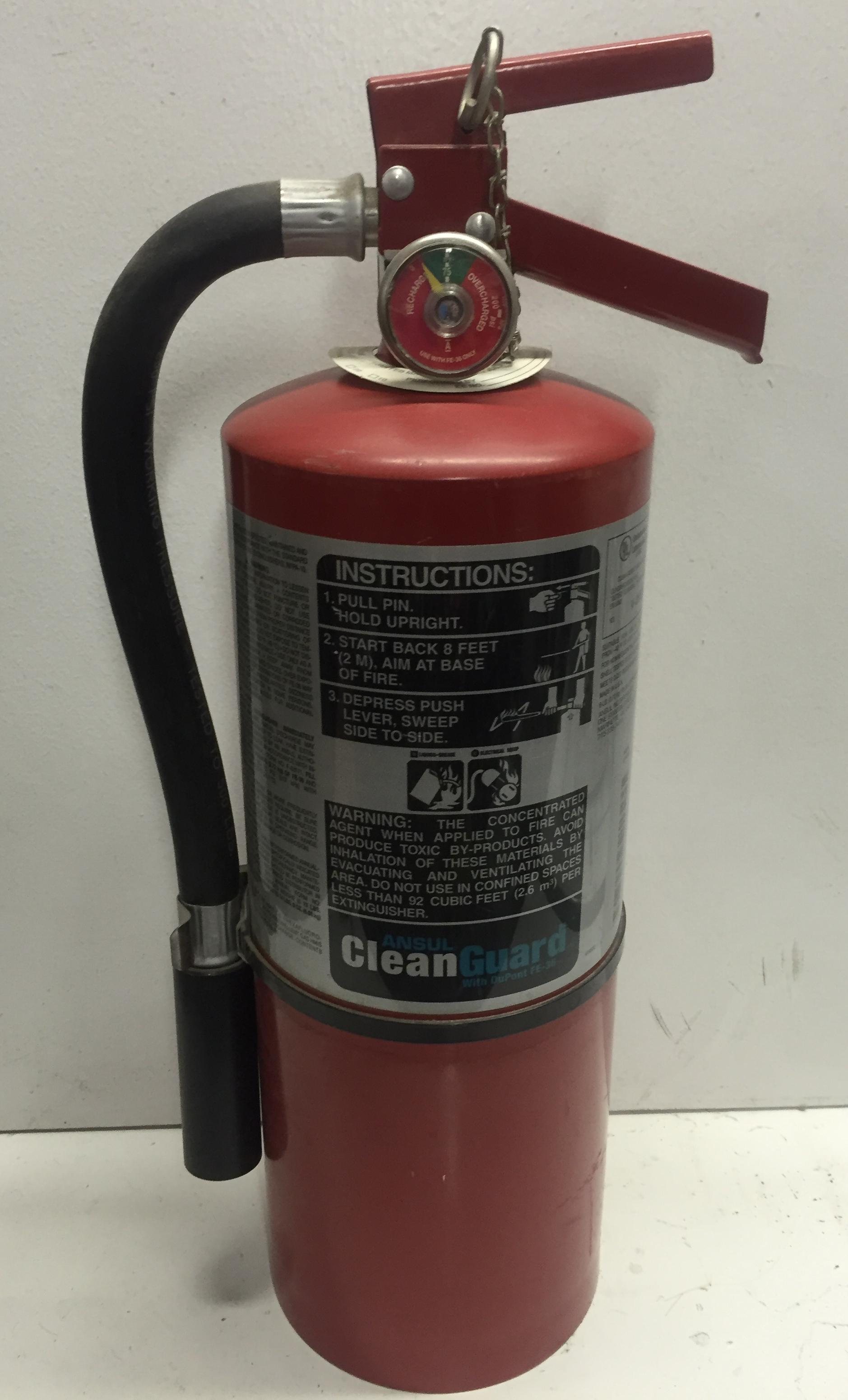
FE-36 Cleanguard fire extinguisher

=== Dry powder and metal fire extinguishers ===
There are several class D fire extinguisher agents available; some will handle multiple types of metals, others will not.

- Sodium chloride (Super-D, Met-L-X, M28, Pyrene Pyromet (Note: "Pyromet" is a trade name that refers to two separate agents. Invented by Pyrene Co. Ltd. (UK) in the 1960s, it was originally a sodium chloride formulation with monoammonium phosphate, protein, clay and waterproofing agents.)) contains sodium chloride salt, which melts to form an oxygen-excluding crust over the metal. A thermoplastic additive such as nylon is added to allow the salt to more readily form a cohesive crust over the burning metal. Useful on most alkali metals including sodium and potassium, and other metals including magnesium, titanium, aluminum, and zirconium. Not to be used for lithium fires as lithium can react with NaCl to form LiCl and Na which will continue burning.
- Copper-based (Copper Powder Navy 125S) developed by the U.S. Navy in the 1970s for hard-to-control lithium and lithium-alloy fires. The powder smothers and acts as a heat sink to dissipate heat, but also forms a copper-lithium alloy on the surface which is non-combustible and cuts off the oxygen supply. Will cling to a vertical surface. Lithium only.
- Graphite-based (G-Plus, G-1, Lith-X, Chubb Pyromet) contains dry graphite that smothers burning metals. The first type developed, designed for magnesium, works on other metals as well. Unlike sodium chloride powder extinguishers, the graphite powder fire extinguishers can be used on very hot burning metal fires such as lithium, but unlike copper powder extinguishers will not stick to and extinguish flowing or vertical lithium fires. Like copper extinguishers, the graphite powder acts as a heat sink as well as smothering the metal fire.
- Sodium carbonate-based (Na-X) is used where stainless steel piping and equipment could be damaged by sodium chloride-based agents to control sodium, potassium, and sodium-potassium alloy fires. Limited use on other metals. Smothers and forms a crust.
- Ternary eutectic chloride (T.E.C.) dry powder is a dry powder invented in 1959 by Lawrence H Cope, a research metallurgist working for the UK Atomic Energy Authority, and licensed to John Kerr Co. of England. It consists of a mixture of three powdered salts: sodium, potassium and barium chloride. T.E.C. forms an oxygen-excluding layer of molten salt on the metal's surface. Along with Met-L-X (sodium chloride), T.E.C has been reported to be one of the most effective agents for use on sodium, potassium, and NaK fires, and is used specifically on atomic metals like uranium and plutonium as it will not contaminate the valuable metal unlike other agents. T.E.C. is quite toxic, due to the barium chloride content, and for this reason is no longer used in the UK, and was never used in the US aside from radioactive material handling glove boxes, where its toxicity was not an issue due their confined nature. T.E.C. is still widely used in India, despite toxicity, while the West uses chiefly sodium chloride, graphite, and copper types of powder and considers T.E.C. obsolete.
- Trimethoxyboroxine (TMB) liquid is a boron compound dissolved in methanol to give it proper fluidity and allow it to be discharged from a portable fire extinguisher. It was developed in the late 1950s by the U.S. Navy for use on magnesium fires, especially crashed aircraft and aircraft wheel fires from hard landings. It is unique as an extinguishing agent in that the agent itself is a flammable liquid. When TMB contacts the fire, the methanol ignites and burns with a greenish flame due to the boron. As the methanol burns off, a glassy coating of boric oxide is left on the surface of the metal, creating an air-excluding crust. These extinguishers were made by the Ansul Chemical Co. utilizing TMB agent manufactured by the Callery Chemical Company, and were modified 2.5-gallon water extinguishers (Ansul used re-branded Elkhart extinguishers at the time), with a variable-stream nozzle that could deliver a straight stream or spray at the squeeze of a lever. A 6-inch fluorescent orange band with the letters "TMB" stenciled in black identified TMB from other extinguishers. This agent was problematic in that it had a shelf life of only six months to a year once the extinguisher was filled, since the methanol is extremely hygroscopic (absorbs moisture from the air), which causes corrosion to the extinguisher and renders its use on fire dangerous. These extinguishers were used from the 1950s–1970s in various applications, such as the MB-1 and MB-5 crash trucks. TMB was used experimentally by the US Air Force, specifically with regard to B-52 engine assemblies, and was tested in modified 10-gallon wheeled chlorobromomethane (CBM) extinguishers. Other agents were added to suppress the methanol flare up, such as CBM, Halon 2402, and Halon 1211, with varied success. Halon 1211 was the most successful, and the combined TMB pressurized with halon 1211 and nitrogen was called Boralon and was used experimentally by the Los Alamos National Laboratory for use on atomic metals, using sealed cylinder extinguishers made by Metalcraft and Graviner which eliminated the moisture contamination problem. TMB/Boralon was abandoned in favor of more versatile agents, though it is still mentioned in most US firefighting literature.
- Buffalo M-X liquid was a short-lived oil-based extinguishing agent for magnesium fires, made by Buffalo in the 1950s. It was discovered by the Germans in World War II that a heavy oil could be applied to burning magnesium chips to cool and smother them, and was easy to apply from a pressurized extinguisher, which was made by the German firm Total. After the war, the technology was more generally disseminated. Buffalo marketed a 2.5 gallon and 1 quart extinguisher using M-X liquid discharged through a low-velocity shower head-type nozzle, but it was met with limited success, as it was going up against Ansul's Met-L-X, which could be used on more types of metals and was non-combustible. M-X had the advantage of being easy to recharge and non-corrosive since it was oil-based, but production did not last long due to its limited applications.
- Some water-based suppressants may be used on certain class D fires, such as burning titanium and magnesium. Examples include the Fire Blockade and FireAde brands of suppressant. Some metals, such as elemental lithium, will react explosively with water so water-based chemicals are not used on such fires.

Most class D extinguishers will have a special low-velocity nozzle or discharge wand to gently apply the agent in large volumes to avoid disrupting any finely divided burning materials. Agents are also available in bulk and can be applied with a scoop or shovel.

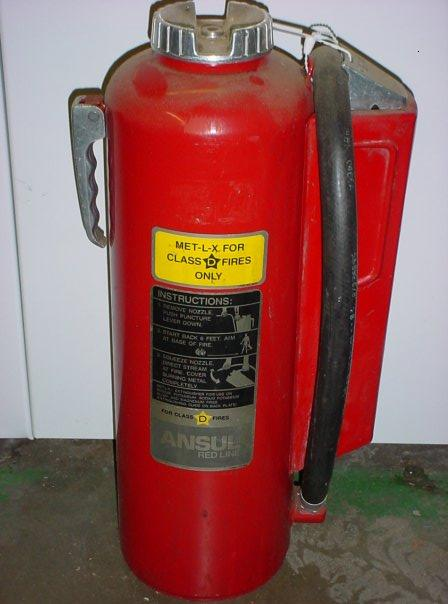
Ansul Met-L-X 30lb. cartridge-operated sodium chloride dry powder

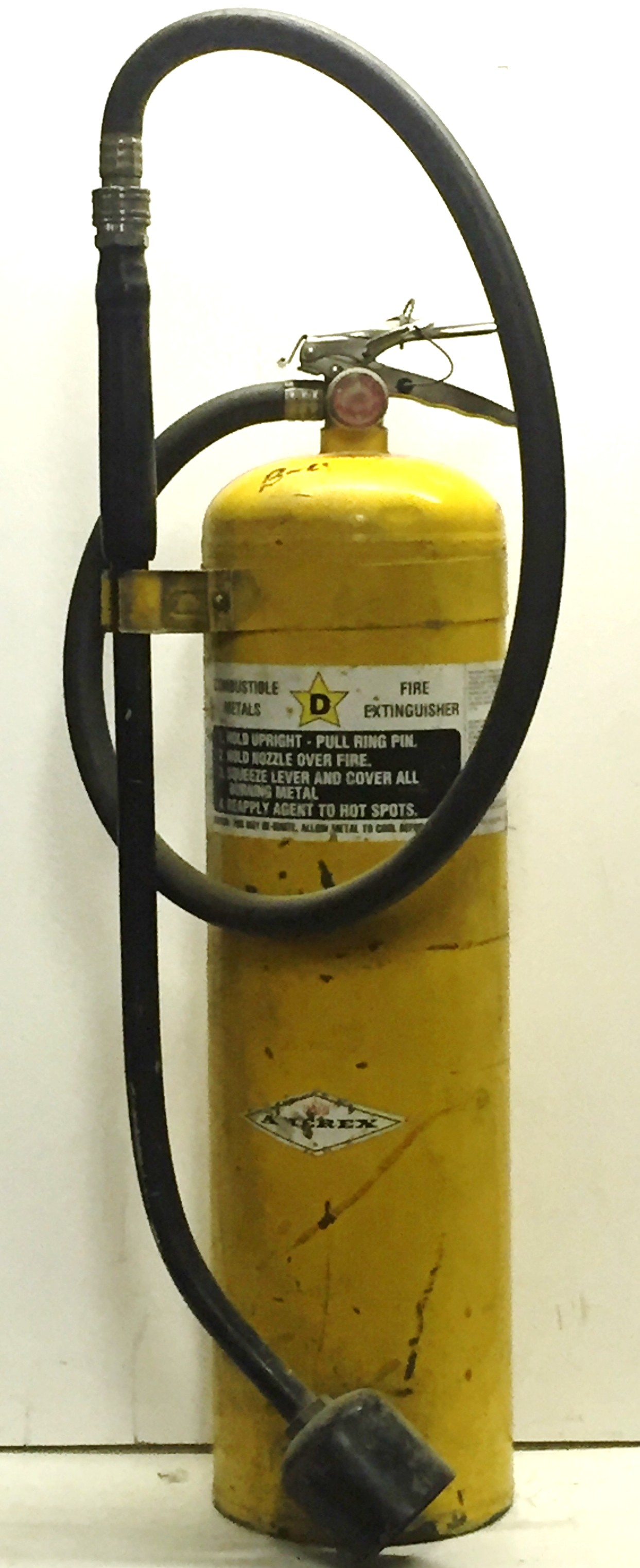
Amerex 30lb. Stored Pressure Sodium Chloride Class D Dry Powder, 1990s, US

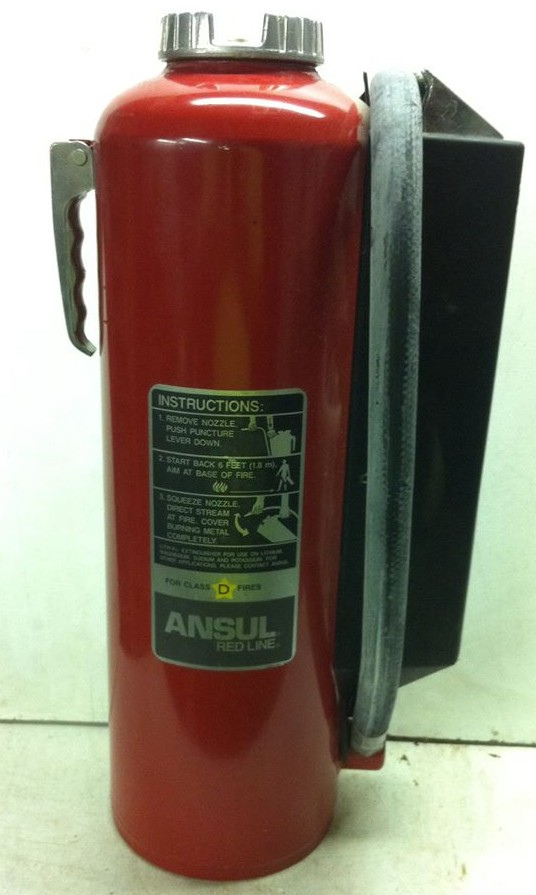
Ansul Lith-X Cartridge-Operated Fire Extinguisher, graphite-base for lithium fires and other alkali metals

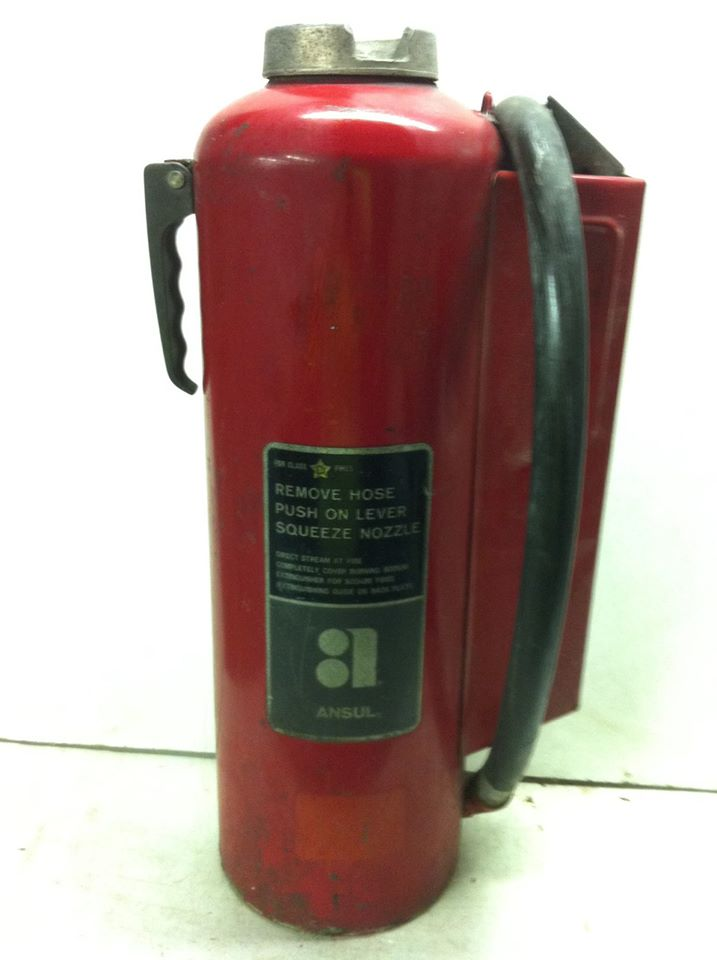
Ansul 30lb. Na-X cartridge-operated sodium carbonate fire extinguisher for sodium fires using non-corrosive agent

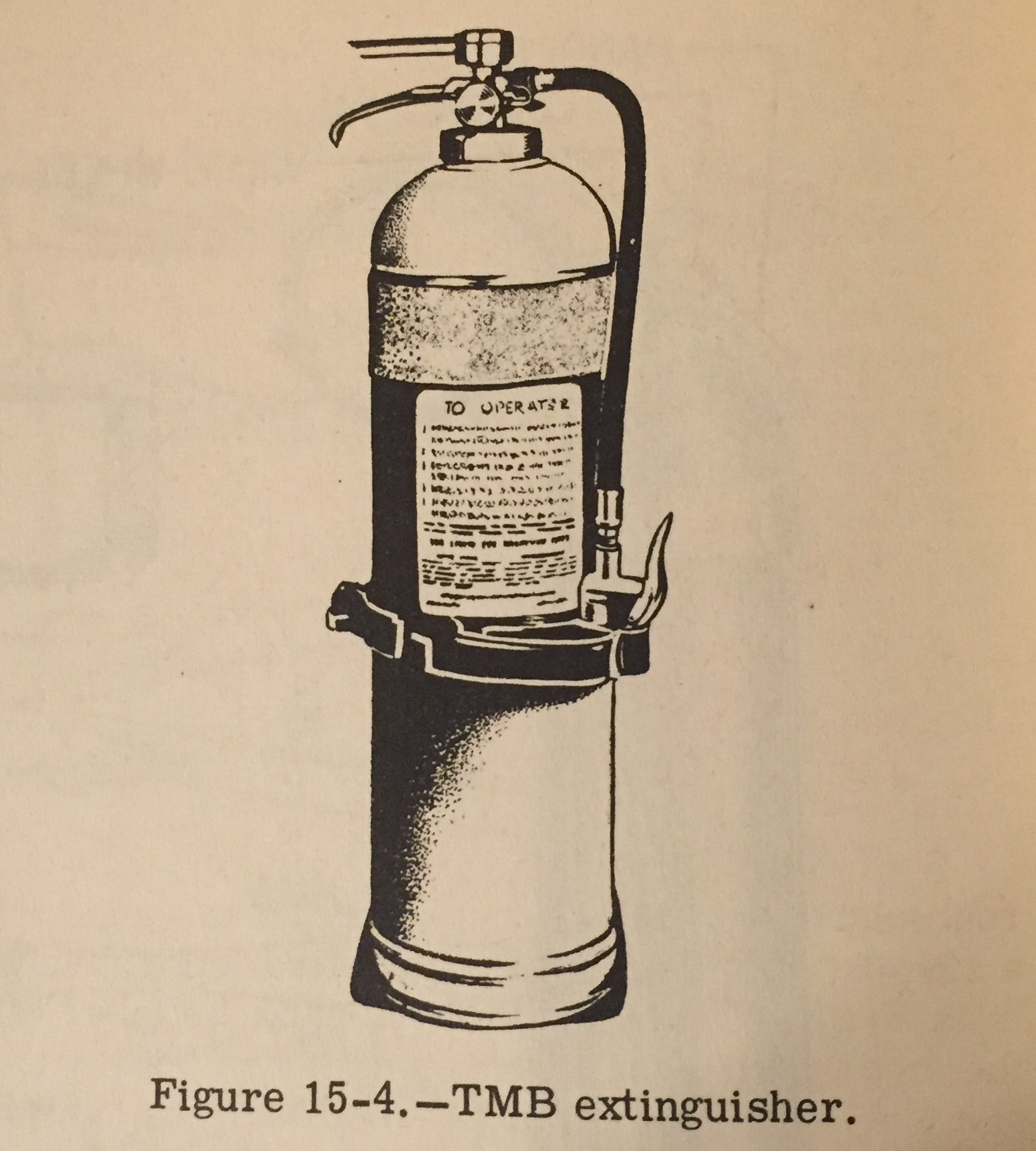
A TMB extinguisher for magnesium fires

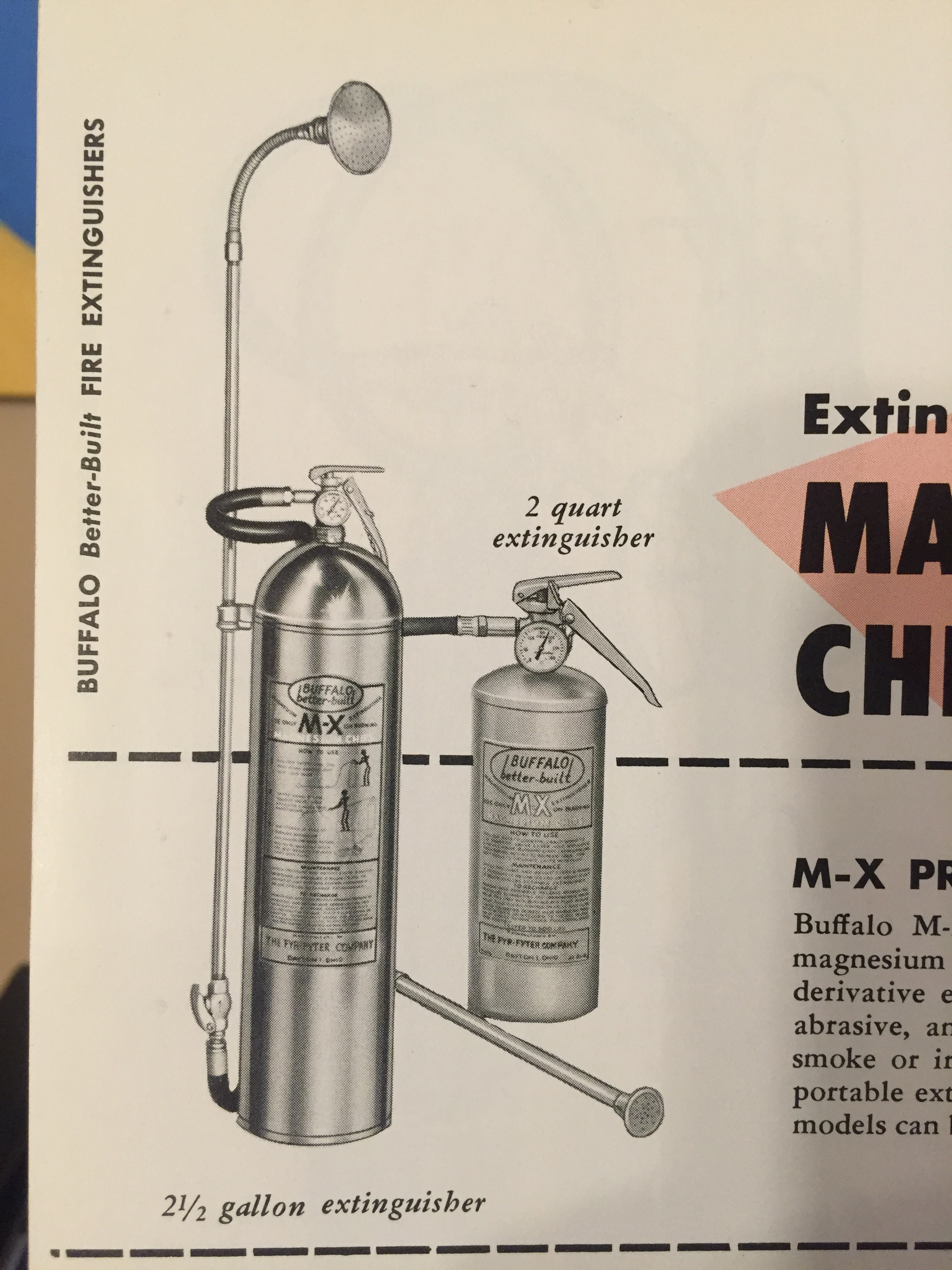
Buffalo fire extinguishers for magnesium fires using M-X liquid

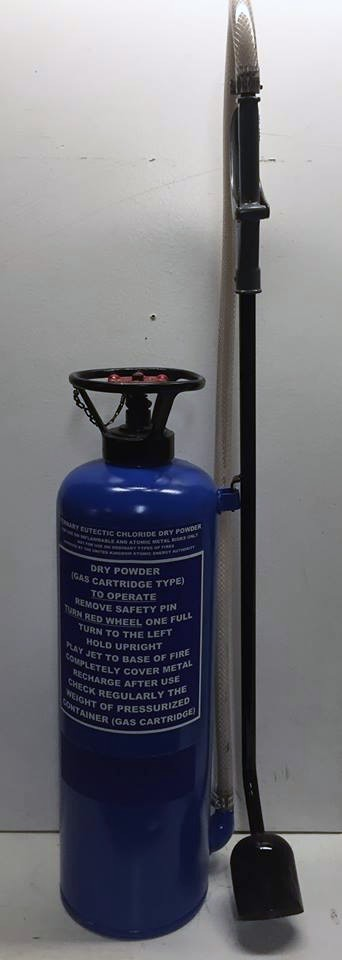
Ternary Eutectic Chloride fire extinguisher for metal fires, UK

=== Fire extinguishing ball ===
Several modern "ball" or grenade-style extinguishers are available on the market. The modern version of the ball is a hard foam shell, wrapped in fuses that lead to a small black powder charge within. The ball bursts shortly after contact with flame, dispersing a cloud of ABC dry chemical powder which extinguishes the fire. The coverage area is about 5 m^{2} (54 sq ft). One benefit of this type is that it may be used for passive suppression. The ball can be placed in a fire-prone area and will deploy automatically if a fire develops, being triggered by heat. They may also be manually operated by rolling or tossing into a fire. Most modern extinguishers of this type are designed to make a loud noise upon deployment.

This technology is not new, however. From about 1880 glass "fire grenades" filled with a weak solution of common salt and ammonium chloride in water were popular. The addition of the salts was to prevent freezing, with ammonium chloride thought to be more effective in extinguishing flame. They were deployed by hurling them at the base of the fire. Containing only about one imperial pint (0.57 L), they were of limited use. Some later brands, such as Red Comet, were designed for passive operation and included a special holder with a spring-loaded trigger that would break the glass ball when a fusible link melted, or were sealed with wax to melt in contact with flame and release the contents. As was typical of this era, some glass extinguishers contained the toxic (but effective) carbon tetrachloride. These glass fire grenade bottles are sought after by collectors.

=== Non-cylindrical designs ===
Fire extinguisher pressure vessels have traditionally used cylindrical geometry. In 2019, Czech company Amplla received EN 3-7 certification for a flat, ring-shaped pressure vessel design. The unit measures approximately 80–90 mm in depth and contains 4–6 kg of ABC dry powder at 15 bar operating pressure.

=== Condensed aerosol fire suppression ===
Condensed aerosol fire suppression is a particle-based form of fire extinction similar to gaseous fire suppression or dry chemical fire extinction. As with gaseous fire suppressants, condensed aerosol suppressants use clean agents to suppress the fire. The agent can be delivered by means of mechanical operation, electric operation, or combined electro-mechanical operation. To the difference of gaseous suppressants, which emit only gas, and dry chemical extinguishers, which release powder-like particles of a large size (25–150 μm) condensed aerosols are defined by the National Fire Protection Association as releasing finely divided solid particles (generally <10 μm), usually in addition to gas.

Whereas dry chemical systems must be directly aimed at the flame, condensed aerosols are flooding agents and therefore effective regardless of the location and height of the fire. Wet chemical systems, such as the kind generally found in foam extinguishers, must, similarly to dry chemical systems, be sprayed directionally, onto the fire. Additionally, wet chemicals (such as potassium carbonate) are dissolved in water, whereas the agents used in condensed aerosols are microscopic solids.

=== Experimental techniques ===
In 2015, researchers from George Mason University announced that high volume sound with low bass frequencies in the 30 to 60 hertz range drives oxygen away from the combustion surface, extinguishing the fire, a principle was previously tested by the Defense Advanced Research Projects Agency (DARPA). One proposed application is to extinguish fires in outer space, with none of the clean-up required for mass-based systems.

Another proposed solution for fire extinguishers in space is a vacuum cleaner that extracts the combustible materials.

== Maintenance ==
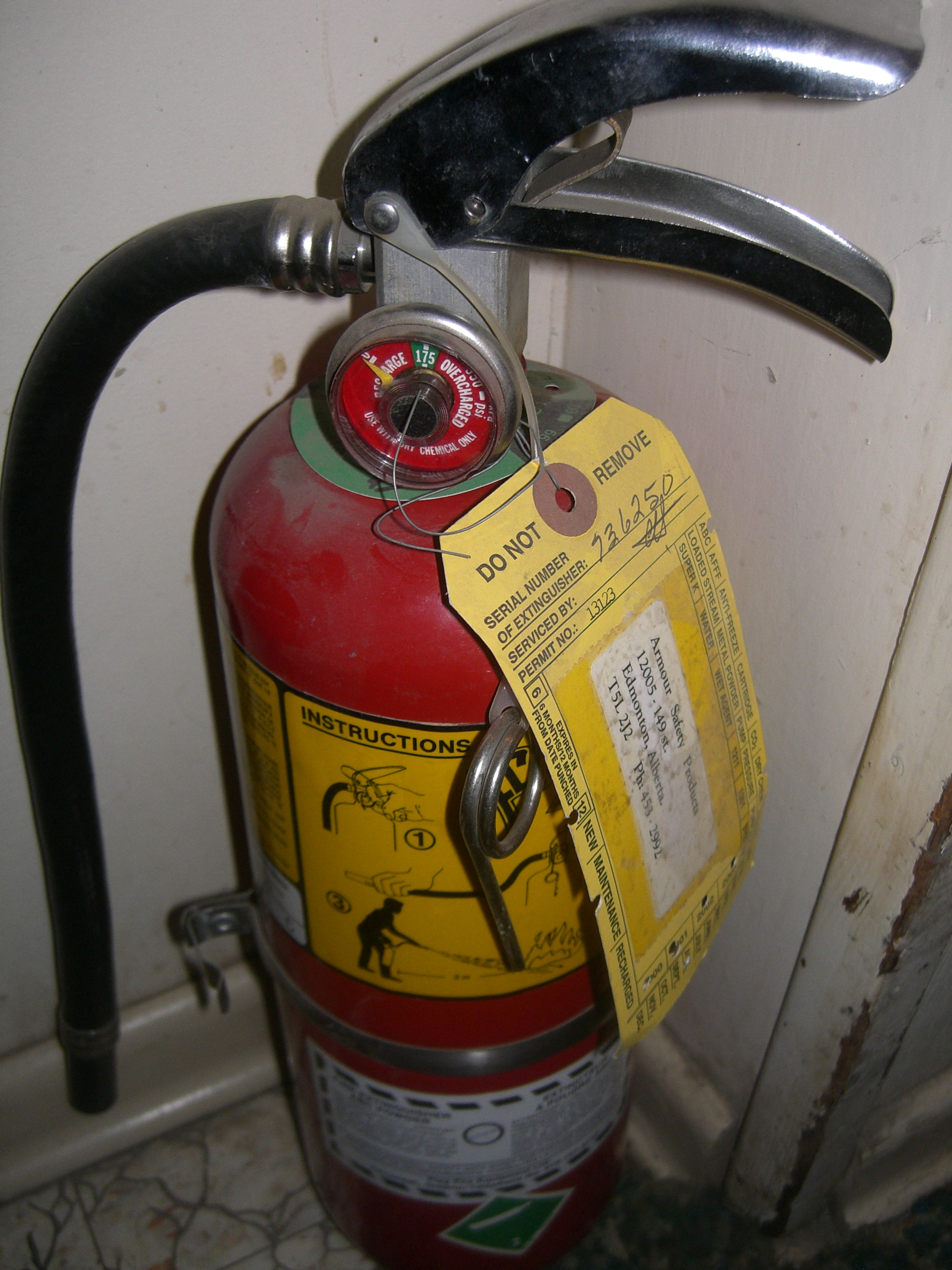
An empty fire extinguisher which was not replaced for years

Most countries in the world require regular fire extinguisher maintenance by a competent person to operate safely and effectively, as part of fire safety legislation. Lack of maintenance can lead to an extinguisher not discharging when required, or rupturing when pressurized. Deaths have occurred, even in recent times, from corroded extinguishers exploding.

In the United States, state and local fire codes, as well as those established by federal agencies such as the Occupational Safety and Health Administration, are generally consistent with standards established by the National Fire Protection Association (NFPA). They commonly require, for fire extinguishers in all buildings other than single-family dwellings, inspections every 30 days to ensure the unit is pressurized and unobstructed (done by an employee of the facility) and an annual inspection and service by a qualified technician. Some jurisdictions require more frequent service. The servicer places a tag on the extinguisher to indicate the type of service performed (annual inspection, recharge, new fire extinguisher). Hydrostatic pressure testing for all types of extinguishers is also required, generally every five years for water and CO_{2} models up to every 12 years for dry chemical models.

Recently the NFPA and ICC voted to allow for the elimination of the 30-day inspection requirement so long as the fire extinguisher is monitored electronically. According to NFPA, the system must provide record keeping in the form of an electronic event log at the control panel. The system must also constantly monitor an extinguisher's physical presence, internal pressure and whether an obstruction exists that could prevent ready access. In the event that any of the above conditions are found, the system must send an alert to officials so they can immediately rectify the situation. Electronic monitoring can be wired or wireless.

In the UK, three types of maintenance are required:

- Basic service: All types of extinguisher require a basic inspection annually to check weight, externally validate the correct pressure, and find any signs of damage or corrosion. Cartridge extinguishers are to be opened up for internal inspection, and to have the weight of the cartridge tested. Labels must be inspected for legibility, and where possible, dip tubes, hoses and mechanisms must be tested for clear, free operation.
- Extended service: Water, wet chemical, foam, and powder extinguishers require a more detailed examination every five years, including a test discharge and recharge. On stored pressure extinguishers, this is the only opportunity to internally inspect for damage/corrosion.
- Overhaul: CO_{2} extinguishers, due to their high operating pressure, are subject to pressure vessel safety legislation, and must be hydraulic pressure tested, inspected internally and externally, and date stamped every 10 years. As it cannot be pressure tested, a new valve is also fitted. If any part of the extinguisher is replaced with a part from another manufacturer, then the extinguisher will lose its fire rating.

In the United States, there are three types of service:

- Maintenance inspection
- Internal maintenance:
  - Water – annually (some states) or 5 years (NFPA 10, 2010 edition)
  - Foam – every 3 years
  - Wet chemical, and CO_{2} – every 5 years
  - Dry chemical and dry powder – every 6 years
  - Halon and clean agents – every 6 years.
  - Cartridge-operated dry chemical or dry powder – annually
  - Stored-pressure dry chemical mounted on vehicles – annually
- Hydrostatic testing

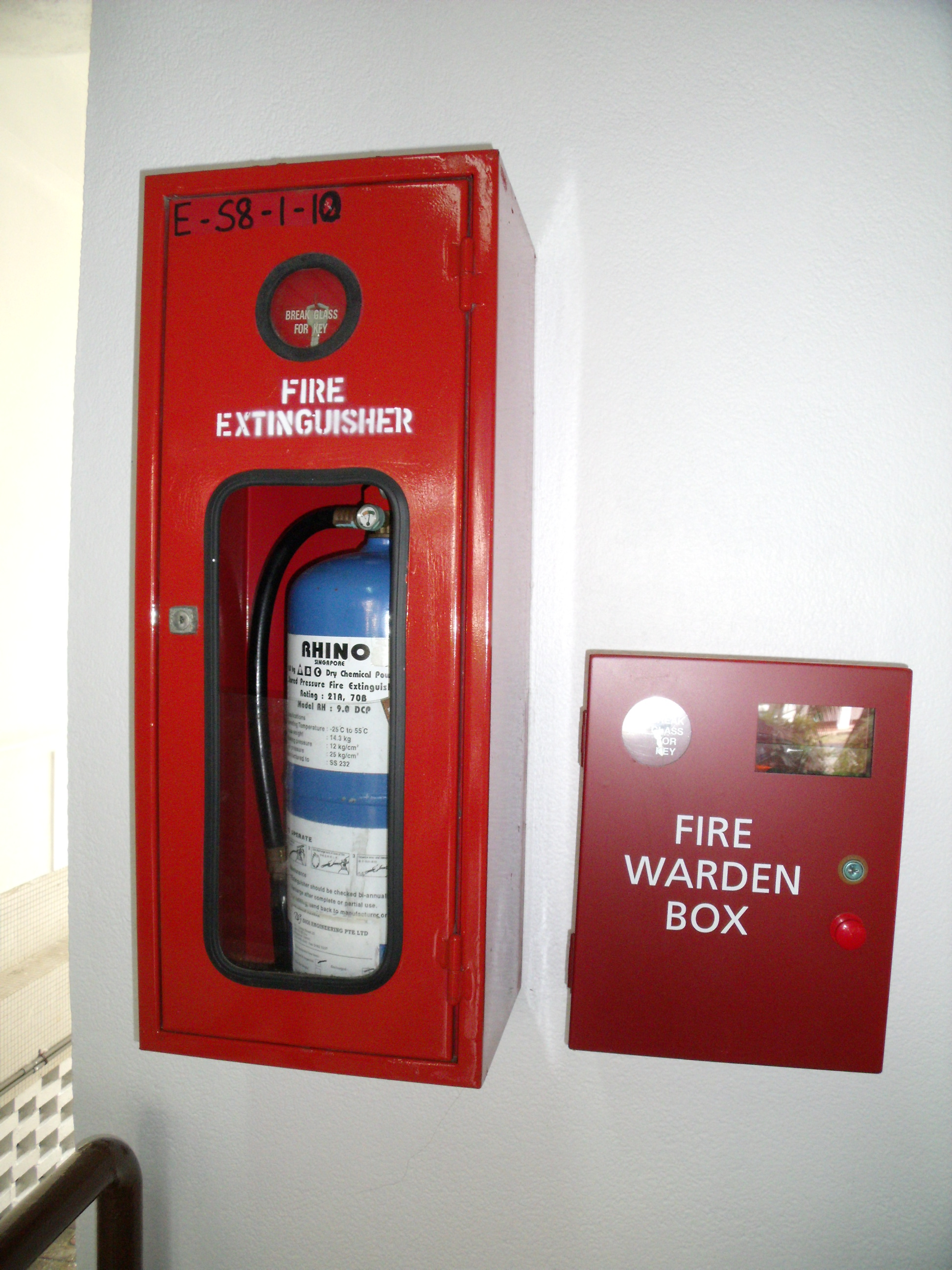
A fire extinguisher stored inside a cabinet mounted to a wall

In open public spaces, extinguishers are ideally kept inside cabinets that have glass that must be broken to access the extinguisher, or which emit an alarm siren that cannot be shut off without a key, to alert people the extinguisher has been handled by an unauthorized person if a fire is not present. This also alerts maintenance to check an extinguisher for usage so that it may be replaced if it has been used.

== See also ==
- Fire blanket
- K-factor (fire protection)
