= Equipment of the Royal Netherlands Air Force =

This page lists the equipment of the Royal Netherlands Air and Space Force.

== Detailed list of aircraft ==
=== Detailed list of aeroplanes ===
Model	Variant	Image	Origin	Type	Quantity	Notes
Combat aircraft
Lockheed Martin F-35 Lightning II	F-35A		United States	Swing role stealth fighter	44 (+6)	Successor of the F-16AM.: 37 approved in 2013; 15 ordered in 2018; 6 ordered in 2022; Deliveries: first in October 2019. Note: 8 are used as trainers, and are in the trainer section.
Transport
Lockheed Martin C-130 Hercules	C-130H		United States	Tactical transport aircraft	2	2 C-130H30 ordered in 1993, 2 C-130H ordered in 2004. To be replaced by the Embraer C-390.
Lockheed Martin C-130 Hercules	C-130H30		United States	Tactical transport aircraft	2	2 C-130H30 ordered in 1993, 2 C-130H ordered in 2004. To be replaced by the Embraer C-390.
Embraer C-390 Millenium	—		Brazil	Tactical transport aircraft	0 (+5 on order)	The deliveries to start in 2027. Rheinmetall to provide the simulators.
Gulfstream G650	G650ER		United States	VIP transport	1	
Trainers
Lockheed Martin F-35 Lightning II	F-35A		United States	Conversion trainer	8	Operated in the US for the training of the pilots.
Pilatus PC-7 Turbo Trainer	PC-7		Switzerland	Basic training aircraft	13	In service since 1989. To be replaced with the PC-7 MKX.
Pilatus PC-7 Turbo Trainer	PC-7 MKX		Switzerland	Basic training aircraft	0 (+8 on order)	Selected in October 2024, purchased with 4 flight simulators in February 2025.

=== Co-owned aeroplanes ===
Model	Variant	Operators	Image	Origin	Type	Quantity	Notes
Aerial refueling
Airbus A330 MRTT; Multi-Role Tanker Transport	A330-200 MRTT	MMF; Multinational MRTT Fleet Belgium; Czech Republic; Denmark; Finland; Germany; Luxembourg; Netherlands; Norway; Sweden		European Union	Tanker / transport aircraft	10 (+ 2 on order)	Based at the Eindhoven Air Base in the Netherlands. History of the programme (nations joining and aircraft orders): July 2016, multinational fleet created by the Netherlands and Luxembourg, 2 aircraft ordered.; September 2017, Germany and Norway join the fleet, 5 aircraft ordered.; February 2018, Belgium joins the fleet, 1 aircraft ordered.; September 2020, 1 aircraft ordered, Luxembourg expands its participation.; March 2023, 1 aircraft ordered, Belgium expands its participation.; June 2025, Denmark and Sweden join the fleet, 2 aircraft ordered.; July 2026, Finland joins the fleet.; The first aircraft entered service in June 2020, the ninth in February 2025).
Transport
Boeing C-17 Globemaster III	C-17A	SAC; Strategic Airlift Capability Bulgaria; Estonia; Finland; Hungary; Lithuania; Netherlands; Norway; Poland; Romania; Slovenia; Sweden; United States		United States	Strategic transport aircraft	3	Based at Pápa Air Base in Hungary.
Air surveillance
Boeing E-3 Sentry	E-3A	NAEW&CF programme NATO Airborne Early Warning & Control Force Belgium; Canada; Czech Republic; Denmark; Germany; Greece; Hungary; Italy; Luxembourg; Netherlands; Norway; Poland; Portugal; Romania; Turkey; Spain; United States		United States	AEW&C; Airborne early warning and control	14	Based at NATO Air Base Geilenkirchen, Germany. 18 E-3 used initially, and to be replaced by the E-7 Wedgetail, of which 6 ordered in January 2024.

=== Detailed list of helicopters ===
Model	Variant	Image	Origin	Type	Quantity	Notes
Combat helicopter
Boeing AH-64 Apache	AH-64E		United States	Attack helicopter	20 (+8 on order)	The Netherlands purchased 30 AH-64D, and received the first in 1998. It was modernised to the standard AH-64D Block III in 2012. 2 AH-64D were lost.(1 in Afghanistan in 2004, 1 in Mali in 2015). 28 of the AH-64D rebuilt to the standard AH-64E, contract in 2018, first delivered in 2022.
Transport helicopters
CH-47 Chinook	CH-47F MYII CAAS		United States	Heavy lift helicopter	20	CH-47 history in RNLASF: 13 CH-47D purchased in 1995. 2 of these lost in 2005, taken out of service between 2015 and 2023.; 6 CH-47F received between 2009 and 2013, and modernised to the latest standard (MYII CAAS).; 14 CH-47F MYII CAAS delivered between 2015 and 2023.
AS-532 Cougar	AS-532U2		France	Multirole helicopter	12	17 ordered in 1993, received between 1996 and 1998. Their replacement is starting in 2028 with the purchase of 12 H225M Caracal.
NHIndustries NH90	NH90 NFH		France; Germany; Italy; Netherlands	Naval helicopter (including ASW)	19 (+3 ordered)	Contract for 20 helicopters signed in June 2000, first delivered in April 2010. 1 lost in July 2020. MLU scheduled in 2027. A need for additional NH90 NFH identified by the review of the defence capabilities. 3 were ordered in December 2025.
Special role helicopter
Airbus Helicopters H225M	—		France	Special operations helicopter	0 (+12 on order)	The H225M was selected in June 2023, with 14 expected to be ordered. Order of 12 helicopter in November 2024.

=== List of unmanned aerial vehicles ===
Model	Variant	Image	Origin	Type	Role	Quantity	Notes
General Atomics MQ-9 Reaper	MQ-9A Block 5		United States	MALE, fixed-wing UCAV; Medium-altitude long-endurance	Surveillance and reconnaissance	4 (+4 on order)	Four drones delivered in 2022. Four additional on order. At the moment unarmed, planned to be armed soon.

=== List of satellites ===
Model	Variant	Image	Origin	Type	Role	Quantity	Notes
ICEYE SAR	25 cm resolution imaging		Finland	Microsatellite, synthetic-aperture imaging radar	Imaging surveillance satellite	1 (+ 3 on order)	First satellite put in orbit in June 2025.

== Aircraft equipment ==
=== Aeroplanes equipment ===
==== Weapons for aeroplanes ====
Model	Variant	Image	Origin	Type	Used with	Quantity	Notes
Air-to-air missiles
AIM-9 Sidewinder	AIM-9M		United States	Infrared homing, short range air-to-air missile	F-35A Lightning II	0 (retired)	290 purchase in 1990. Variant likely donated to Ukraine.
AIM-9 Sidewinder	AIM-9X Block II		United States	Infrared homing, short range air-to-air missile	F-35A Lightning II	409	68 purchased in 2014; 95 approved for sale in May 2022; 246 approved for sale in September 2024
AIM-9 Sidewinder	AIM-9X Block II+		United States	Infrared homing, short range air-to-air missile	F-35A Lightning II	43	43 approved for sale in May 2022
AIM-120 AMRAAM Advanced Medium-Range Air-to-Air Missile	AIM-120A		United States	BVR air-to-air missile Beyond visual range	F-35A Lightning II	0 (retired)	200 purchased in 1995. Variant likely donated to Ukraine.
AIM-120 AMRAAM Advanced Medium-Range Air-to-Air Missile	AIM-120 C7		United States	BVR air-to-air missile Beyond visual range	F-35A Lightning II	68	26 ordered in 2017; 42 ordered in 2019
AIM-120 AMRAAM Advanced Medium-Range Air-to-Air Missile	AIM-120 C8		United States	BVR air-to-air missile Beyond visual range	F-35A Lightning II	0 (232 potentially)	Approved for sale in 2025.
AIM-120 AMRAAM Advanced Medium-Range Air-to-Air Missile	AIM-120D3		United States	BVR air-to-air missile Beyond visual range	F-35A Lightning II	226	Missiles supplied by Raytheon, approved for sale in December 2024, order in July 2025.
Strategic weapons
B61 nuclear bomb	B61 Mod 12		United States	Thermonuclear gravity bomb	F-35A Lightning II	22	Weapons under American control, operated by the RNAF.
Air-to-ground missiles
AGM-158 JASSM; Joint Air-to-Surface Standoff Missile	AGM-158B JASSM - ER; JASSM -Extended Range		United States	Land attack cruise missile (externally mounted)	F-35A Lightning II	0 (+120 on order)	Contract signed with Lockheed Martin in July 2024.
AGM-88 HARM; High-speed Anti-Radiation Missile	AGM-88G AARGM - ER; Advanced Anti-Radiation Guided Missile - Extended Range		United States	Anti-radiation missile	F-35A Lightning II	0 (+265 on order)	Ordered from Orbital ATK.
Guided bombs
GBU-39 SDB; Small Diameter Bomb	GBU-39B SDB I		United States	Guided bomb 250 lb (110 kg)	F-35A Lightning II	853	Used with the former F-16, and used now with the F-35A. Mounted on a quad-bomb launcher rail for the bomb-bay.: 603 approved for purchase in 2010, and purchase the same year.; 250 approved for purchase in 2017.
Unguided bombs
Mark 82	—		United States	Gravity bomb 500 lb (230 kg)	F-35A Lightning II	Unknown	Used with GBU-10 Paveway II, GBU-12 Paveway II, GBU-38 JDAM and GBU-49 Enhanced Paveway II.
Mark 84	—		United States	Gravity bomb 2,000 lb (910 kg)	F-35A Lightning II	Unknown	Used with GBU-31 V1 JDAM.
BLU-109	—		United States	Bunker buster bomb 2,000 lb (910 kg)	F-35A Lightning II	Unknown	Used with GBU-31 V3 JDAM.
Bomb guidance kits
GBU-10 Paveway II	—		United States	Laser guidance kit	F-35A Lightning II	Unknown	Warhead, Mark 82, 500 lb (230 kg) bomb. Initially purchased for the F-16, but compatible with the F-35A.
GBU-12 Paveway II	—		United States	Laser guidance kit	F-35A Lightning II	Unknown	Warhead, Mark 82, 500 lb (230 kg) bomb. Initially purchased for the F-16, but compatible with the F-35A.
GBU-38 JDAM	—		United States	GPS guidance kit	F-35A Lightning II	Unknown	Warhead, Mark 82, 500 lb (230 kg) bomb. Initially purchased for the F-16, but compatible with the F-35A.
GBU-49 - Enhanced Paveway II	—		United States	Precision guidance kit Dual mode GPS / laser	F-35A Lightning II	200	Warhead, Mark 82, 500 lb (230 kg) bomb.: 200 bombs ordered from Raytheon in 2008.; Initially purchased for the F-16, but compatible with the F-35A.
GBU-31 V1 JDAM	GBU-31 V1		United States	GPS guidance kit	F-35A Lightning II	Unknown	Warhead, Mark 84, 2,000 lb (910 kg) bomb. Initially purchased for the F-16, but compatible with the F-35A.
GBU-31 V3 JDAM	GBU-31 V3		United States	GPS guidance kit	F-35A Lightning II	Unknown	Warhead, BLU-109, 2,000 lb (910 kg) bomb. Initially purchased for the F-16, but compatible with the F-35A.
Cannons
GAU-22 (4 barrels variant of the GAU-12 Equalizer)	GAU-22/A		United States	Rotary cannon, 25×137 mm	F-35A Lightning II	46	1 gun per F-35A in service.

==== Equipment for aeroplanes ====
Model	Image	Origin	Type	Used with	Quantity	Notes
Knight Aerospace - Advanced aeromedical evacuation system		United States; Brazil; Netherlands	MEDEVAC, roll-on / roll-off modular system Medical evacuation	Embraer C-390 Millenium	5	Ordered in June 2025 with Austria (who ordered 4 systems).

=== Helicopters equipment ===
Model	Variant	Image	Origin	Type	Used with	Quantity	Notes
Tactical / short range missiles
AGM-114 Hellfire II	AGM-114K		United States	Air-to-ground missile	AH-64E Apache	605	Up to 16 missiles, 4 mounts with a 4 missiles launcher system. 605 missiles ordered in 1995 (USD $127 million).
AGM-114 Hellfire II	AGM-114R		United States	Air-to-ground missile	AH-64E Apache	350	100 ordered in 2013.; 250 ordered in 2017 for the Netherlands.; This followed the request for 180 missiles by the Netherlands in 2013. An additional request for 70 missiles was approved in 2017.
AGM-114 Hellfire II	AGM-114R2		United States	Air-to-ground missile	AH-64E Apache	386	Order in February 2024.
AGM-179 JAGM; Joint Air-to-Ground Missile	AGM-179A		United States	Air-to-surface missile	AH-64E Apache	296	Ordered in June 2025.
Rockets
Hydra 70	—		United States	Unguided rockers	AH-64E Apache	Unknown	Up to 76 (4×19) ready-to-fire rockets, 4 × M261 launchers, one under each mount.
AGR-20 APKWS; Advanced Precision Kill Weapon System	WGU-59 APKWS-2		United States	Laser guidance kit for unguided rockers	AH-64E Apache	1,100	1,000 ordered in 2016; 100 ordered in December 2019
Canons
M230 Chain Gun	—		United States	Electrically driven autocannon	AH-64E Apache	28	The Apache is equipped with 1,200 ready-to-fire rounds of the 30×113mm calibre.
Small arms
FN M3M / GAU-21	—		Belgium	Door machine gun, 12.7×99mm NATO	CH-47F Chinook NH90 NFH	Unknown	CH-47F: 1 on each side, and one on the rear ramp; NH-90: 1 on each side possible
FN MAG	—		Belgium	Door machine gun, 7.62×51mm NATO	AS532 U2 Cougar CH-47F Chinook NH90 NFH	Unknown	Cougar: 1 on the door side; CH-47F: 1 on each side, and one on the rear ramp; NH-90: 1 on each side possible
Torpedoes
Mark 46	Mk 46 Mod 5		United States	Antisubmarine lightweight torpedo	NH90 NFH	Unknown	Up to 2 torpedoes can be mounted on the NH90 NFH. This torpedo is planned to be replaced at the end of the 2020s, and will replace it with the Mark 54.
Mark 54	—		United States	Antisubmarine lightweight torpedo	NH90 NFH	0	Mark 54 torpedo will enter service on the NH90 after its MLU between 2028 and 2032.

== Radars ==
Model	Image	Origin	Type	Quantity	Notes
Radar
Thales GM400α		France	Mobile long-range radar system	1	Temporary solution (reserve unit) until both of the SMART-L radar stations are operational.
Thales SMART-L		Netherlands	Ground radar station	1	1 operational (North), second planned (South)

== Vehicles ==
Model	Image	Origin	Type	Quantity	Notes
Armoured vehicle
Iveco Manticore		Italy; Netherlands	Infantry mobility vehicle, MRAP; Mine-resistant ambush protected	94	94 in total for the Air Force: 26 AFSV (Air Force Security Vehicle); HT (Hardtop); PU (Pick-up); CAST (Casualty transport)
Utility vehicles
Volkswagen Amarok		Germany	Dog transport / Security personnel transport	8	Used at the Gilze-Rijen, Leeuwarden and Volkel air bases.
Logistics
Scania XT "Gryphus"; 4×4 Low Operational 50 kN (5 tons)		Sweden	Truck	123	
Scania XT "Gryphus"; 6×6 Low Operational 100 kN (10 tons)		Sweden	Truck	123	
Scania XT "Gryphus"; 8×8 High Operational 100 kN (10 tons)		Sweden	Truck	123	
Scania XT "Gryphus"; 6×6 Low Operational 150 kN (15 tons)		Sweden	Truck	68	26 of these vehicles can be used for deicing the runways and taxiways.
Firefighting trucks
E-One Titan 8×8		United States	Airport crash tender	25	
Rosenbauer Panther 6×6		Austria; Germany	Airport crash tender	0 (+ 23 on order)	26 ordered in February 2026, 23 for the air force.
Rosenbauer - Mercedes-Benz Atego 1529	—	Austria; Germany	Fire engine	—	
Rosenbauer - Mercedes Actros 2965 6×6		Austria; Germany	Fire engine	5	Intended to be used to protect FARP (Forward Arming and Refueling Point).
Rosenbauer - Scania P450B 6×6 HZ	—	Austria; Sweden	Fire engine	—	Intended to be used to protect FARP (Forward Arming and Refueling Point).
Rosenbauer RT		Austria; Netherlands	Fire engine	2	Volvo Penta electric driveline
Fire command vehicles
Nissan Navara (D40)		Japan	On scene command vehicle	2	
Škoda Yeti		Czech Republic	Command vehicle	10	2 of the 10 used by the Navy
Fuel trucks
Volvo FM		Sweden	Aircraft refueling truck	Unknown	30 m^{3} capacity
Mercedes-Benz Actros 4×4		Austria; Germany	Aircraft refueling truck	Unknown	4 m^{3} capacity
Maintenance vehicles
Valtra G135		Finland	Tractor	13	To be used for airfield maintenance

== Small arms ==
Model	Image	Origin	Type	Calibre	Notes
Handguns
Glock 17 Gen4		Austria	Semi-automatic pistol	9×19mm Parabellum	
Assault rifles, carabines and battle rifles
Canadian Diemaco C7A1		Canada	Assault rifle	5.56×45mm NATO	It can be equipped with: Aimpoint CompM4 red dot; Aimpoint 3 × magnifying scope; Rheinmetall 's Laser Module Double Beam
Canadian Diemaco C8A1		Canada	Carbine	5.56×45mm NATO	It can be equipped with: Aimpoint CompM4 red dot; Aimpoint 3 × magnifying scope; Rheinmetall 's Laser Module Double Beam
Heckler & Koch 416 A5		Germany	Carbine	5.56×45mm NATO	Equipped with, red dot sight 4.3× Elcan, laser light modules LLM01
Precision rifles
Heckler & Koch HK417		Germany	Designated marksman rifle	7.62×51mm NATO	Accessories: Schmidt & Bender 3-12×50 telescopic sight; Aimpoint comp M2 red-dot with a 3× magnifier
Machine guns
FN Minimi Para		Belgium	Light machine gun	5.56×45mm NATO	Standard infantry machine gun.
FN MAG		Belgium	General-purpose machine gun	7.62×51mm NATO	Mounted on vehicles and shooting positions.
Grenade launchers
Heckler & Koch UGL		Germany	Under-barrel grenade launcher	40×46mm LV	Grenade launchers for the HK416 A5 and the Colt C7A1.
Anti-tank weapons
Panzerfaust 3		Germany	RPG Rocket-propelled grenade	110mm	Standard Marine infantry AT weapon. Ammunitions: DM12A2 (HEAT-RA, "High Explosive Anti Tank – Rocket Assisted"); DM72 (HEAT-IT-RA, "High Explosive Anti Tank - Improved Tandem - Rocket Assisted"); DM32 (HEAT-MP-RA, "High Explosive Anti Tank - Multi Purpose - Rocket Assisted"); DM18A1 (TP-RA, "Training Practice - Rocket Assisted"); Accessories: Dynarange firing system
Weapon stations
FN deFNder		Belgium	Remote controlled weapon station	7.62×51mm NATO	Installed on the Iveco MTV hard-top, equipped with the FN MAG.
