= Fast Flow Extinguishers =

Commonly referred to as "Fast Flow" or "High Performance" extinguishers. Available in 6 kg (13 lb), 9 kg (20 lb), and 14 kg (30 lb). capacities and contain ABC Dry Chemical, Purple-K, or sodium bicarbonate. They are currently manufactured by Ansul in cartridge-operated form, along with Amerex, Badger, and Buckeye stored pressure design.

== UL rating differences for "Fast Flow" ==
These extinguishers have a higher dry chemical flow rate then conventional extinguishers. In other words, a fast flow extinguisher expels a higher volume of agent in less time than a standard compliance flow extinguisher. As a result, fast flow extinguishers have lower UL class A&B ratings than compliance flow extinguishers (the class B numerical rating is the approximate square feet of burning fuel a novice operator could expect to extinguish). UL Class B tests are conducted on fuel in depth fires in what is known as a burn pan. Burn pans come in various sizes (square feet) in relation to what UL rating an extinguisher will receive for successfully extinguishing it. The larger the burn pan fire, the larger the rating and the longer the extinguisher must discharge to be able to handle the larger volume of fire before running out. For a given size extinguisher the resulting effect is a lower flow rate, resulting in a higher UL rating.

Generally for same size extinguishers (agent capacity)

- High UL rating = Low flow rate
- Low UL rating = High flow rate

=== Examples ===
- A 20 lb (9.1 kg). ABC Compliance flow has a UL rating of 20A, 120 BC.
- A 20 lb (9.1 kg). ABC Fast Flow has a UL rating of 4A, 60 BC.

== Fast Flows and the NFPA ==
In the revised NFPA 10 section "5-5 "Application for Specific Hazards" requires "fast flow" extinguishers in locations containing pressurized flammable liquids and pressurized flammable gas and areas with three-dimensional class B hazards. Pressurized gas and three-dimensional fires require higher flow rates then standard extinguishers in order to be extinguished. The higher flow rate puts more agent onto the fire quicker and results in a faster "knock-down" of the fire. Higher flow rates also provide more operator protection by putting a "heavier" stream of dry chemical in between the operator and fire. This creates a temporary "heat shield" as long as the agent is being discharged because of the light color of the agent it reflects most of the radiant heat back away from the operator.

== See also ==
- Fire extinguisher
- Fire protection
- Condensed aerosol fire suppression
