= J. R. McWane =

American industrialist

- Born: James Ransom McWane; August 15, 1869; Wytheville, Virginia, United States
- Died: June 24, 1933 (aged 63); Chicago, Illinois, United States
- Education: Bethany College (AB)
- Occupation: Businessman
- Known for: McWane, Inc. Vulcan statue

James Ransom McWane (August 15, 1869 – June 24, 1933) was an American industrialist and founder of McWane, Inc., which was based in Birmingham, Alabama. Today, it is one of the world’s largest manufacturers of cast iron pipes.

McWane was born in Virginia, where his father operated a foundry business. An 1891 graduate of Bethany College, he was recruited by the Birmingham Steel and Iron Company and moved to Alabama in 1903. The following year, he oversaw the construction of Vulcan, the largest cast iron statue in the world, for the 1904 World's Fair in St. Louis, Missouri. In 1908, McWane joined John Eagan's ACIPCO as a senior executive. He became the firm's president in 1915, and was responsible for much of its modernization and expansion until he was forced out by Eagan in 1921. Afterwards, McWane opened his own pipe foundry in Birmingham. It was the Roaring Twenties, and it quickly became successful, adding a second facility in Utah in 1926. McWane moved to a stately home in Mountain Brook in 1929. He also became a trustee of Lynchburg College in Virginia. While on business in Chicago, he died from a heart attack in 1933.
