= John J. Eagan =

John J. Eagan may refer to:

- John J. Eagan (politician), member of the U.S. House of Representatives from New Jersey
- John J. Eagan (industrialist), American industrialist and co-founder of the American Cast Iron Pipe Company
