= Rosenbauer Simba =

Airport crash tender

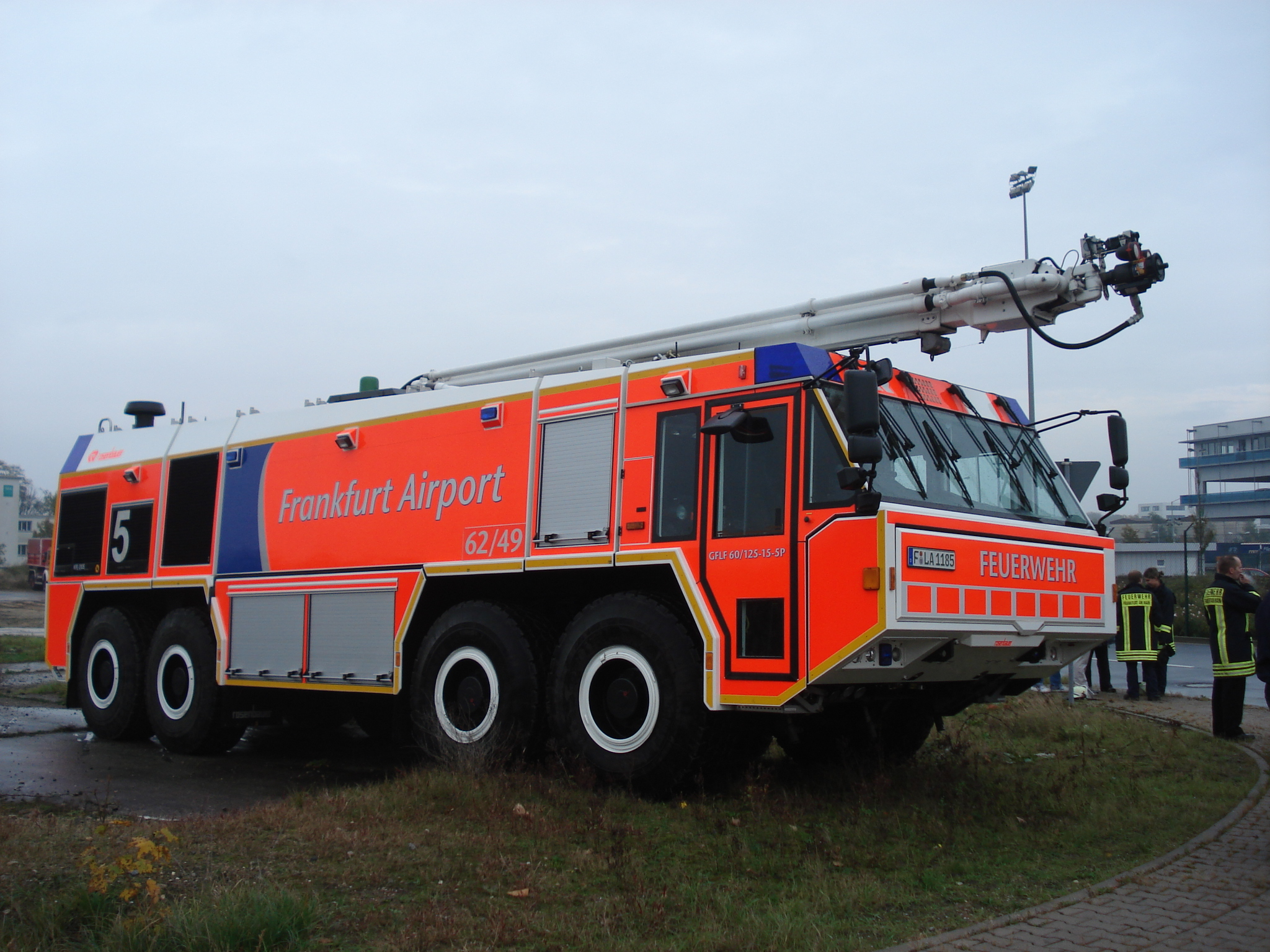
- Rosenbauer Simba 8x8 at Frankfurt Airport

Overview
- Type: Airport crash tender
- Manufacturer: Rosenbauer
- Production: 1980-1996
- Designer: Kristian Fenzl

Body and chassis
- Related: Reynold Boughton, Titan Spezialfahrzeugbau GmbH

Powertrain
- Engine: Mercedes-Benz OM
- Hybrid drivetrain: 6x6, 8x8

Chronology
- Successor: Rosenbauer Panther

The Rosenbauer Simba is an airport crash tender from the Austrian manufacturer Rosenbauer International AG. This was the first airport crash tender from the manufacturer. The prototype was designed by painter Kristian Fenzl with a chassis from Reylond Bougton and engine from Mercedes-Benz. The vehicle was developed in a 6x6 drivetrain with glazed cabin and yellow paint job. In 1980 the vehicle was showcased at Interschutz event in Hannover, Germany.

Later, the manufacturer used the Titan Spezialfahrzeugbau GmbH chassis to build their S line up, namely Simba 6x6s and 8x8s. The production of the vehicle stopped in 1996 to focus on the Rosenbauer Panther, the successor of the Simba, which was based in MAN Chassis and Volvo D16 Engine.

Models:

- Simba 6×6
- Simba 6×6s
- Simba 8×8s
