= Rosenbauer Panther =

Airport crash tender

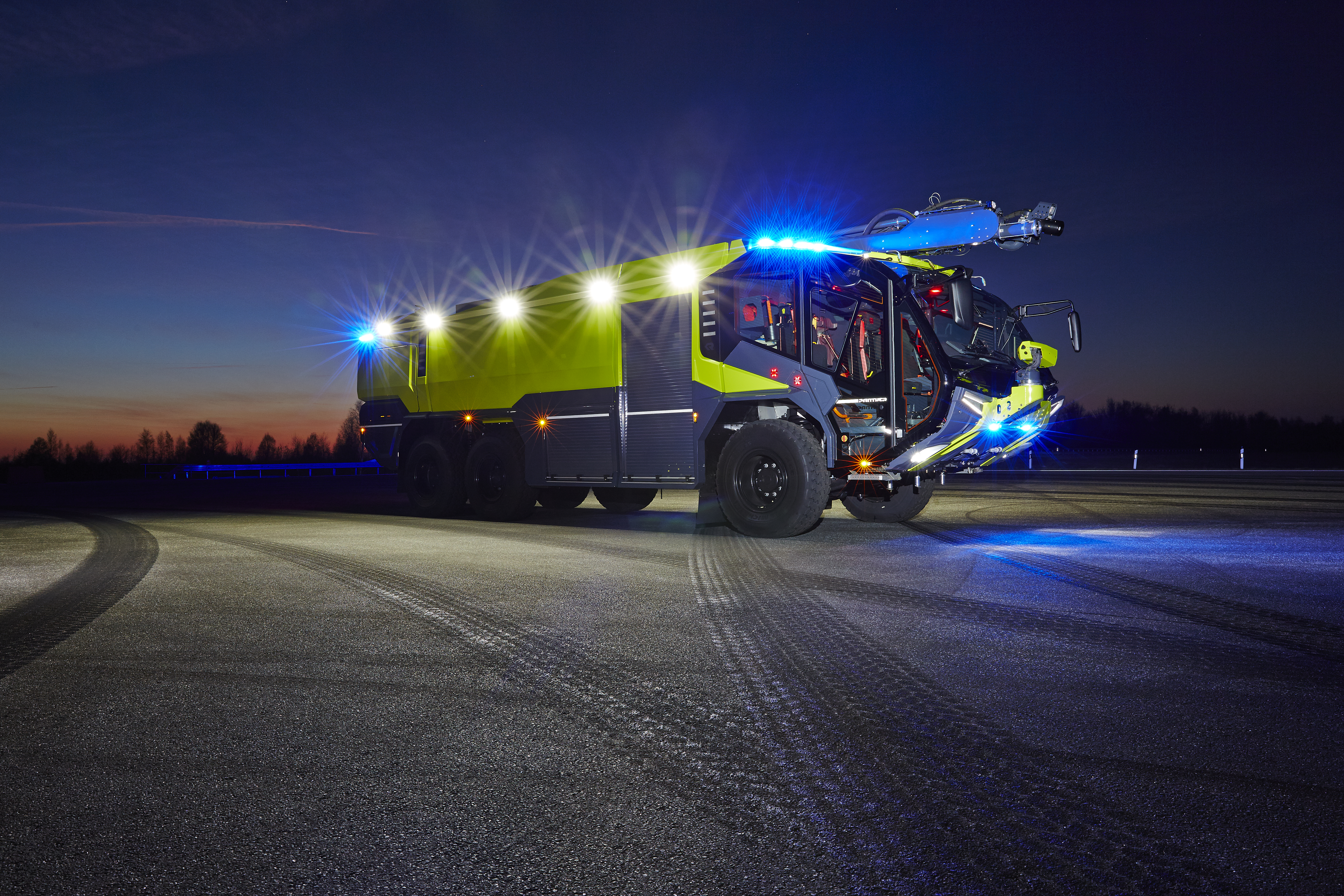

Overview
- Type: Airport Crash Tender
- Manufacturer: Rosenbauer
- Production: 1991
- Assembly: Europe, North America and Asia
- Designer: Kristian Fenzl

Body and chassis
- Platform: Rosenbauer Simba

Powertrain
- Engine: Volvo D16
- Power output: 700hp, 1400hp
- Transmission: 6-speed, 7-speed
- Hybrid drivetrain: 4×4, 6×6, 8×8

Dimensions
- Length: 10,500 mm 4×4; 11,460 mm 6×6s; 11,710 mm 6×6; 11,785 mm 6×6 electric; 12,300 mm 8×8
- Width: 3,000 mm 4×4, 6×6, 8×8; 2,500 mm 6×6s; 2,997.2 mm 6×6 electric
- Height: 3,650 mm 4×4, 6×6s; 3,657.6mm 6×6 electric; 3,750 mm 6×6; 4,000 mm 8×8
- Curb weight: 26,000 kg 4×4; 33,000 kg 6×6s; 39,000 kg 6×6; 40,505 kg 6×6 electric; 52,000 kg 8×8c

Chronology
- Predecessor: Rosenbauer Simba

Rosenbauer Panther is a model of airport crash tender produced by Austrian manufacturer Rosenbauer.

It exists in 4×4, 6×6 and 8×8 versions, with a 6×6 electric version in development. The 8×8 version accommodates 14,500 litres (3,830 gallons) of fire extinguishing agents and a maximum speed of 140 km/h (87 mph), with an operating weight of 40 tons.

== History ==
The Panther was released in 1991 and was the second airport crash tender vehicle from the manufacturer as a successor of the Rosenbauer Simba, which was discontinued in 1996. Panther was showcased at the Hanover show. The new vehicle was designed by Kristian Fenzl based on a MAN 36.1000 VFAEG chassis, powered by a MAN 22 litre V12 charge-cooled diesel engine producing 735 kW (990 hp) at 2,300rpm. Weighing at 36 tons, the vehicle was capable of accelerating from 0–80 km/h in 25 seconds with a top speed of 140 km/h, also having an automatic gearbox and a gradability of 60%.

=== Generations ===
==== First generation (1994–2004) ====
The first-generation Rosenbauer Panther was introduced in 1994. It featured a box-shaped cab design with a flat two-piece windshield, angular bodywork, and a mechanically simpler electrical system. Early models used halogen lighting and conventional mirror assemblies. This generation established the basic layout that would define later Panther models.

==== Second generation (2005–2014) ====
The second-generation Panther entered production in 2005. It introduced a redesigned curved windshield, a more rounded cab profile, and improved aerodynamics. The vehicle incorporated upgraded pump systems and electronics while retaining the overall proportions of the first generation. This version remained in production for nearly a decade and was widely adopted by international airports and military air bases.

==== Third generation (2015–2020) ====
Rosenbauer launched the third-generation Panther in 2015. This version featured an updated cab with more angular styling, fully integrated LED lighting, revised mirror housings, and a more modern dashboard layout. Mechanical improvements included upgraded engines, enhanced pump performance, and improved suspension options. The third generation is visually identified by its aggressive front fascia and more streamlined body panels.

==== Fourth generation (2021–present) ====
The fourth-generation Panther was unveiled in 2021. It introduced a complete redesign of the cab with expanded visibility, thin LED light bars, and a modular electronics platform. This generation supports hybrid and alternative-powertrain configurations and includes improved safety systems such as advanced driver-assistance system. It is currently the newest iteration of the Panther family.

The Panther can carry 10,000-14,000 litres of water, 1,000-2,000 litres of foaming agent and up to 500 kg of powder. The vehicle usually has an 8×8 drivetrain, but smaller vehicles with 4×4 and 6×6 drivetrain were also manufactured. These became available in May 1992.

== Models ==
- Panther 4×4
- Panther 6×6s
- Panther 6×6
- Panther 6×6 electric
- Panther 8×8

== Capacity ==
Models	Water (ltr)	Foam (ltr)	Powder (kg)	Output (l/min)
Panther 4×4	6,200	750	250	7,000
Panther 6×6s	9,100	1,200	250	6,500
Panther 6×6	11,400	1,400	250	9,000
Panther 6×6 electric	12,000	1438.5	250	7949.4
Panther 8×8	12,500	750×2	500	9,000

== Operators ==
- Australia: Royal Australian Air Force
- Austria: Vienna International Airport, Innsbruck Airport, Linz Airport
- Bangladesh: Civil Aviation Authority of Bangladesh
- Belarus: Minsk National Airport
- Belgium: Belgian Air Force, Brussels Airport, Liège Airport
- Bolivia: Navegación Aérea y Aeropuertos Bolivianos
- Brazil: São Paulo/Guarulhos International Airport
- Bosnia and Herzegovina: Sarajevo International Airport
- Botswana: Civil Aviation Authority of Botswana
- Bulgaria: Vasil Levski Sofia Airport
- Cambodia: Phnom Penh International Airport,Siem Reap International Airport, Sihanouk International Airport
- Canada: Toronto Pearson International Airport
- Cape Verde: Aeroportos e Segurança Aérea
- China: Beijing Capital International Airport, Tianjin Binhai International Airport
  - Hong Kong: Hong Kong International Airport
  - Macau: Macau International Airport
- Colombia: Gabriel Vargas Santos Airport, El Edén International Airport, Alfredo Vásquez Cobo International Airport
- Croatia: Zagreb Airport, Split Airport
- Cyprus: Larnaca International Airport
- Czech Republic: Václav Havel Airport Prague
- Denmark: Royal Danish Air Force, Copenhagen Airport
  - Greenland: Greenland Airports
- Ecuador: Quito International Airport
- Egypt: Cairo International Airport
- Fiji: Nadi International Airport
- Finland: Helsinki Airport
- France: Charles de Gaulle Airport, Lyon–Saint-Exupéry Airport
  - New Caledonia: La Tontouta International Airport
- Germany: Dortmund Airport, Frankfurt Airport, Munich Airport, Nuremberg Airport, Stuttgart Airport
- Hungary: Budapest Ferenc Liszt International Airport
- India: Indira Gandhi International Airport, Kempegowda International Airport, Cochin International Airport
- Iran: Ahwaz Airport
- Iraq: Baghdad International Airport
- Ireland: Dublin Airport, Ireland West Airport, Shannon Airport, Donegal Airport, Waterford Airport
- Israel: Israeli Air Force, Ramon Airport
- Japan: Japan Air Self-Defense Force, Kansai International Airport,Hanamaki Airport, Sendai Airport
- Jordan: King Hussein International Airport
- Kazakhstan: Astana International Airport
- Latvia: Riga International Airport
- Lithuania: Kaunas International Airport, Palanga International Airport
- Luxembourg: Luxembourg Airport
- Malta: Malta International Airport
- Mauritius: Sir Seewoosagur Ramgoolam International Airport
- Montenegro: Podgorica Airport,Tivat Airport
- Morocco: Mohammed V International Airport
- Myanmar: Mandalay International Airport
- Nepal: Civil Aviation Authority of Nepal
- The Netherlands: Amsterdam Airport Schiphol, Rotterdam The Hague Airport
  - Aruba: Queen Beatrix International Airport
  - Sint Maarten: Princess Juliana International Airport
- New Zealand: Wellington Airport, Auckland Airport, Christchurch Airport
- Papua New Guinea: Lae Nadzab Airport
- Peru: Peruvian Air Force, Jorge Chávez International Airport
- Philippines: Ninoy Aquino International Airport
- Poland: Warsaw Chopin Airport, Kraków John Paul II International Airport
- Portugal: Lisbon Airport
- Russia: Vnukovo International Airport
- Saint Kitts and Nevis: Robert L. Bradshaw International Airport
- Saint Lucia: George F. L. Charles Airport
- Saudi Arabia: King Khalid International Airport
- Singapore: Changi Airport
- Serbia: Belgrade Nikola Tesla Airport, Niš Constantine the Great Airport
- Slovakia: Bratislava Airport
- Slovenia: Fraport Aviation Academy
- South Africa: Lanseria International Airport
- South Korea: Gyeongnam Fire Department, Wolseong Nuclear Power Plant, Incheon International Airport
- Taiwan: Taoyuan Fire Department, Kaohsiung International Airport, Tainan Airport
- Thailand: Suvarnabhumi Airport, Chiang Mai International Airport, U-Tapao International Airport
- Timor-Leste: Oecusse Airport
- Tunisia: Tunis–Carthage International Airport
- Turkey: Istanbul Airport
- Ukraine: Boryspil International Airport
- United Arab Emirates: Dubai International Airport, Zayed International Airport
- United Kingdom: Heathrow Airport, Edinburgh Airport, Belfast International Airport, Glasgow Airport
  - Anguilla: Clayton J. Lloyd International Airport
  - Bermuda: L.F. Wade International Airport
  - Gibraltar: Gibraltar International Airport
- United States: United States Air Force, Fort Lauderdale–Hollywood International Airport, Dallas Fort Worth International Airport, Port of Seattle, Los Angeles International Airport.
- Uruguay: Rivera International Airport, Nueva Hespérides International Airport
- Vietnam: Noi Bai International Airport, Tan Son Nhat International Airport, Da Nang International Airport

== Gallery ==
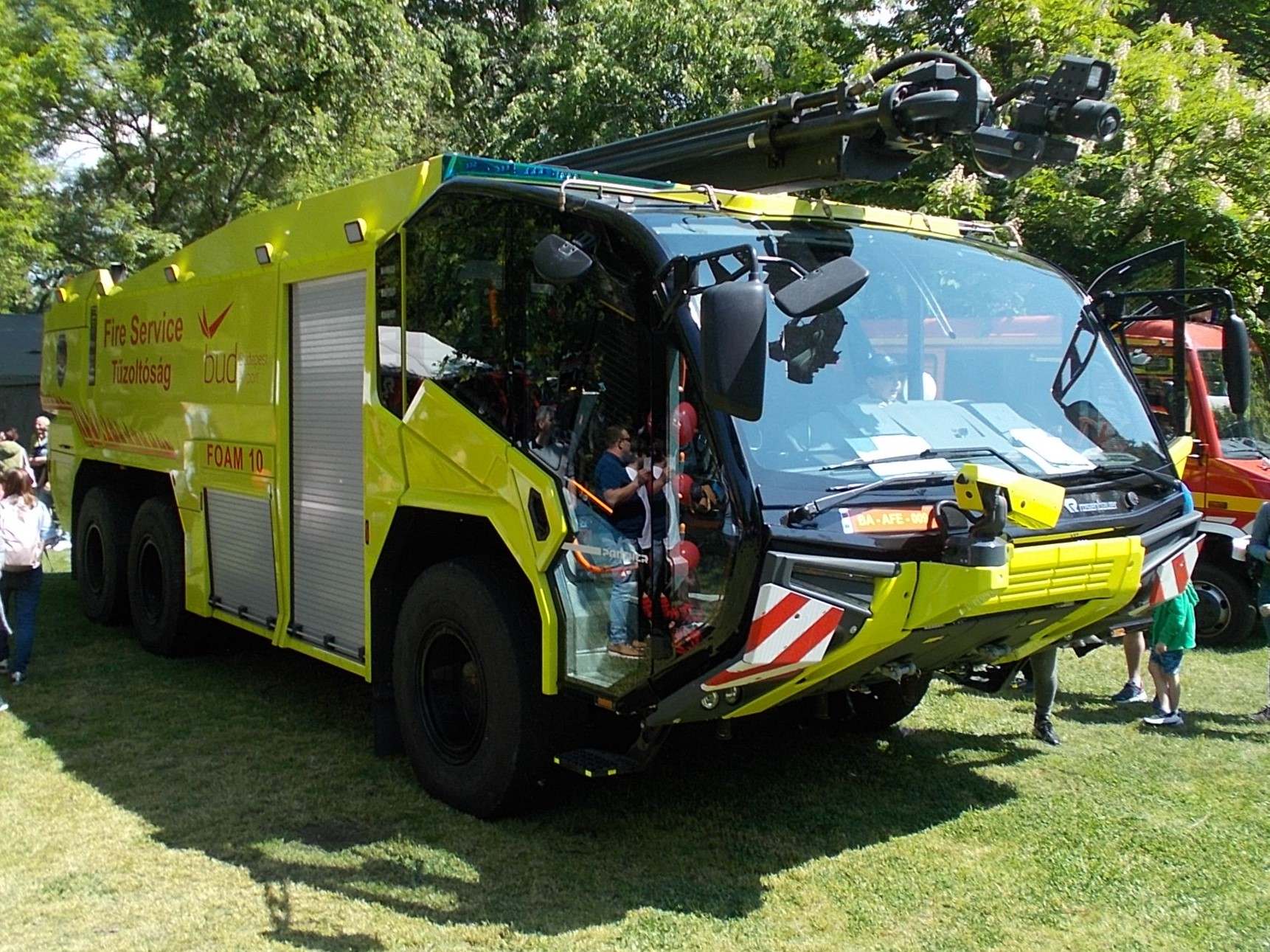
Budapest Airport’s Panther 6x6.

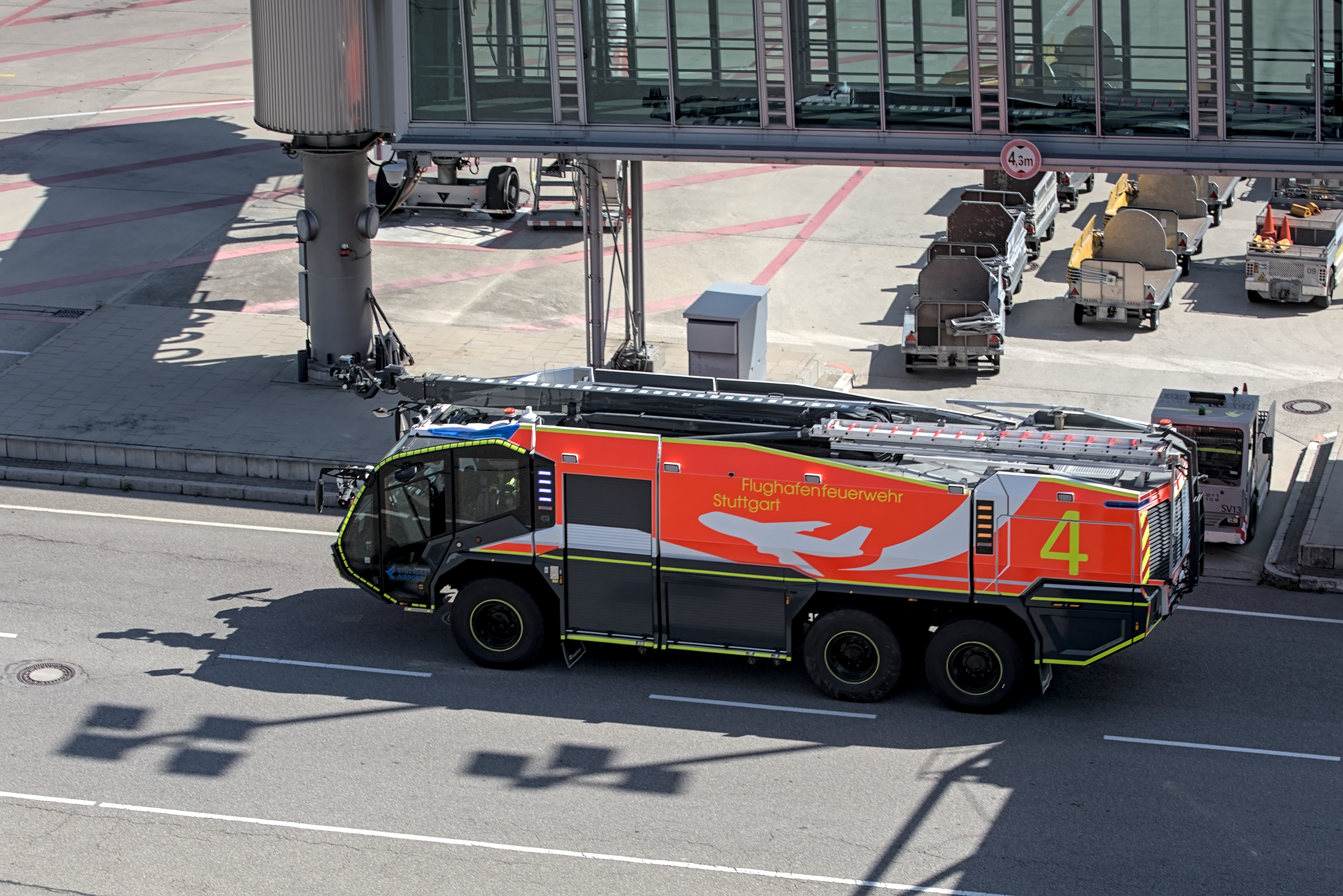
Stuttgart Airport’s Panther 6x6.

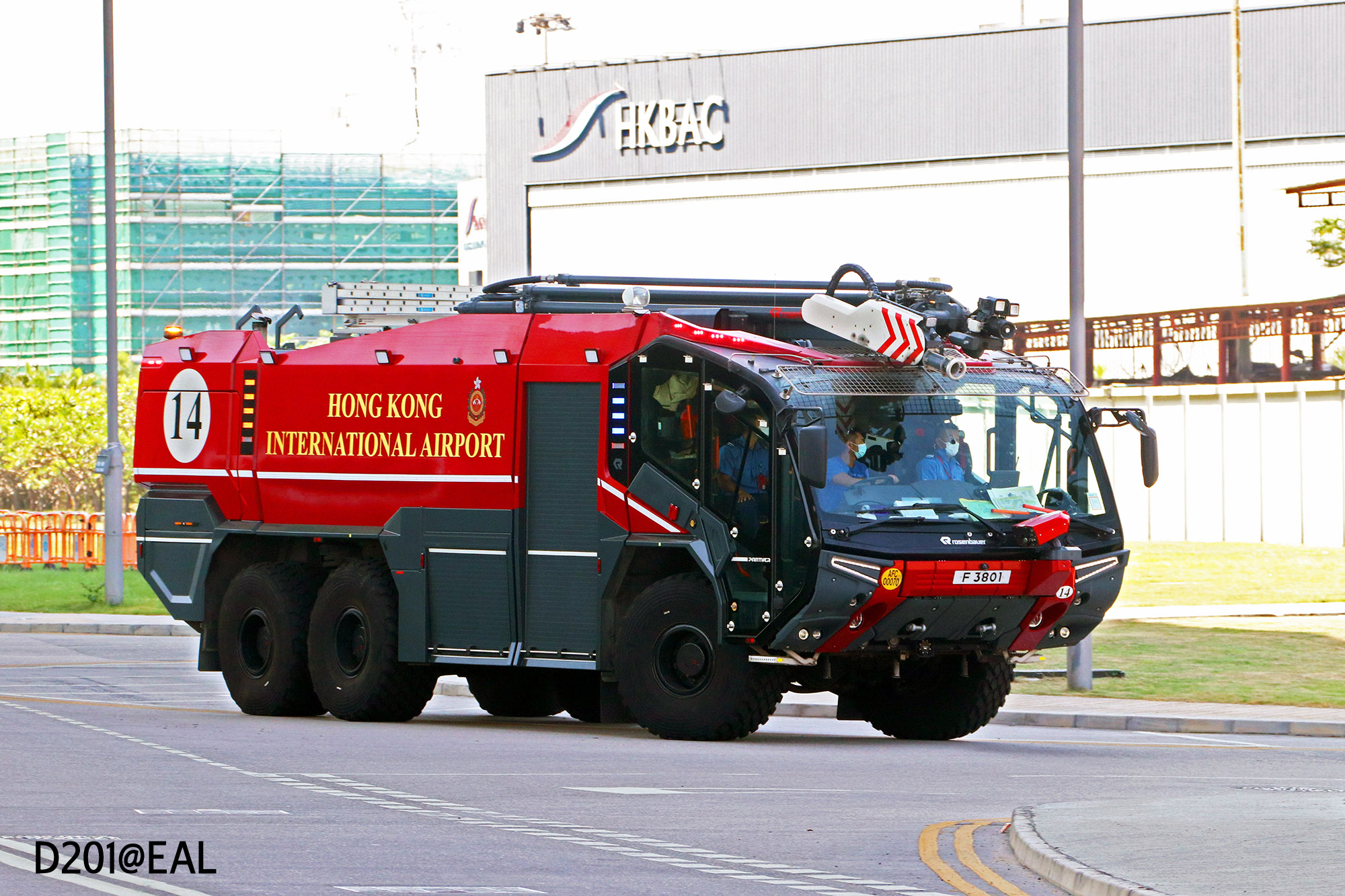
Hong Kong International Airport’s Panther 6x6.

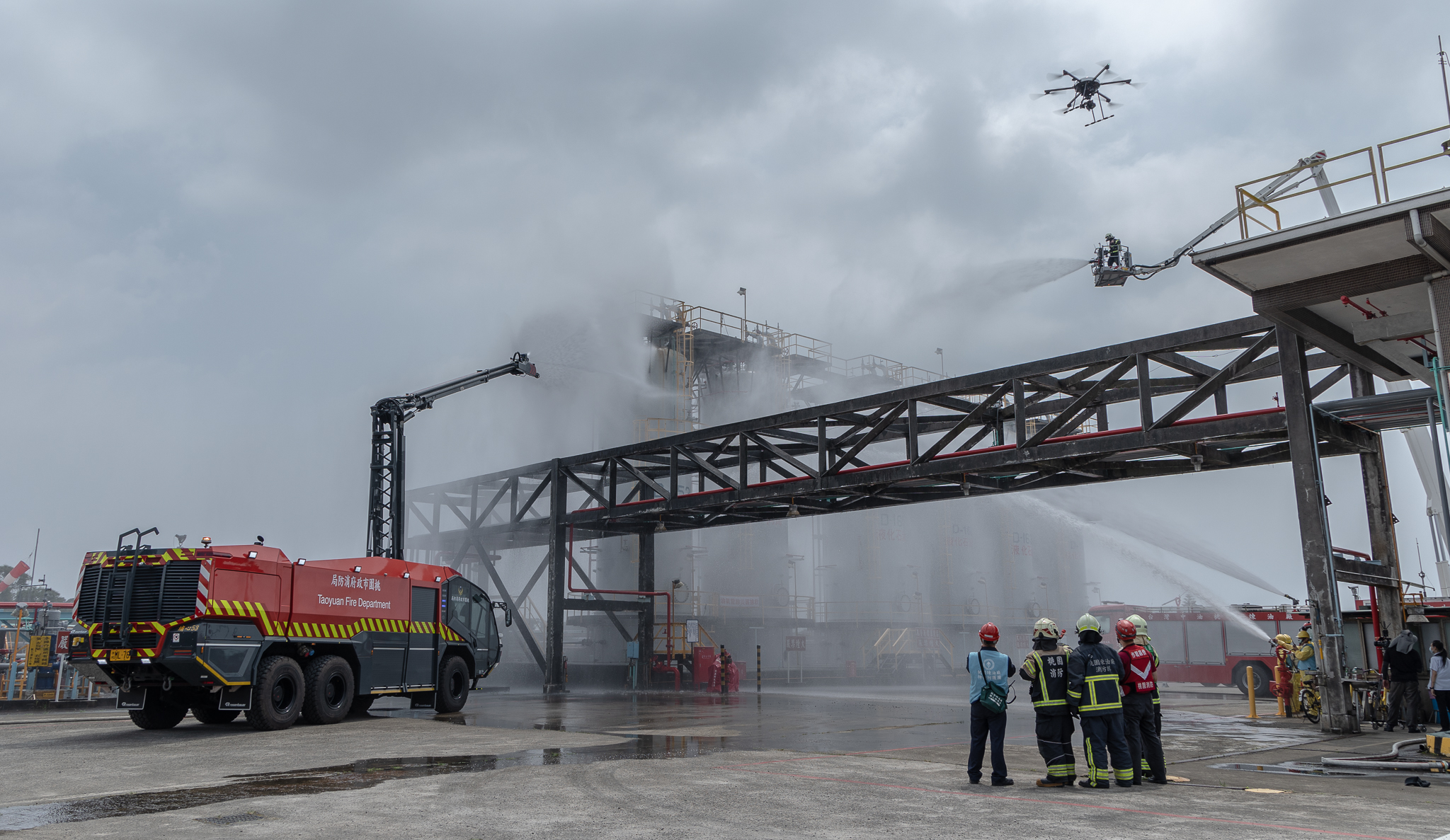
Taoyuan Fire Department’s Panther 6x6 in disaster relief exercise.

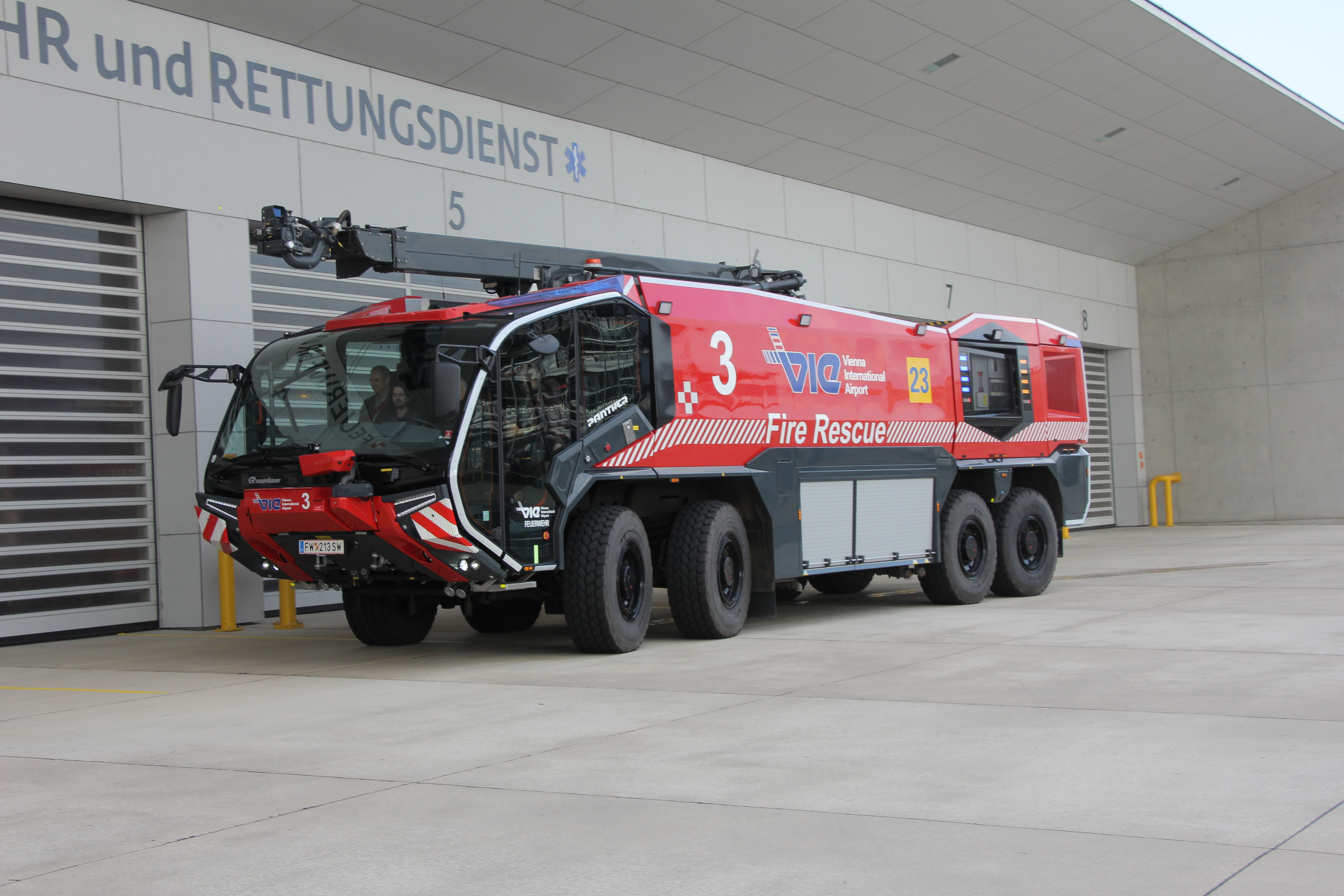
Vienna Airport’s Panther 8x8.

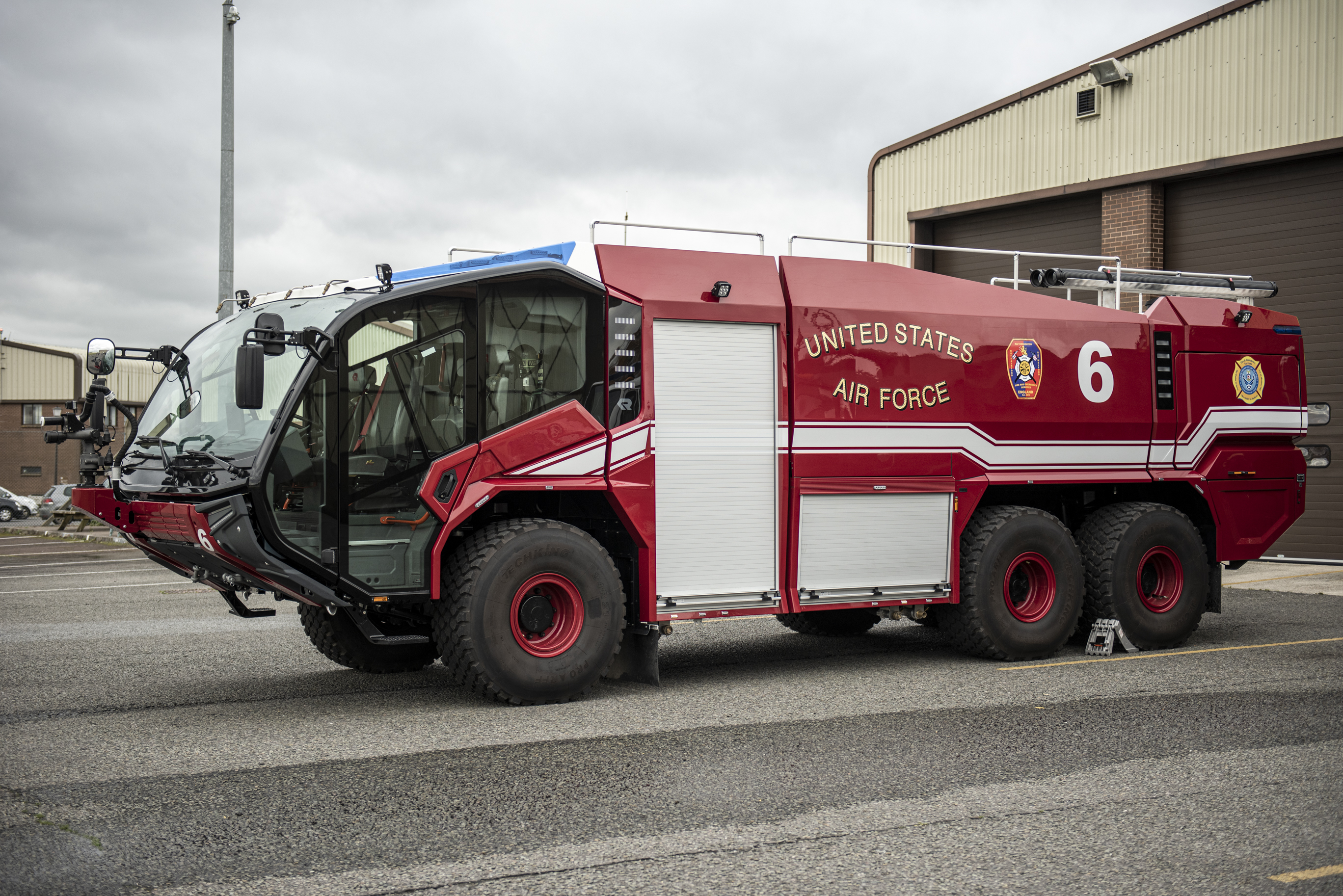
A USAF Panther 6x6.

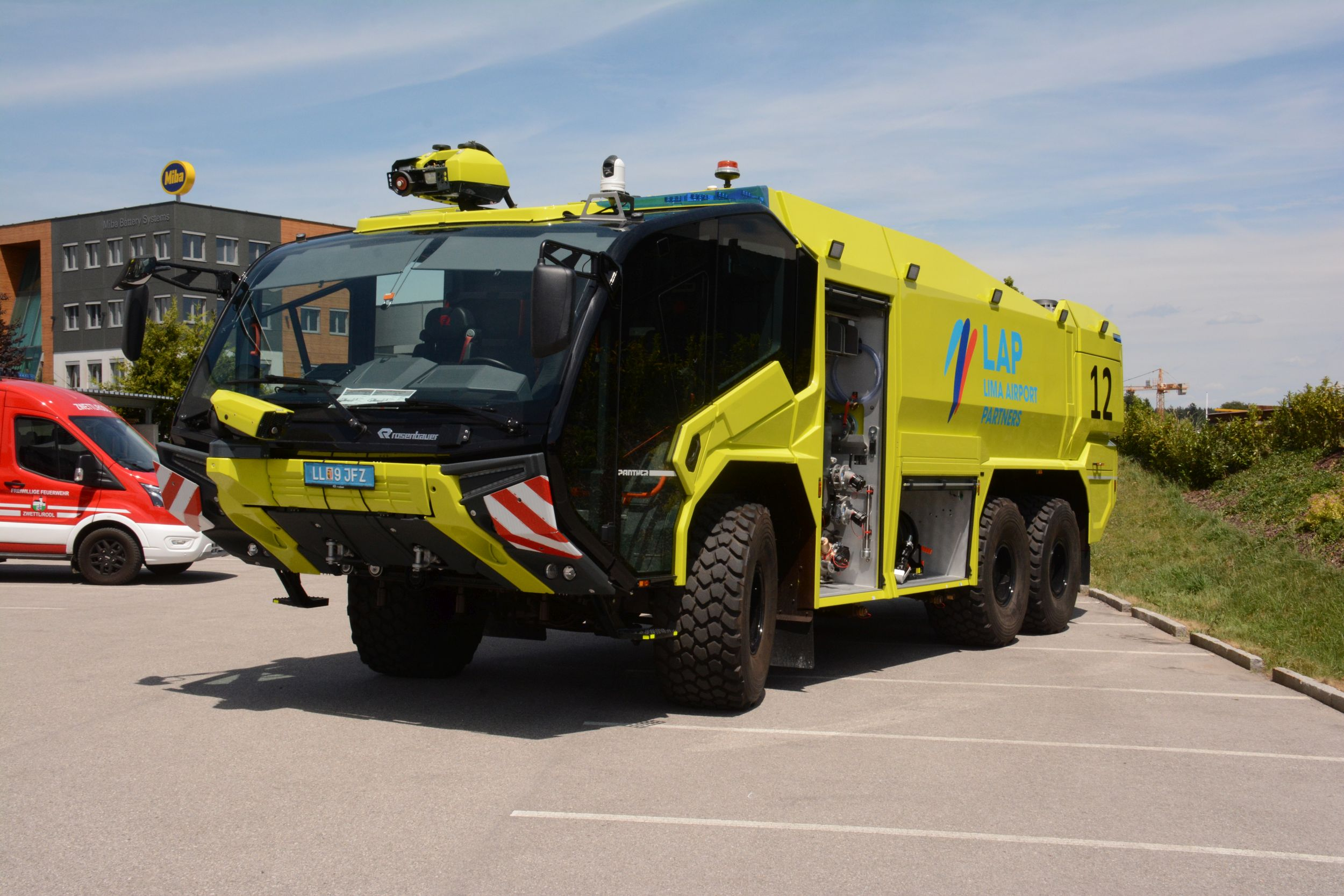
Lima Airport’s Panther 6x6 in exhibition.

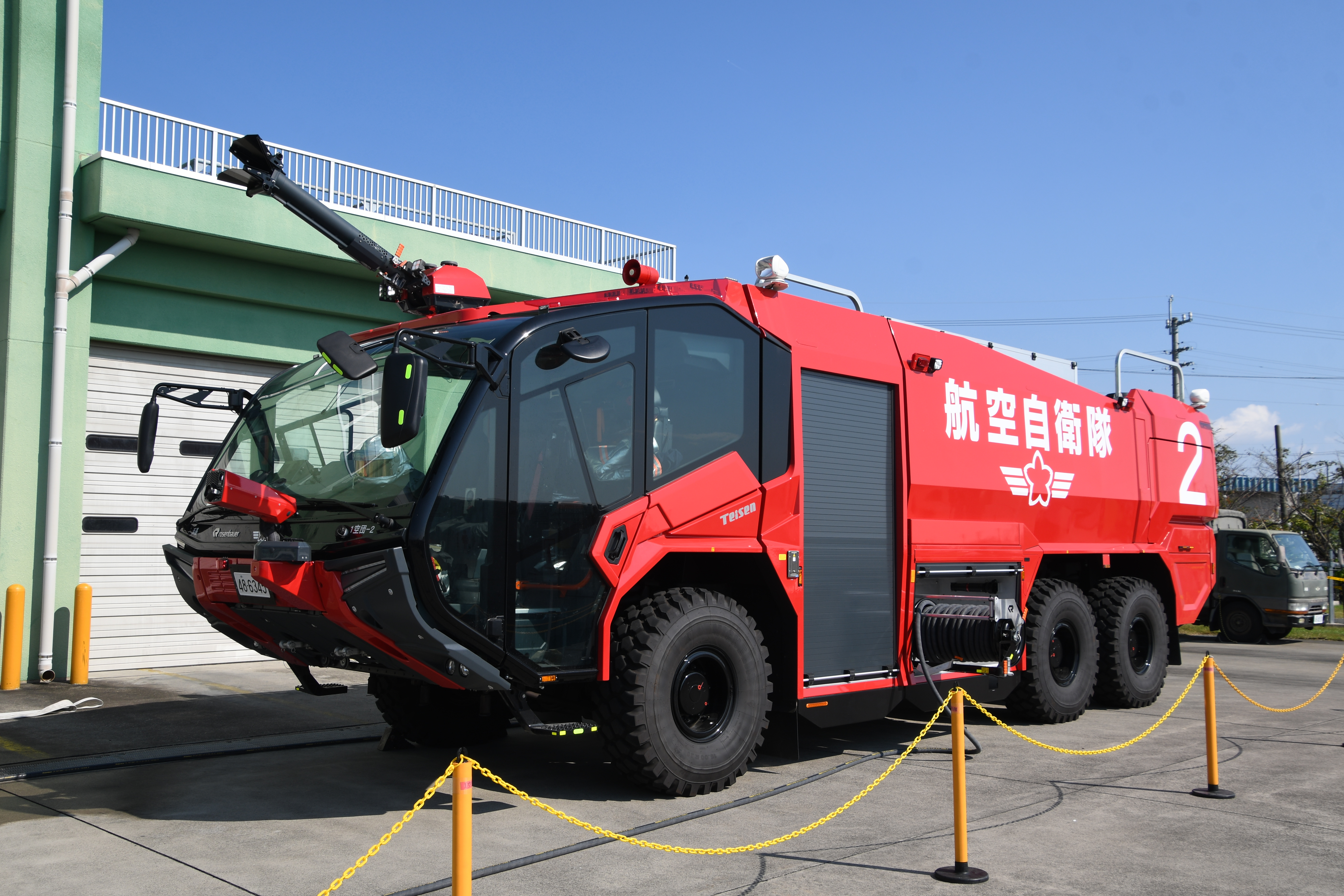
JASDF Panther 6x6 in exhibition.

== In popular culture ==
The Rosenbauer Panther appears in the 2011 film Transformers: Dark of the Moon, where the character Sentinel Prime transforms into a 2001 Panther 6×6 airport crash tender. The truck used for filming had a unique red-and-black color scheme not typically used for U.S. airport ARFF vehicles.

== See also ==
- Rosenbauer Simba
