= ABC dry chemical =

Dry extinguishing agent for firefighting

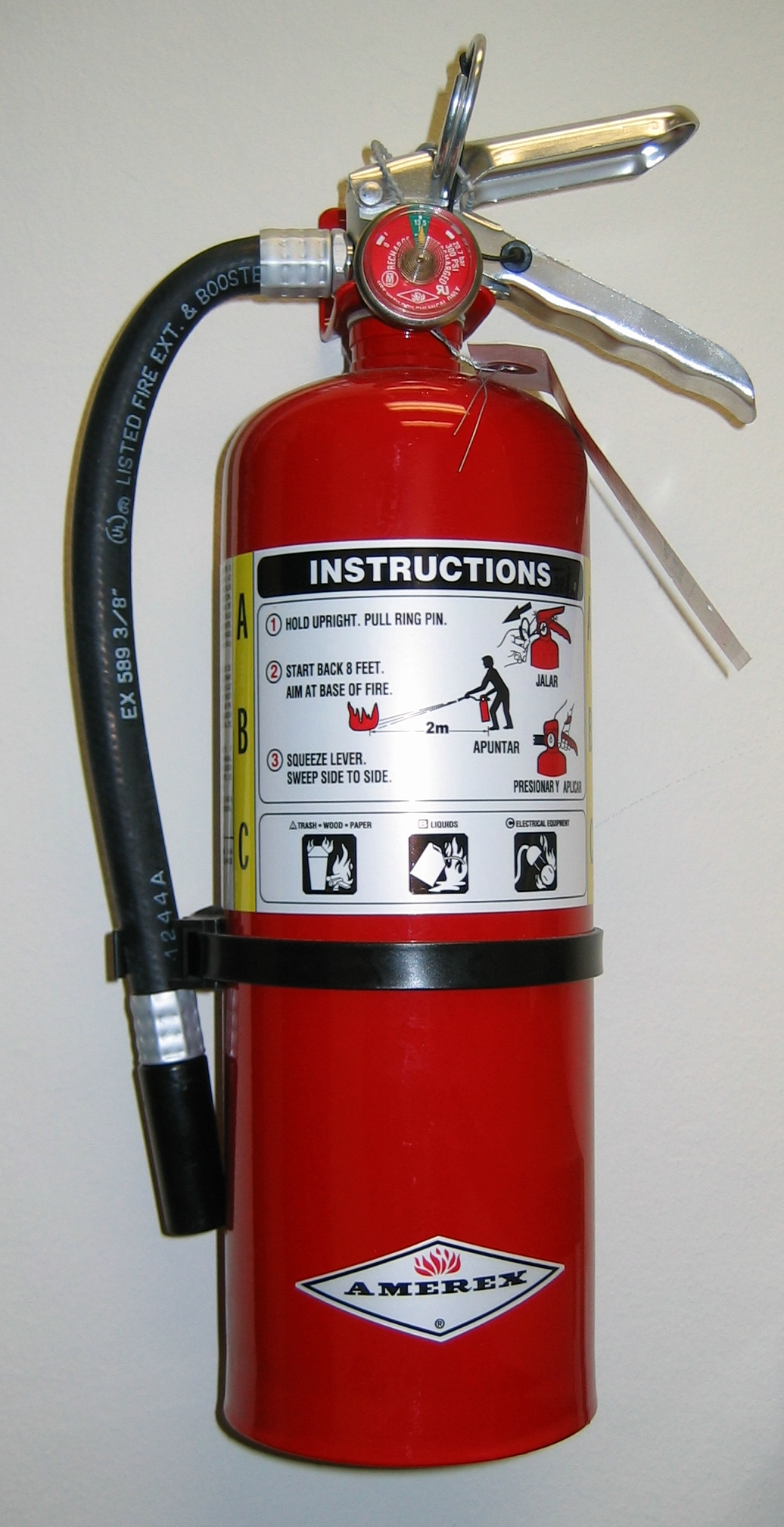
An ABC dry chemical fire extinguisher made by Amerex

Monoammonium phosphate, ABC dry chemical, ABC powder, tri-class, or multi-purpose dry chemical is a dry chemical extinguishing agent used on class A, class B, and electrical fires. It uses a specially fluidized and siliconized monoammonium phosphate powder. ABC dry chemical is usually a mix of monoammonium phosphate and ammonium sulfate, the former being the active component. The mix between the two agents is usually 40–60%, 60–40%, or 90–10% depending on local standards worldwide. The USGS uses a similar mixture, called Phos Chek G75F.

== Uses ==
=== Common use ===
Dry chemical powder is used on all classes of fires. Dry chemical powder puts out the fire by coating the burning material with a thin layer of dust, thereby separating the fuel from the oxygen in the air. The powder also works to interrupt the chemical reaction of fire, so these extinguishers are extremely effective at putting out the fire. Pressure is generated by gas cartridges stored inside the cylinder. Its force will last for 45 seconds and can reach 3–4.5 metres (10–15 ft).

=== Common combustible solids ===
It insulates Class A fires by melting at approximately 180–200 °C (350–400 °F). Class A fires are caused by the burning of common combustible materials, such as wood, paper, or most plastics.

=== Burning liquids and gases ===
The powder breaks the chain reaction of liquid and gas fires by coating the surface to which it is applied. These fires (Class B in the US system; Classes B and C in the European and Australian systems) include the burning of gasoline, oil, propane, and natural gas.

=== Electrical fires ===
It is safe and effective for electrical fires since it is a non-conductor of electricity. Fires involving live electrical equipment (Class C in the US system; Class E in the Australian system) need to be put out with equipment that will not conduct its energy back to the user as is the case with water. Electricity can also cause fires of the other classes.

=== Chimney bombs ===
Chimney bombs are zip-lock bags or other small bags filled with ABC dry chemical powder. Chimney bombs are used by fire service personnel to help extinguish chimney fires. Creosote, which is the by-product of the incomplete burning of wood (typically due to chronic combustion-air insufficiency), is extinguished by the chain reaction caused by the chimney bombs. Chimney bombs work by first being dropped directly down a chimney, where upon contact with the flue bottom and heat of the fire, they explode, thereby releasing the powder. Then, the natural chimney draft will carry the dry chemical powder up the shaft of the chimney, thus coating the creosote and eventually neutralizing the fire. Use of multiple chimney bombs may be necessary, depending on how severe the fire is. Chimney bombs can also be effective if they are opened and then dropped down the chimney. In order for chimney bombs to be effective, it may be necessary to first unclog the chimney.

== Inappropriate uses ==
ABC dry chemical is inappropriate for chlorine or oxidizer fires. The resulting chemical reaction can cause an explosion or a breakdown of the chemicals releasing toxic gases. Water should be used in that case.

ABC dry chemical is inappropriate for certain metal fires (Class-D) and does not possess a saponification characteristic and should therefore not be used on Class K / Class F fires. ABC dry chemical has been found to be effective in initially ceasing combustion of oils or fats, however re-application of additional dry chemical may be necessary due to the potential for re-flash of oils or fats heated to near or at their flash point. A Class K / Class F extinguisher is more effective in controlling fires involving primarily vegetable oils as it causes a chemical change to the oils or fats making re-flash far less likely. When a Class K / Class F extinguisher is not available an ABC dry chemical extinguisher can be carefully used to control a fire involving cooking oils or fats if the operator is aware of the potential need to re-apply more chemical if the oils or fats reignite. (Class-K).

Due to the corrosive properties of ABC dry chemical, it is not recommended for use around aircraft or sensitive equipment.

Fire class (US system)	Geometric symbol	Pictogram	Intended use	Mnemonic	Compatibility
A			Ordinary solid combustibles	A for "Ash"	Compatible
B			Flammable liquids and gases	B for "Barrel"	Compatible
C			Energized electrical equipment	C for "Current"	Compatible
D			Combustible metals	D for "Dynamite"	Not compatible
K			Oils and fats	K for "Kitchen"	Not compatible

== Recycling ==
The powder contains monoammonium phosphate, with the phosphate being a globally valuable material. See the references for links to recycling research projects and companies.
