= John J. Eagan (industrialist) =

American industrialist

John Joseph Eagan (April 22, 1870, in Griffin, Georgia – March 30, 1924, in Asheville, North Carolina) was an American industrialist and co-founder of the American Cast Iron Pipe Company (ACIPCO).

Eagan was the son and only child of John Joseph and Mary V. Russell Eagan of Georgia. His father died of tuberculosis on July 19, 1870. His uncle William Russell, who owned the W. A. Russell Tobacco Company in Atlanta, moved Mary and John to Atlanta. John was studious and excelled in school, studied the Bible and was active, along with his mother, in Christian ministry at Central Presbyterian Church in Atlanta. The Eagans also lived for periods of time with Mary's sister in Cartersville and on the farm of a family friend.

At age 16, Eagan left school and returned to Atlanta. He worked at a grocery store briefly until starting work at his uncle's tobacco store. At age 21, John inherited $6,000 from his grandmother. He invested the money and by 1899 had a fortune of over $73,000. When Eagan was 29, he inherited a $750,000 bequest from his uncle Russell. Eagan continued investing in property, stocks and a few businesses. Humbled by his blessings, Eagan tithed to the church, supported numerous charities benefiting the poor, and used his business influence to improve conditions for workers. A May 13, 1900, entry in Eagan's diary included this prayer: "O Lord show me how to invest Thy wealth to promote Thy glory, so that I may bear much fruit."

Although Eagan had prospered in the tobacco business inherited from his uncle, he did not believe this should be his life's work. In an April 7, 1901, diary entry, Eagan wrote: "My chief end is to glorify God. I believe there are fields of endeavor where I can glorify Him more than in this business. Therefore it is my duty to get into the field where I can glorify Him most."

In 1905, Charlotte Blair, secretary of Dimmick Pipe Company in Anniston, Alabama, along with her brother James W. Blair, interested several southern businessmen in the idea of starting a new pipe plant in Birmingham, Alabama. With its natural resources, access to raw materials and rail transportation, Birmingham was considered a well suited location. Eagan was one of five charter investors in the Birmingham pipe plant, which was named American Cast Iron Pipe Company and came to be recognized by the acronym ACIPCO. He served as the company's president from 1905 until 1915, when James McWane was named president and Eagan became chairman of the ACIPCO Board of Directors. McWane left ACIPCO in 1921 and Eagan began a second term as president, serving in this office until days before his death in 1924.

In accord with his Christian beliefs, and influenced by social and industrial reform movements of the day, Eagan developed a business model at ACIPCO based on the "Golden Rule". He paid good wages and kept shifts to nine hours or less with overtime and sick leave, invested in worker safety programs, and treated all employees with fairness. He also constructed affordable housing for workers, as well as schools, churches, a medical clinic, a library, a bank, and an employee-operated store. He shared the company's profits with employees.

While developing his plan for ACIPCO, Eagan bought back all the common stock of the company to become its sole owner by the end of 1921. In April 1923, Eagan added a codicil to his will placing all the company stock in a trust for employees. In Eagan's words, his object was to ensure "service both to the purchasing public and to labor on the basis of the Golden Rule." When he died on March 30, 1924, ACIPCO became an employee-owned business, electing its own members to the company's board. Eagan had suffered from tuberculosis for many years and died from one of its common complications—meningitis.

Eagan and his wife, the former Susan Baum Young, had two children, Bill and Ann. Eagan died in Asheville, North Carolina, where he had traveled in hopes of regaining his health. He is buried at Westview Cemetery in Atlanta, Georgia.

Eagan was inducted into the National Management Association Hall of Fame in 1998, the Kiwanis Club Birmingham Business Hall of Fame in 2001, and the Alabama Men's Hall of Fame in 2007. In 2014, Weld for Birmingham listed him among "50 Who Shaped Birmingham." The former John J. Eagan School in Birmingham's Acipco-Finley neighborhood was named in his honor.
