= McWane =

Plumbing manufacturer

McWane Industries, Inc.
- Type: Private
- Industry: Manufacturing, Commercial Real Estate
- Founded: 1921; 105 years ago
- Founder: J. R. McWane
- Headquarters: Birmingham, Alabama, U.S.
- Key people: C. Phillip McWane (chairman); Will McWane (president)
- Products: Pipes, fittings, valves, hydrants, compressed air tanks, fire extinguishers, fire suppression systems, hotels, self-storage businesses, warehousing
- Revenue: $3.4 billion USD (2025)
- Number of employees: 6,000
- Website: www.mcwane.com

McWane Industries, Inc. is one of the world's largest manufacturers of iron water works and plumbing products and one of America's largest privately owned companies. The company manufactures a host of different products including ductile iron pipe and fittings, cast iron soil pipe and fittings, heavy duty couplings, utility poles, and related products. McWane is also a manufacturer of pressurized cylinders for the storage of propane and other gases through its Manchester Tank and Equipment Company division and tank refurbishment and recertification through its Ditech Testing division, as well as fire protection systems and extinguishers through its Amerex subsidiary. Additionally, McWane owns and operates hotels, self-storage businesses and industrial warehousing through Highline Real Estate.

Based in Birmingham, Alabama, McWane is a family-owned company employing more than 6,000 team members in over 20 locations worldwide. In addition to the United States, the company has international operations in Canada, China, and India. McWane’s products are used across Asia and the Pacific, Europe, South America and nearly everywhere in North America. McWane's operating revenues were estimated at approximately $3.4 billion in 2025.

== History ==
J. R. McWane founded the McWane Cast Iron Pipe Company in 1921 in Birmingham, Alabama, where it has maintained its headquarters since. McWane introduced innovations to foundry technologies and processes. He also introduced progressive initiatives to improve working conditions. In 1920, one year before the founding of McWane, J.R. McWane wrote, "The industry that maintains an army of workers without regard to their working and living conditions, their health, recreations, religious and social life cannot succeed in the largest sense." His vision is referred to within the company as "The McWane Way", and can be summarized as aiming to improve both the methods of work and the lives of the workers, rather than focusing solely on financial gain.

== Growth and expansion ==
=== Domestic acquisitions ===
The company has grown mainly through acquisition of other domestic foundries and related enterprises. In 1926, the company opened its first subsidiary, the Pacific States Cast Iron Pipe Company. Later, McWane acquired Empire Coke Company in 1962, Atlantic States Cast Iron Pipe Company in 1975, and Union Foundry Company in 1977. Between 1984 and 1996, the company continued its expansion with the acquisition of the following companies, M&H Valve Company, Clow Water Systems, Clow Valve Company, Kennedy Valve Company, Tyler Pipe and Anaco. In 1999, McWane bought two more companies: Manchester Tank & Equipment of Brentwood, Tennessee and Amerex Corporation of Trussville, Alabama, expanding its manufacturing of fire extinguishers. In 2008, McWane Poles developed a new product for the electric utility industry that is used by such companies as the Florida Keys Electric Cooperative. Then, in 2012, McWane entered into the technology industry by adding Synapse Wireless and Nighthawk, a provider for wireless smart grid solutions.

=== International expansion ===
McWane's international expansion began in 1989 when it acquired Canada Pipe Company in Hamilton, Ontario, then part of Canron Inc. of Toronto. The company established Clow Canada in 1990 with manufacturing in Saint John, New Brunswick; the Saint John works had previously operated as Thomas McAvity & Company from 1834 to 1960 before being sold to Crane Canada Ltd. Through Canada Pipe, McWane acquired the Bibby Companies in 1997 and in 1999 extended operations to Australia with the acquisition of Manchester Tank & Equipment Company. In 2005, McWane built the Tyler Xian Xian Foundry Company, in Hebei, China and in 2010, McWane acquired Manchester Tank & Equipment Cemcogas SA in Santiago, Chile. Through its Amerex subsidiary, McWane also acquired Solberg Scandinavian AS, a Bergen, Norway-based firefighting foam manufacturer. The company added Seoul-based Comtech Korea and Ontario-based Futurecom in 2012 and acquired UK-based Zinwave in 2014. In 2015, it opened its first manufacturing plant in Abu Dhabi called McWane Gulf. In June 2024, Manchester Tank & Equipment announced it would acquire the tank refurbishment and recertification business assets of Ditech Testing, a Canadian firm with operations in New Brunswick and Alberta.

=== China ===
In 2003, in response to increasing pressure to move operations overseas due to competition from importers, McWane filed a petition with the International Trade Commission asking for relief from Chinese competition. The commission unanimously approved McWane's petition and recommended that President George W. Bush impose a three-year import quota on China's waterworks fittings and tariffs of up to 50 percent on imports exceeding the quota. However, in March 2004, President Bush decided not to adopt the commission's recommendation. Following this decision, McWane opted to begin manufacturing its products both domestically and overseas. To that end, in 2005, it opened a plant in China's Hebei Province. The company was named the "Excellent Environmental Protection Facility of 2006" by the Cangzhou Environmental Protection Bureau.

== Environmental and safety issues ==
Following McWane's rapid growth in the 1990s, it was reported that the company had an increased number of health and safety violations. In 2002, the New York Times and others revealed serious workplace safety and environmental violations leading to fines and criminal convictions. In 2003, a series of joint print and broadcast reports by the New York Times, PBS and Canadian Broadcast Corporation reported serious safety and environmental problems at McWane plants. According to the reports, there were 4,600 recorded injuries, nine deaths and more than 400 Occupational Safety and Health Administration violations between 1995 and 2003.

=== Criminal and civil violations ===
Following the media reports, the Justice Department and the Environmental Protection Agency (EPA) launched an intensive investigation into McWane's safety and environmental practices. Federal regulators brought formal charges against McWane facilities and managers, resulting in $25 million in fines and prison sentences of up to 70 months for four McWane plant managers. Regulators also charged McWane with more than 400 air and water quality violations. The company resolved the bulk of the environmental violations in 2010, when it agreed to pay $4 million in civil penalties and spend another $9.1 million on environmental projects in communities near its plants. This agreement covered 28 of the company's manufacturing facilities in 14 states, and resolves violations including the Clean Air Act. the Clean Water Act, the Emergency Planning and Community Right-to-Know Act, Toxic Substances Control Act, the Safe Drinking Water Act, and three other federal acts. McWane's President said the agreement was "the beginning of the final chapter" in McWane's effort to be in full compliance.

PBS Frontline aired an updated version of "A Dangerous Business" entitled "A Dangerous Business Revisited" on February 5, 2008, on most PBS stations throughout the United States. Included in this version was additional reporting regarding federal prosecutions against McWane, Inc. since the original airing, as well as checking the OSHA data to verify whether McWane, Inc.'s new safety standards have made working conditions truly safer for its foundry employees.

=== Commitment to safety and environment ===
Prior to the media reports, the company had been implementing changes to its operating practices since 2000, according to McWane's president. Following the 2003 investigations, McWane continued to reform its safety and environmental practices, bringing on new management and implementing new safety procedures. The company replaced 90 percent of its senior management and added 125 new environmental, health and safety, and human resources positions since 1999. In addition, McWane spent over $300 million on environmental protection and health and safety (EHS), and implemented a centralised EHS management system to detect environmental, and health and safety problems. It also began self-reporting oversights to authorities. McWane updated its Ethics and Compliance Policy and created a training and educational program for EHS and management skills. To ensure legal compliance, the company implemented oversight mechanisms and incentive schemes, including internal and external (third party) audits and a financial incentive program for managers based upon EHS performance, an appropriate range of disciplinary actions for noncompliance, along with a confidential, 24-hour phone line for reporting suspected violations and other concerns.

=== Independent review and recognition ===
In a 2006 letter to the EPA, international president of the United Steelworkers Leo Gerard wrote that McWane's current management "has shown a dramatic change in attitude" and that "current safety practices at McWane are as good as or better than any of its competitors." During sentencing of the company in a case regarding environmental damages in New Jersey, U.S. District Court Judge Mary Cooper concluded, "A night and day difference has been accomplished, not by wishful thinking, but by determined and sustained effort at all levels. They are determined to continue to serve in all the ways that they serve and to do everything they can to prevent environmental, health, and safety damage to anyone."

As a result of the changes implemented by McWane, the company and its operating divisions and subsidiaries have received local and national recognition and awards. The company's Union Foundry has won safety awards, including Alabama's highest safety award from the Alabama Department of Industrial Relations. The company's Pacific States plant received both the Utah Department of Environmental Quality's Outstanding Achievement in Pollution Prevention Award and the Provo/Orem Chamber of Commerce's "Business of the Year" award in 2007. In 2008, the Birmingham Business Journal named McWane's president as its Green Business Leader of the Year.

Five McWane plants have been admitted into OSHA's Voluntary Protection Programs (VPP) and designated as VPP Star Sites, which recognize exemplary health and safety programs, a status that fewer than 1% of all U.S. workplaces attain. In 2023, Clow Valve and M&H Valve received the American Foundry Society Safe Year Award, a recognition that commends AFS corporate member facilities for achieving an impressive milestone of one year (365 consecutive calendar days) without a lost-time incident. Clow Valve and Kennedy Valve also received the 2023 AFS Safety & Insight Award for Ergonomics, and M&H Valve received the 2023 AFS Safety & Insight Award for Ergonomics and Health. In 2024, McWane Ductile was recognized with the New Jersey Governor’s Award for Safety and Health Excellence for employers who are committed to improving their safety and health programs and who have injury and illness rates below their industry average.

== Philanthropy ==
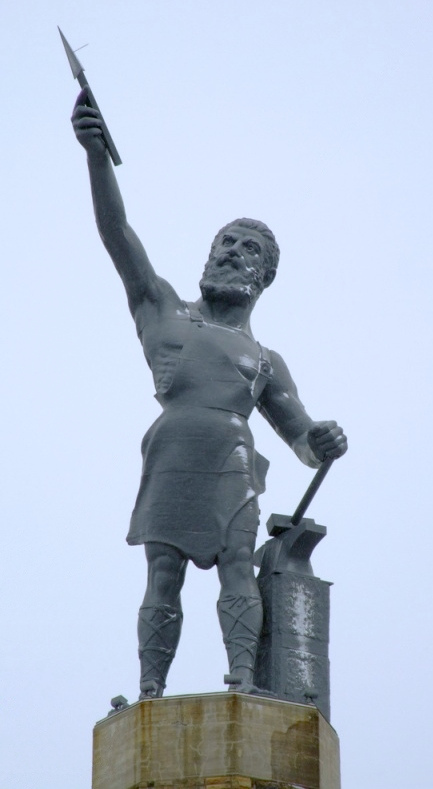
Vulcan statue at the center of Vulcan Park, Birmingham, Alabama

The McWane family and company are known for their charitable work in Alabama and in communities where the company's plants are located. The family pledged $10 million to help fund the McWane Science Center in 1998, and they have donated to cultural institutions such as the Birmingham Civil Rights Institute. The company also offers undergraduate scholarships to Alabama college students. The McWane family donated $2 million towards the 1999 restoration of Birmingham's famous Vulcan statue, which was originally cast in 1904 by J. R. McWane's foundry and is the largest cast iron statue in the world. The Alabama Chapter of the Association of Fundraising Professionals awarded Phillip McWane its Outstanding Corporate Citizen of the Year Award in 2005.

The city of Birmingham has also recognized McWane several times for its beautification and summer arts programs. In 2009, the McWane Foundation pledged $5 million to Alabama's Children's Hospital for the construction of an environmentally friendly hospital. In addition to the gift from the McWane Foundation, Phillip and Heather McWane personally pledged an additional $5 million for a clinical program in the new hospital. In 2024, Will McWane and his wife, Kaitlyn, along with the McWane family, committed a lead donation of $4 million to anchor the development of the state-of-the-art Junior Achievement McWane Economic Education Center in Birmingham, Alabama.

In 2025, Phillip McWane kick-started the Jimmie Hale Mission’s Lasting Transformation Capital Campaign in Birmingham by providing $2 million toward the Shepura Men’s Center dormitory renovation. In addition, the Amerex Miracle Field, an inclusive sports facility, was made possible through a $500,000 donation from Amerex Corporation and its parent McWane, Inc., in partnership with the city of Trussville.

Outside of Alabama, McWane's subsidiaries have contributed to charitable causes and community resources, including a $30,000 donation to the Community Health and Mahaska Hospice for the renovation of the former Family Medical Center building, now called the Mahaska Health West building by the Clow Valve Company. In 2008, the Atlantic States Cast Iron Pipe Co. donated $75,000 to upgrade the Walters Park band shell in Phillipsburg, New Jersey.

According to Federal Election Commission data, McWane Inc. was the top contributor to then-Senator Jeff Sessions' campaign committee from 2011 to 2016.

In 2023, McWane Ductile – Ohio donated $500,000 toward the McWane River Walk project, a multi-use path in Coshocton, Ohio, in partnership with Coshocton County. Also during that year, McWane Ductile made a $1 million donation to the Cal Ripke, Sr. Foundation to help build a youth development park, McWane Field, at Waters Park in Phillipsburg, New Jersey. In 2025, Clow Canada and McWane, Inc., donated $1.1 million to the nonprofit Romero House in Saint John, New Brunswick, Canada, for an expansion project. Kennedy Valve contributed $1.5 million to help develop the Chemung Canal Connector Trail in Elmira Heights, New York.

== See also ==
- Birmingham District
- Cast iron
- Cast-iron architecture
- Foundry
