= Airport crash tender =

Emergency vehicle specialised in aircraft firefighting operations

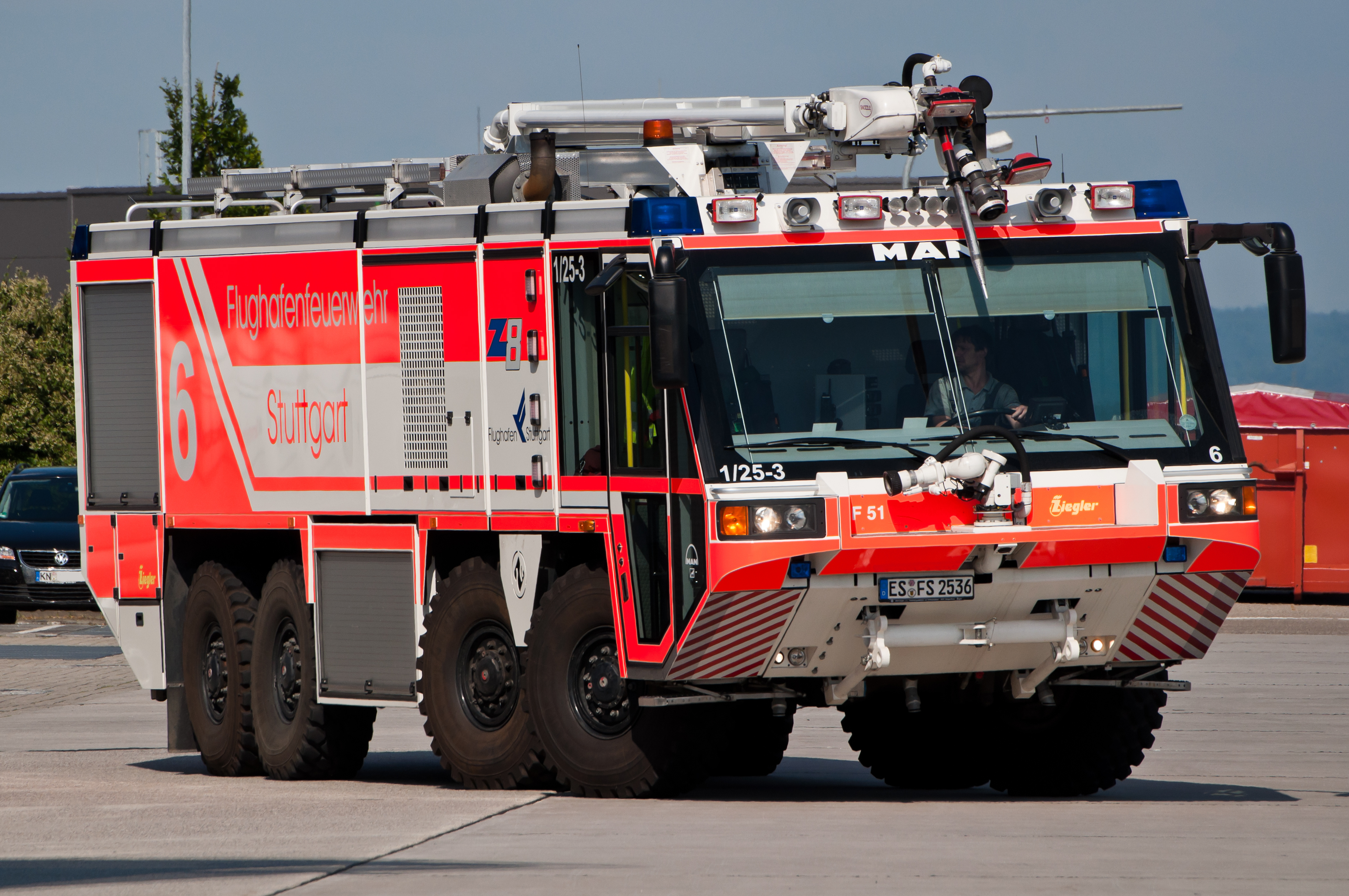
MAN/Ziegler airport crash tender belonging to the fire brigade of Stuttgart Airport

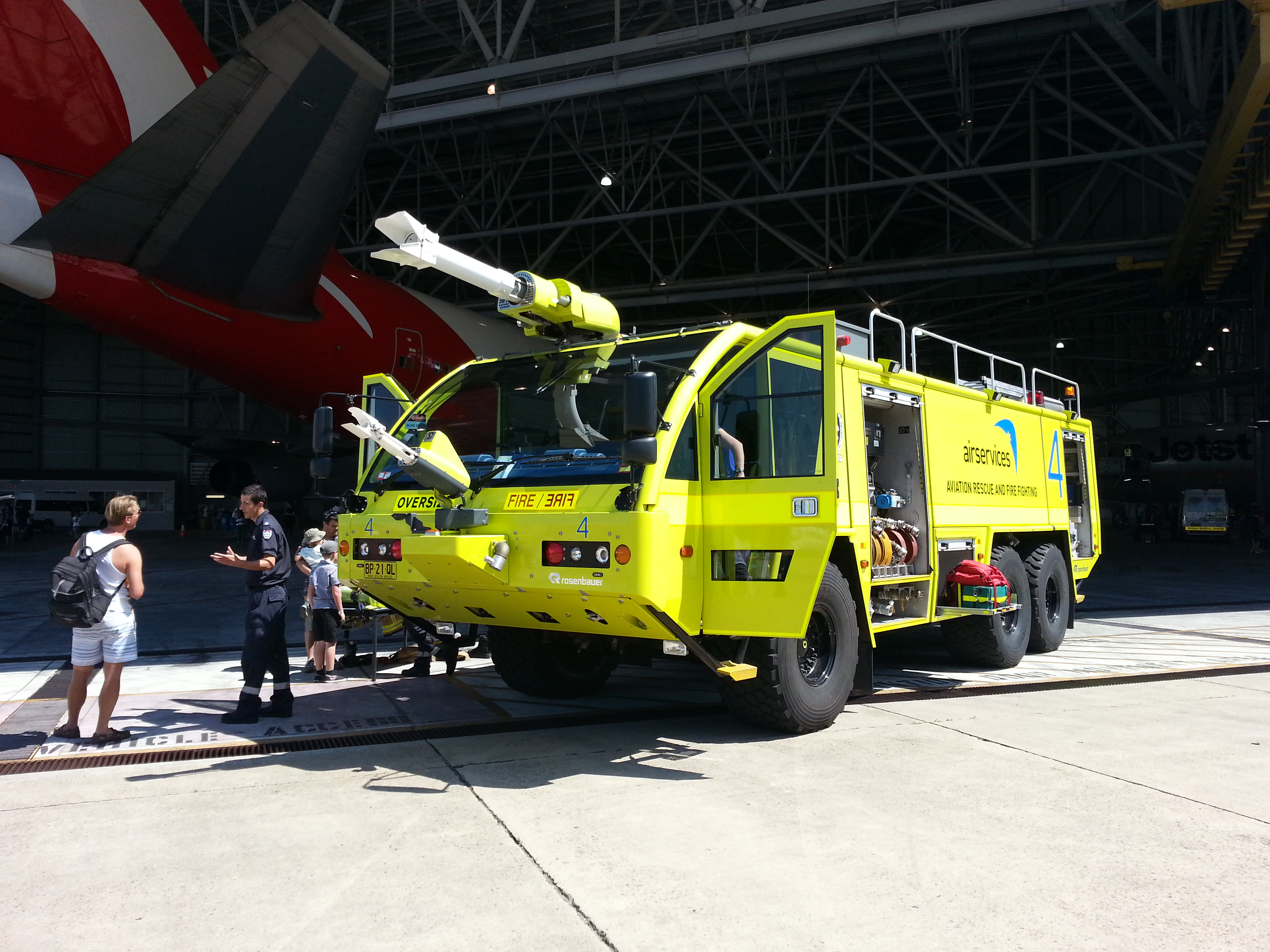
Rosenbauer Mk8 ultra-large airport crash tender, Airservices Australia

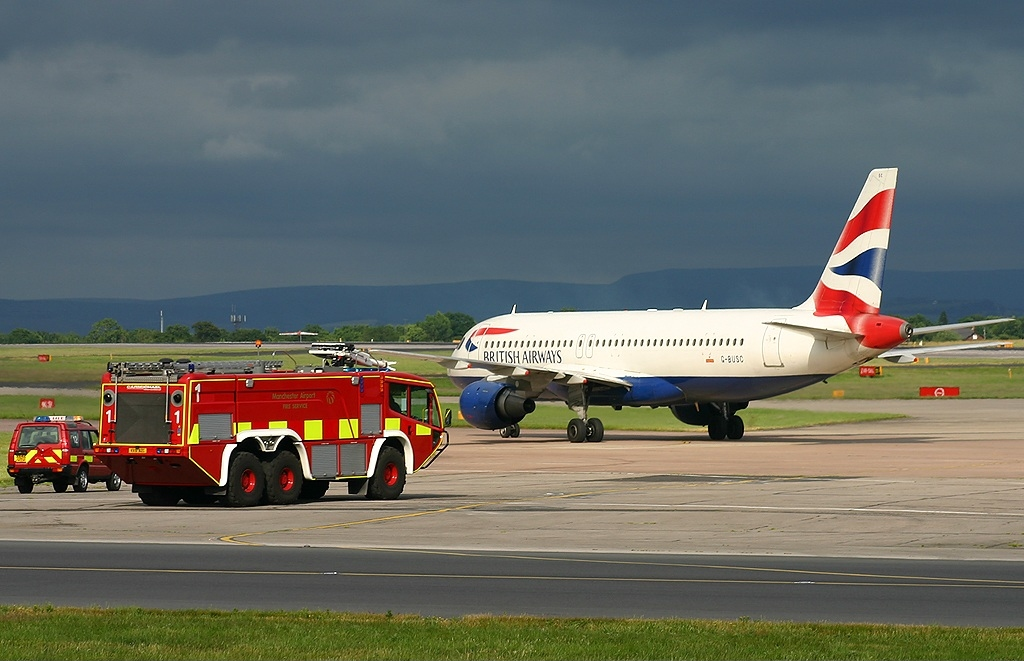
Airport crash tender at Manchester Ringway Int'l Airport

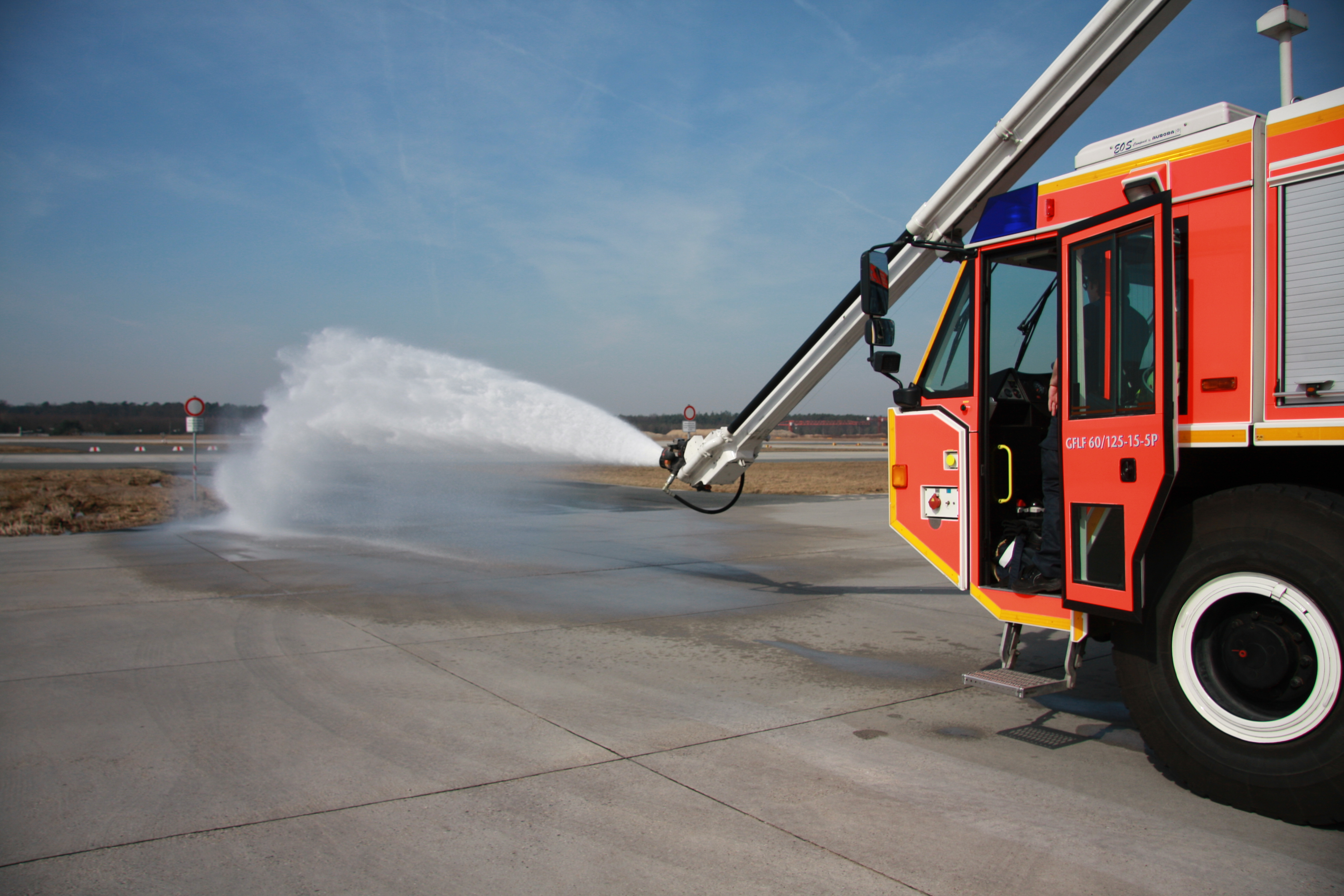
A Rosenbauer Simba 8x8 HRET at Frankfurt Airport in action

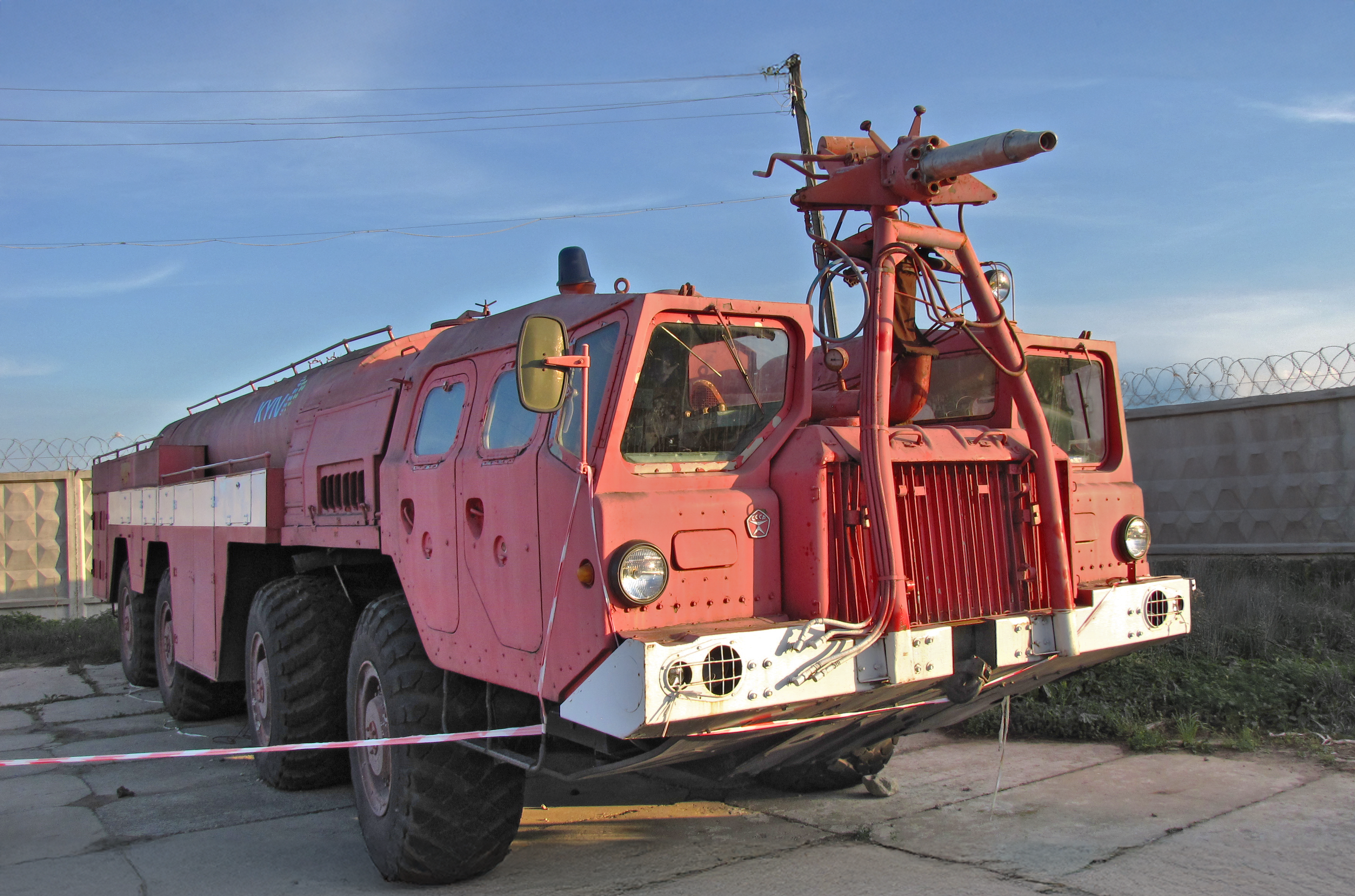
Soviet airport crash tender АА-60 at Ukraine State Aviation Museum

An airport crash tender (known in some countries as an airport fire appliance) is a specialised fire engine designed for use in aircraft firefighting at aerodromes, airports, and military air bases.

== Description ==
Airport crash tenders offer relatively good acceleration for their size and weight, are able to negotiate rough terrain outside the airport area, carry large capacities of water and fire fighting foam, are fitted with powerful high-capacity pumps and water/foam cannons, and are capable of delivering firefighting media over long distances. They can be mounted on 4x4, 6x6, or even 8x8 wheeled chassis. In order to decrease their turning radius, all four of the 8x8 wheeled unit's front wheels may be steerable.

Newer airport crash tenders also incorporate twin-agent nozzles/injection systems to inject a stream of Purple-K dry chemical into the AFFF firefighting foam stream, helping to extinguish the fire faster. Some also have Halotron tanks with handlines for situations that require a clean agent to be utilized. These features allow airport crash tenders to reach an aircraft quickly, and rapidly put out large fires with jet fuel involved.

Some tenders have an elevated extended extinguishing arm capable of raising a water/foam cannon up to about 10–20 m (33–66 ft). Some can then puncture superficial structures of an aeroplane to fight a fire inside the fuselage. Such a reinforced nozzle (snozzle) is, according to the United States National Transportation Safety Board, a "piercing nozzle on the fire truck that is used to penetrate an airplane's fuselage and dispense AFFF to extinguish fire inside the cabin or cargo area."

== Standards ==
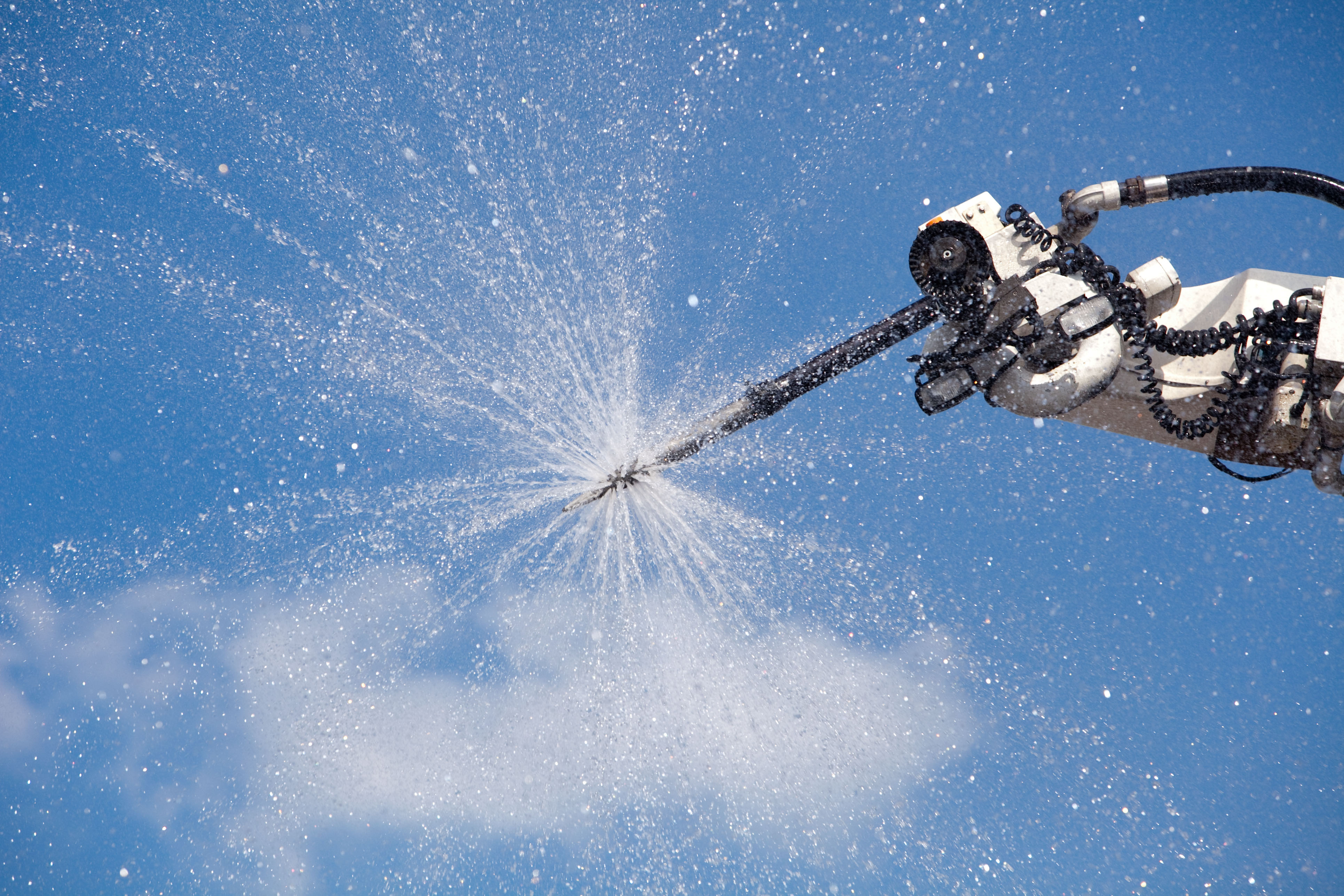
Spray nozzle in use on airport crash tender

The International Civil Aviation Organization (ICAO) has given standards and recommended practices on rescue fire fighting categories of civil aerodromes. National aviation authorities may have given even further requirements on aerodrome rescue and fire services.

The rescue fire services are based on a critical aircraft size based on a statistical analysis of movements (take-offs and landings) on the airport. The aerodrome category is based on the size of the largest aircraft which will operate at the aerodrome; however, if the frequency of movements of aircraft in the critical size category is below a certain threshold (specified in the standard), the aerodrome category can be reduced compared to what would otherwise have been required (for example, at an airport regularly handling Boeing 737 and Airbus A320 aircraft with a single Boeing 777 service per week, the airport fire service has to cater up to the ICAO category 7 of the 737 and A320, as a single 777 movement per week does not justify a full ICAO category 9 fire service). There are also minimum category levels based on e.g. the number of seats in the critical aircraft.

Depending on the airport category, the standards determine the minimum number of rescue fire-fighting vehicles. In addition, requirements are given on the water and foam capacities, discharge rates for foam solutions, and minimum dry chemical powder (complementary agent) amounts, reserve stocks of fire fighting agents, ability to operate on rough terrain, and acceleration of the air crash tenders. The end of each runway has to be reached in a response time of two minutes or less, and any part of the movement area has to be achieved in a response time not exceeding three minutes.

== Range of airport firefighting vehicles ==
Airport rescue and firefighting services operate many specialist vehicles to provide emergency cover at airports. They include:

1. Crash tenders (as described above)
2. "Domestic" type fire appliances. Domestic appliances are similar in function and appearance to fire appliances operated by local fire services. They are not as large or as heavy as airport crash tenders. The units are ordinarily used to respond to fire incidents in airport terminal buildings but also respond to aircraft incidents. The appliances carry breathing apparatus, rescue equipment, firefighting media, ladders, cutting equipment, etc.
3. "First attack" or "rapid intervention vehicles" (RIV). RIVs are normally smaller, nimble fire appliances capable of quick acceleration and high speed. They carry less equipment than domestic appliances and crash tenders but arrive first on scene at aircraft incidents to begin rescue and firefighting operations whilst heavier and larger units approach.
4. General purpose vehicles (such as a fire chief's car or general purpose or incident support vehicles).

== See also ==
- Rosenbauer Panther
- Oshkosh Striker
- Water salute
