= American Cast Iron Pipe Company =

American manufacturing company

- Company type: Private company
- Industry: Manufacturing
- Founded: 1905
- Headquarters: Birmingham, Alabama, USA
- Key people: Van L. Richey, President & CEO
- Products: ductile iron pipe, spiral-welded steel pipe, fire hydrants, valves, fire pumps, steel pipe, static castings
- Revenue: ▲$1.8 billion USD (2023)
- Number of employees: 3,000 (2010)
- Website: american-usa.com

American Cast Iron Pipe Company is a manufacturer of ductile iron pipe, spiral-welded steel pipe, fire hydrants, and valves for the waterworks industry, and electric-resistance-welded steel pipe for the oil and natural gas industry. Headquartered in Birmingham, Alabama, American's diversified product line also includes static castings and high performance fire pumps.

== History ==
American was founded by Charlotte and James Blair. They recruited the initial investors, including John J. Eagan, who was the company's first president and later sole proprietor. In 1924, Eagan died of complications from tuberculosis. Upon his death, having previously acquired all of the stock of the company, he willed ownership of the company in a trust to its employees.

In the 1920s, American developed a proprietary Mono-Cast centrifugal casting method and increased pipe diameters to 24 inches (610 mm). The company also introduced cement-lined pipe, which became the industry standard. The Wall Street crash of 1929 had little effect on the company at first, but soon, business started to decline resulting in a loss of jobs. By the mid-1930s, government spending on municipal water supplies, fire protection, and sanitation brought a resurgence in business.

In 1939, business was further boosted by federal defense spending to support World War II. When the country entered the war, American began manufacturing steel parts for ships, planes, and tanks, which led to the creation of a new Special Products Division for steel products.

In 1955, American shipped its first large order of ductile iron pipe. A new melting system in 1972, including the largest cupola of its kind in the world, would supply the new iron for this pipe, and American would move from a Sand Spun casting process to a generation of deLavaud metal molds, still used today. Throughout the 1960s, American would continue to diversify, adding its valves and hydrants product line and gaskets.

In the early 1980s American expanded its steel pipe business and acquired Waterous Company of St. Paul, Minnesota, to add fire pumps to its product line and increase market share in valves and hydrants.

In 2000, American opened American SpiralWeld Pipe Company in Columbia, South Carolina, diversifying its product line to include spiral-welded steel pipe in diameters up to 144 inches (3,700 mm). In 2015, American began operations at a new spiral-welded pipe production facility in Flint, Michigan. A third facility opened in Paris, Texas, in 2021.

Its Steel Pipe Division would also see major developments. In 2015, American Steel Pipe completed a $70-million expansion, including a new 150,000-square-foot processing facility and upgrades to its two mills.

== Divisions ==
ACIPCO has divisions for Steel Pipe, Ductile Iron Pipe (both based in Birmingham), Flow Control (valve- and hydrant-producing facilities in Beaumont, Texas, and South St. Paul, Minnesota), Spiral-Weld Pipe (in Columbia, South Carolina; Flint, Michigan; and Paris, Texas), and Castings (in Pryor, Oklahoma).
