= Amerex =

American manufacturer of firefighting products

Amerex Corporation
- Type: Subsidiary
- Industry: Fire protection
- Founded: 1971; 55 years ago
- Founder: Ned Paine; George Baureis
- Headquarters: Trussville, Alabama, U.S.
- Key people: Harrison Bishop (president)
- Products: Fire extinguishers, fire alarms, gas detectors
- Number of employees: 500 (2011)
- Parent: McWane, Inc.
- Website: www.amerex-fire.com

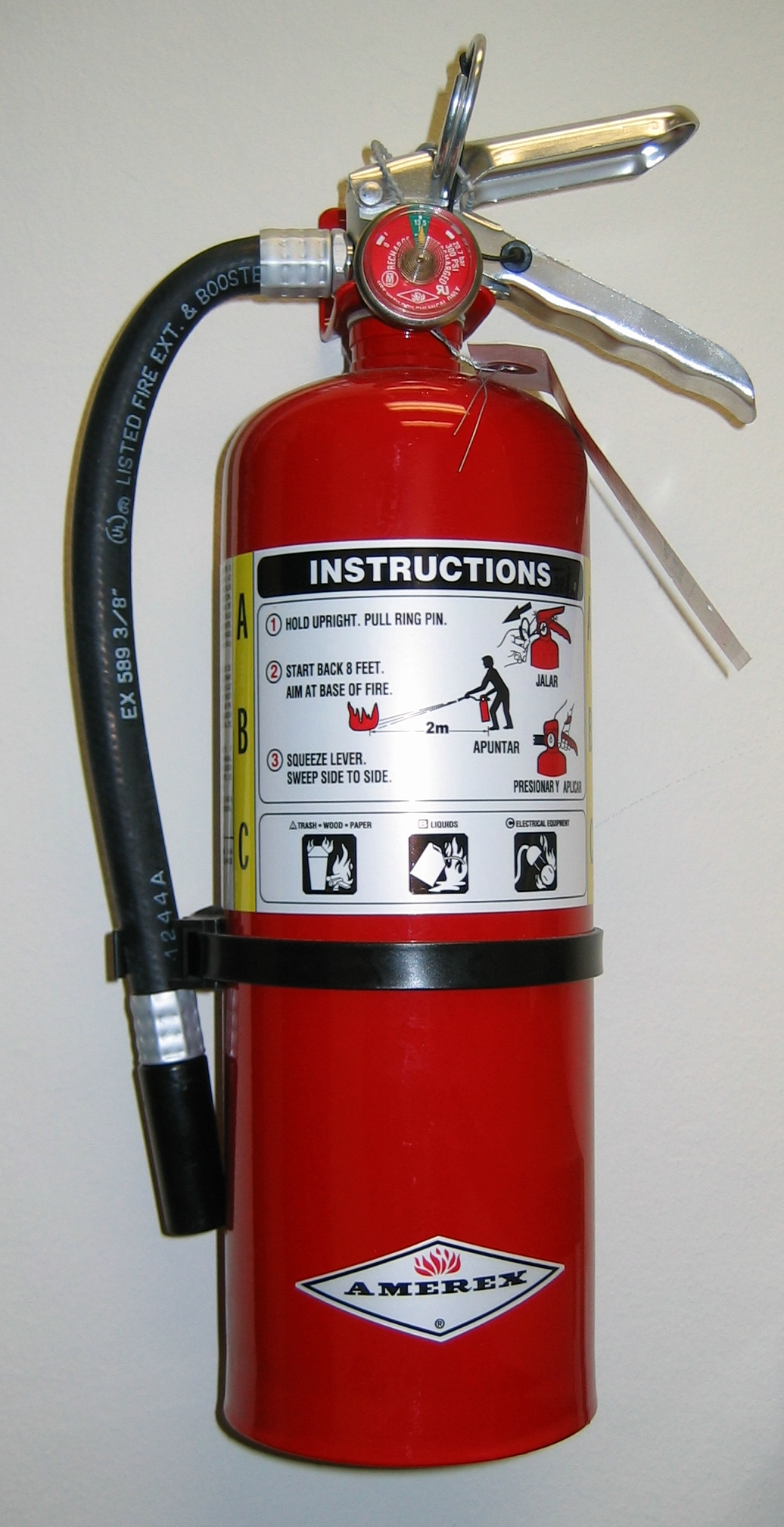
A typical Amerex fire extinguisher

Amerex Corporation is a large American manufacturer of firefighting products. Based in Trussville, Alabama, Amerex makes hand-portable and wheeled fire extinguishers for commercial and industrial environments, as well as fire and explosion suppression vehicle systems for military use. Other products include fire suppression systems for restaurants, gas detection systems, and fire detection devices. McWane, Inc. acquired Amerex in 1999.

== History ==
Amerex was founded in 1971 by Ned Paine and George Baureis. During his service in the European theatre in World War II, Ned Paine conceived the idea for the modern fire extinguisher following a notable incident. While dining with fellow soldiers around an open fire, adjacent flammable materials caught fire. In response, Paine used a readily available powdery substance, applying it in a manner similar to the use of baking soda for extinguishing grease fires. The material successfully suppressed the flames, as it was a chemical compound capable of displacing oxygen and thereby starving the fire. Subsequently, Paine designed and developed the first fire extinguisher utilizing this principle, inventing a system to contain the chemical under pressure and discharge it effectively onto fires. Paine was part of the Amerex team until his retirement in September 1999. He sold the company to McWane, Inc. the same year.

In 2010, Amerex began emerging as a major military subcontractor after developing a fire suppression system being deployed on American military vehicles often targeted by mines and homemade bombs in the Middle East. The company is a subcontractor of the Oshkosh Corporation, a maker of military vehicles. The vehicles use safety equipment, including fire suppression gear, made by Amerex for Oshkosh vehicles. Optical sensors are used to detect fires and explosions instantly, which then directs a series of jets and hoses to put out the fire with a concealed substance.

In 2011, Amerex acquired The Solberg Company, another firefighting equipment company based in Bergen, Norway.

According to former Amerex President Bill Beyer, the fire extinguisher sales tend to follow the general economy and growth in new buildings.

Amerex produces 2.5 million commercial and industrial fire extinguishers each year.
