= Rosenbauer =

Austrian firefighting equipment manufacturer

Rosenbauer International AG
- Type: Aktiengesellschaft
- Industry: Trucks and other vehicles
- Founded: 1866
- Headquarters: Leonding, Upper Austria, Austria
- Key people: Robert Ottel (CEO)
- Products: Fire and rescue vehicles, firefighting equipment
- Revenue: ▲€1.065 billion (2023)
- Operating income: ▲€12.9 million (2023)
- Net income: ▲€1.1 million (2023)
- Total assets: ▼€261.9 million (2023)
- Total equity: ▲€1.166 billion (2023)
- Number of employees: ▲4,922 (2025)
- Website: www.rosenbauer.com

The Rosenbauer Group is the world’s third largest manufacturers of fire-service vehicles and firefighting equipment, based in Leonding, Austria.

Rosenbauer supplies the fire fighting sector in over 100 countries with a wide range of custom fire and rescue apparatus and services. It produces its extensive series of fire fighting vehicles and aerials in three continents, to both European and US standards.

== History ==
=== Founding and development ===
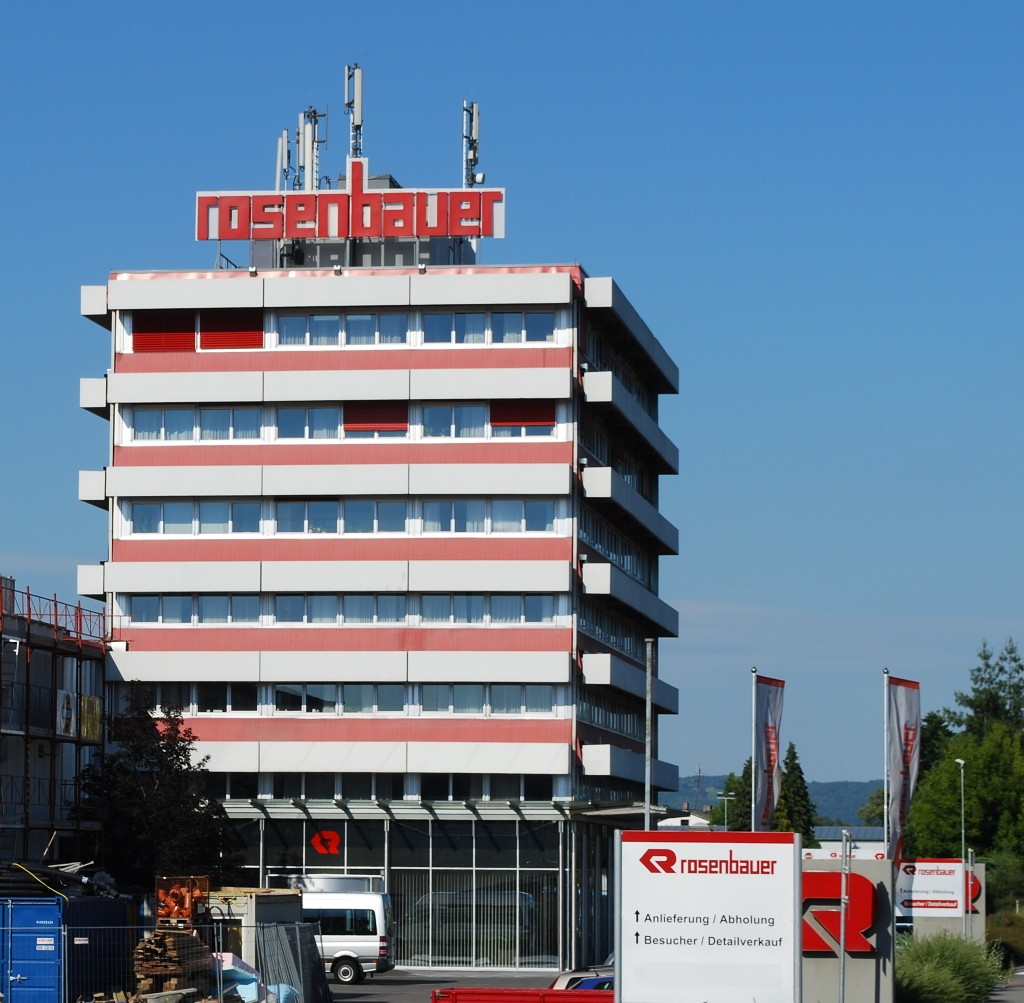
Headquarters in Leonding, Austria

The first Austria-wide firefighting enterprise was founded by Johann Rosenbauer in Linz in 1866. Beside manual fire pumps from different manufacturers, helmets, buttons and so on, the company was also selling equipment for fencing, sports and playgrounds. Konrad Rosenbauer took over the company in 1888, a turning point from which it would manufacture its own fire extinguishing equipment. After moving to a larger site, the company traded its name for K. Rosenbauer & Kneitschel, Fabrik für Lösch- und Wehrgerät und Metallwaren.

In 1908, Rosenbauer started producing gas-powered pumps. The first fire truck was built 1918. In 1926, the new Automobilspritzengesellschaft Lohner & Rosenbauer shipped its first vehicle to China. From 1930 onward, Rosenbauer was also able to produce its own two-stroke engines (today, engines are provided by others, notably BMW and Volkswagen).

The company had a production site in Iran, until the fall of the Shah.

Since the 1970s, Rosenbauer has collaborated with Carvatech, for the manufacture of firefighting vehicle bodies.

In the middle of the 1980s, Rosenbauer introduced the Falcon, a vehicle which had a chassis developed especially for firefighting vehicles. The Falcon, with many custom and unproven parts, was prone to failures and long down-time, dooming custom chassis apparatuses to failure in Europe.

=== Recent times ===
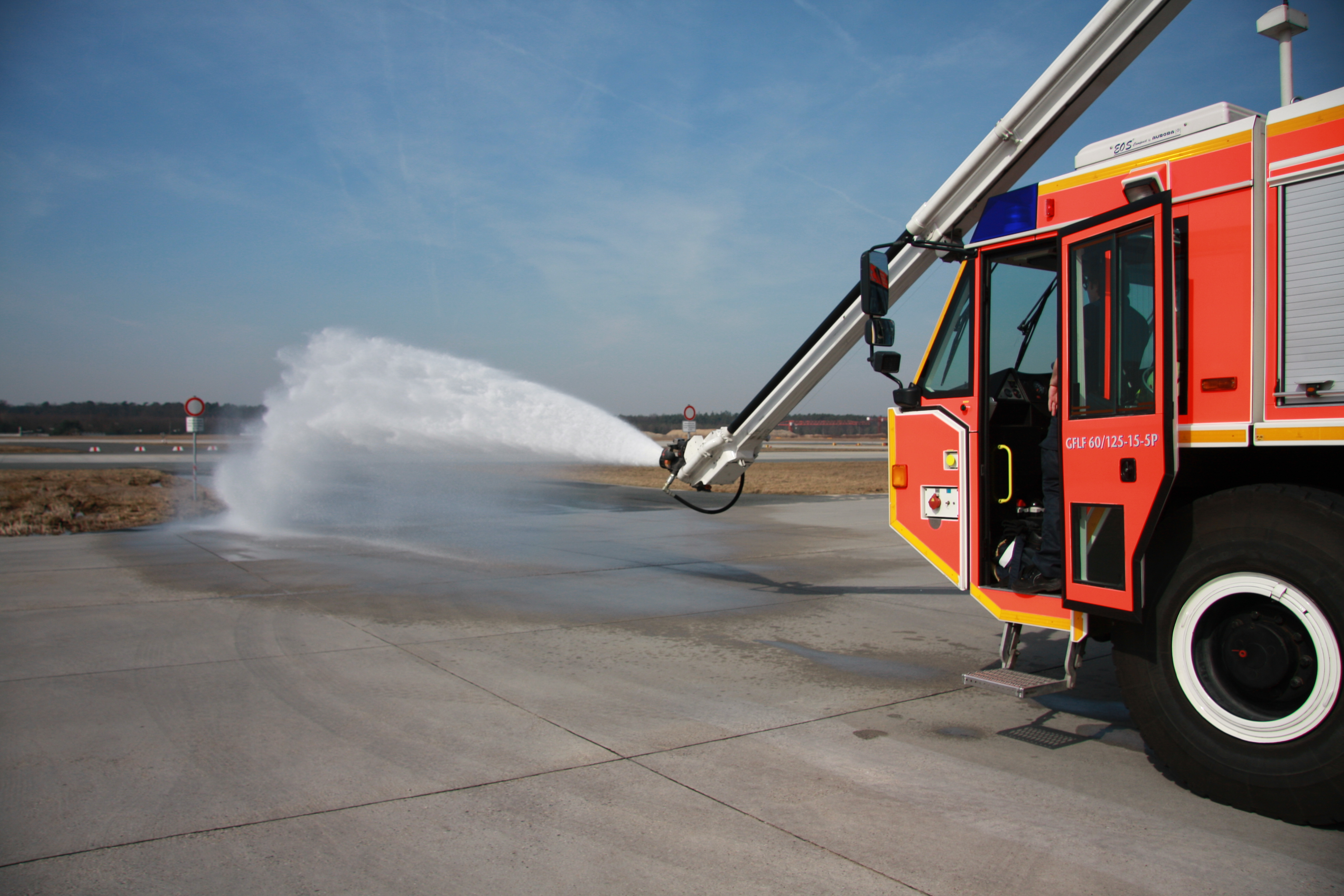
A Rosenbauer Simba 8x8 HRET belonging to the Aircraft Rescue and Firefighting at Frankfurt Airport in action

Rosenbauer International AG has been listed on the Vienna Stock Exchange since 1994.

2010, Rosenbauer had over 2,000 employees worldwide and turnover was about €595 million. Over 90% of the production is exported and the company has sites in Luckenwalde, Passau, Karlsruhe, Oberglatt (Switzerland), Madrid, Lyons (Sioux Falls, South Dakota), Wyoming (Minneapolis, Minnesota) and Singapore.

The company has expanded activities to flying firefighting vehicles, water cannons for police forces and has come back on the firefighters fittings (uniforms, helmets...).

Beginning of 2011, German antitrust authorities sentenced Rosenbauer, Schlingmann GmbH & Co. KG, Albert Ziegler GmbH & Co. KG and Iveco Magirus Brandschutztechnik GmbH to a total of €28 million fines for cartel practices.

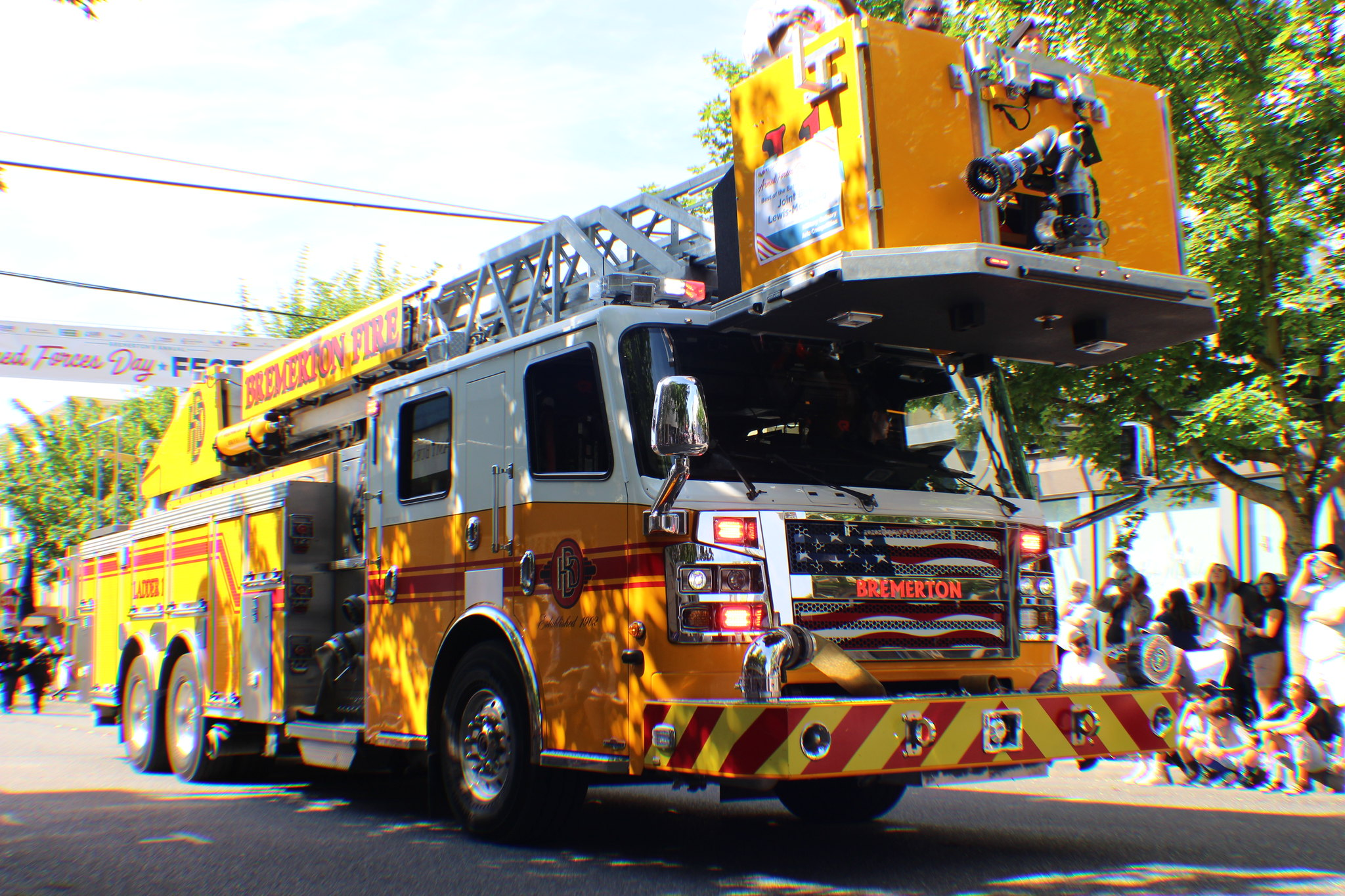
A 2018 Rosenbauer Commander, an American-style fire apparatus, in Bremerton, Washington, U.S.

The Rosenbauer RT, for Revolutionary Technology, was an electric vehicle built in 2014 in Austria as a concept model. As of 2023, the electric trucks had been introduced in Berlin, Amsterdam, Dubai and Vancouver, BC. The electric truck that was stationed in Amsterdam was around the end of November 2024 transferred to the Fire department located in Tiel for further testing. Vice president of sales and marketing Mark Fusco said the company would start building them in its Minnesota plant in 2023. The BMW diesel engine was used only to charge the batteries. The truck was closer to the ground, making it safer and easier for firefighters to enter and exit, though a hydraulic suspension could lift the truck if it was needed. Fusco estimated the cost at $1.1 to $1.2 million but claimed savings on fuel and maintenance would make up for the extra cost in three to five years.

== Products ==
=== BEST System ===
Rosenbauer's Battery Extinguishing System Technology (BEST) was designed to safely and effectively combat fires involving electric vehicles with lithium-ion technology. The two-part system is connected by a hose and has a control unit and a piercing unit which is designed to shoot through the bottom of the battery pack.

== Shareholders ==
As of July 2011, 51% of the company belongs to the Rosenbauer Beteiligungsverwaltungs GmbH, 5% to institutional investors and the remaining 44% is free float.

In early March 2025, Robau Beteiligungsverwaltung GmbH completed a majority takeover of Rosenbauer, holding 57.63% of shares.

== See also ==
- Rosenbauer Panther
- Rosenbauer Simba
