= Fire engine =

Emergency vehicle intended to put out fires

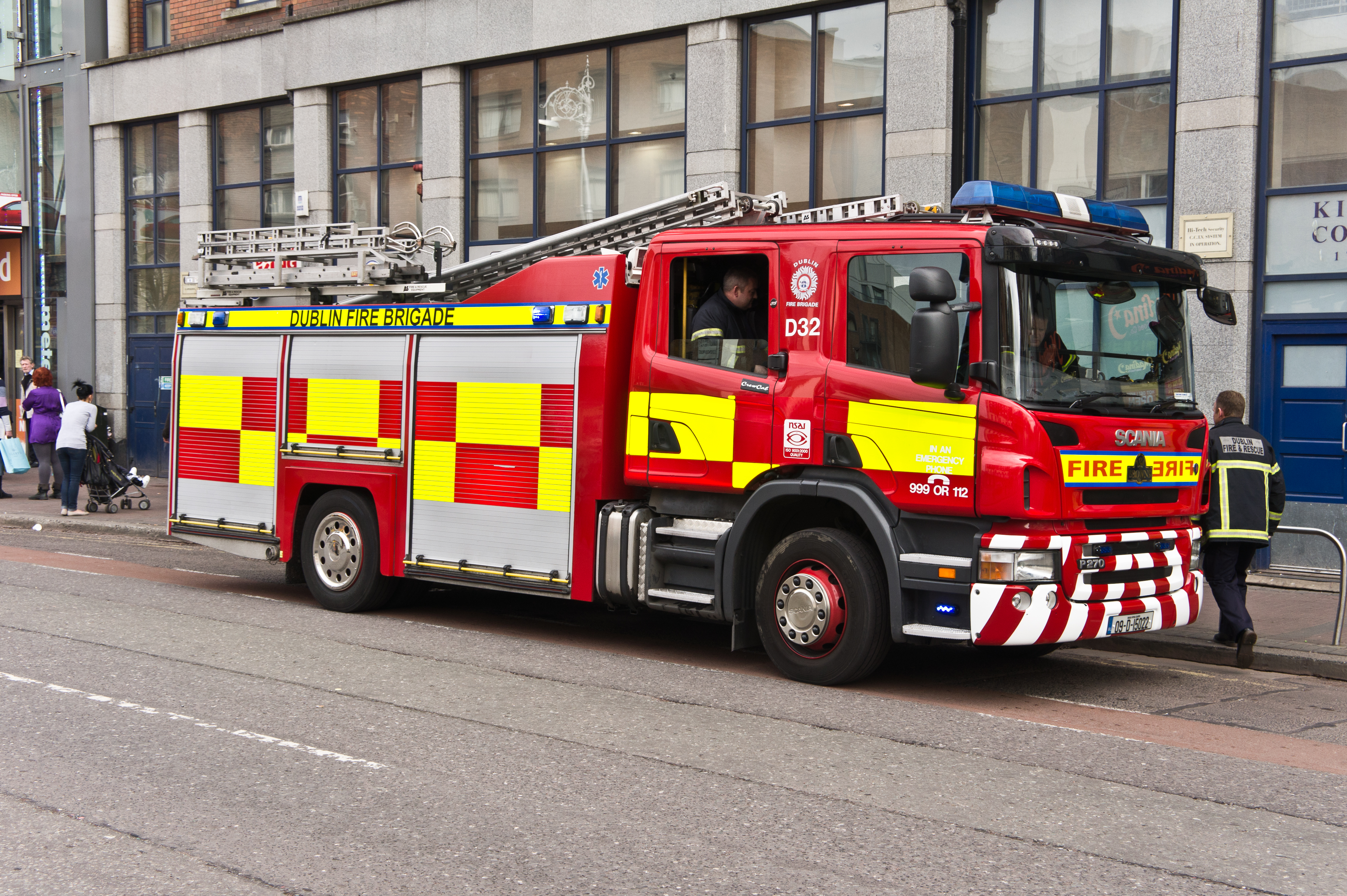
A Scania P270 fire engine used by Dublin Fire Brigade in Ireland

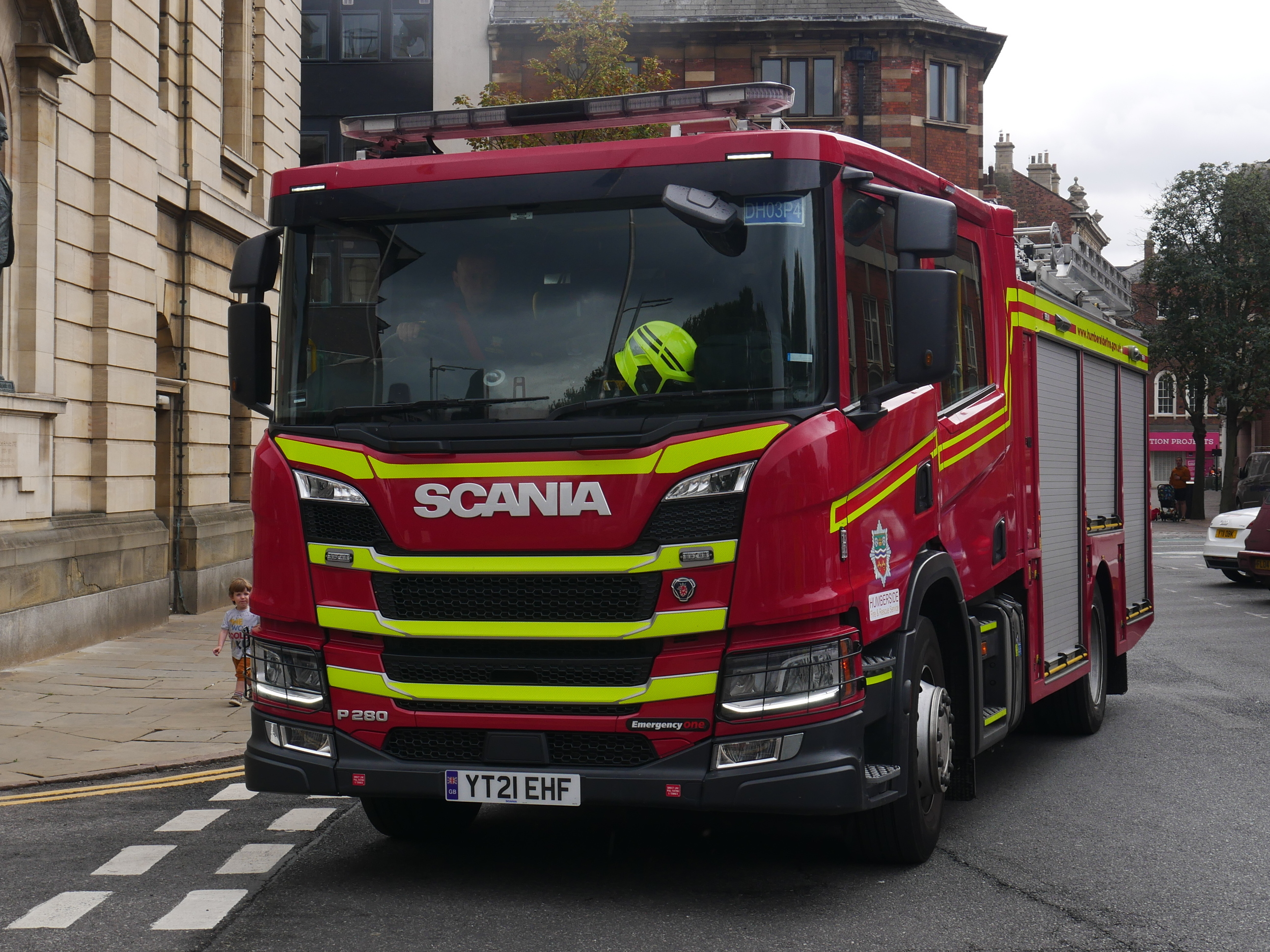
A Scania P280 fire engine used by the Humberside Fire and Rescue Service in England

A fire engine (or fire truck, also spelled firetruck) is a vehicle, usually a specially designed or modified truck, that functions as a firefighting apparatus. The primary purposes of a fire engine include transporting firefighters and water to an incident as well as carrying equipment for firefighting operations in a fire drill. Some fire engines have specialized functions, such as wildfire suppression and aircraft rescue and firefighting, and may also carry equipment for technical rescue.

Many fire engines are based on a commercial vehicle chassis that is further upgraded and customized for firefighting requirements. They are generally considered emergency vehicles authorized to be equipped with emergency lights and sirens, as well as communication equipment such as two-way radios and mobile computer technology.

The terms fire engine and fire truck depend primarily on geography and dialect - 'fire engine' in British and Irish English and in Commonwealth countries, and 'fire truck' in North America), but can used interchangeably depending on the choice of a broad range of vehicles involved in firefighting; however, in some fire departments they refer to separate and specific types of vehicle.

== Design and construction ==
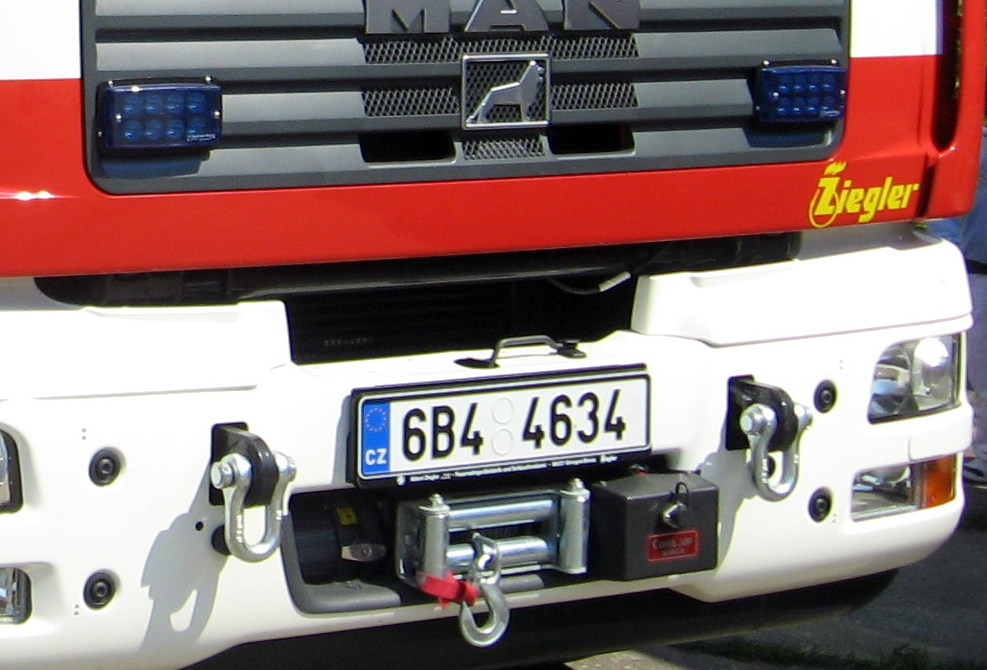
Front of a MAN fire engine with built-in winch, e.g. for towing damaged cars. The shackles serve a similar purpose.

The design and construction of fire engines focuses greatly on the use of both active and passive warnings. Passive visual warnings involve the use of high contrast patterns to increase the noticeability of the vehicle. They are more common on older vehicles or those in developing countries. Modern vehicles in developed countries use retroreflectors to create designs or display words such as "fire" or "rescue". European countries commonly use a pattern known as Battenburg markings. Along with the passive warnings, are active visual warnings which are usually in the form of flashing colored lights (also known as "beacons" or "lightbars"). These flash to attract the attention of other drivers as the fire truck approaches, or to provide warning to drivers approaching a parked fire truck in a dangerous position on the road. While the fire truck is headed towards the scene, the lights are always accompanied by warning sound alarms such as sirens and air horns. Some fire engines in the United States are lime yellow rather than red due to safety and ergonomics reasons. A 2009 study by the U.S. Fire Administration concluded that fluorescent colors, including yellow-green and orange, are easiest to spot in daylight.

In some regions, a fire engine may be used to transport first responder firefighters, paramedics or EMTs to medical emergencies due to their proximity to the incident.

== Types ==
=== Conventional fire engine ===
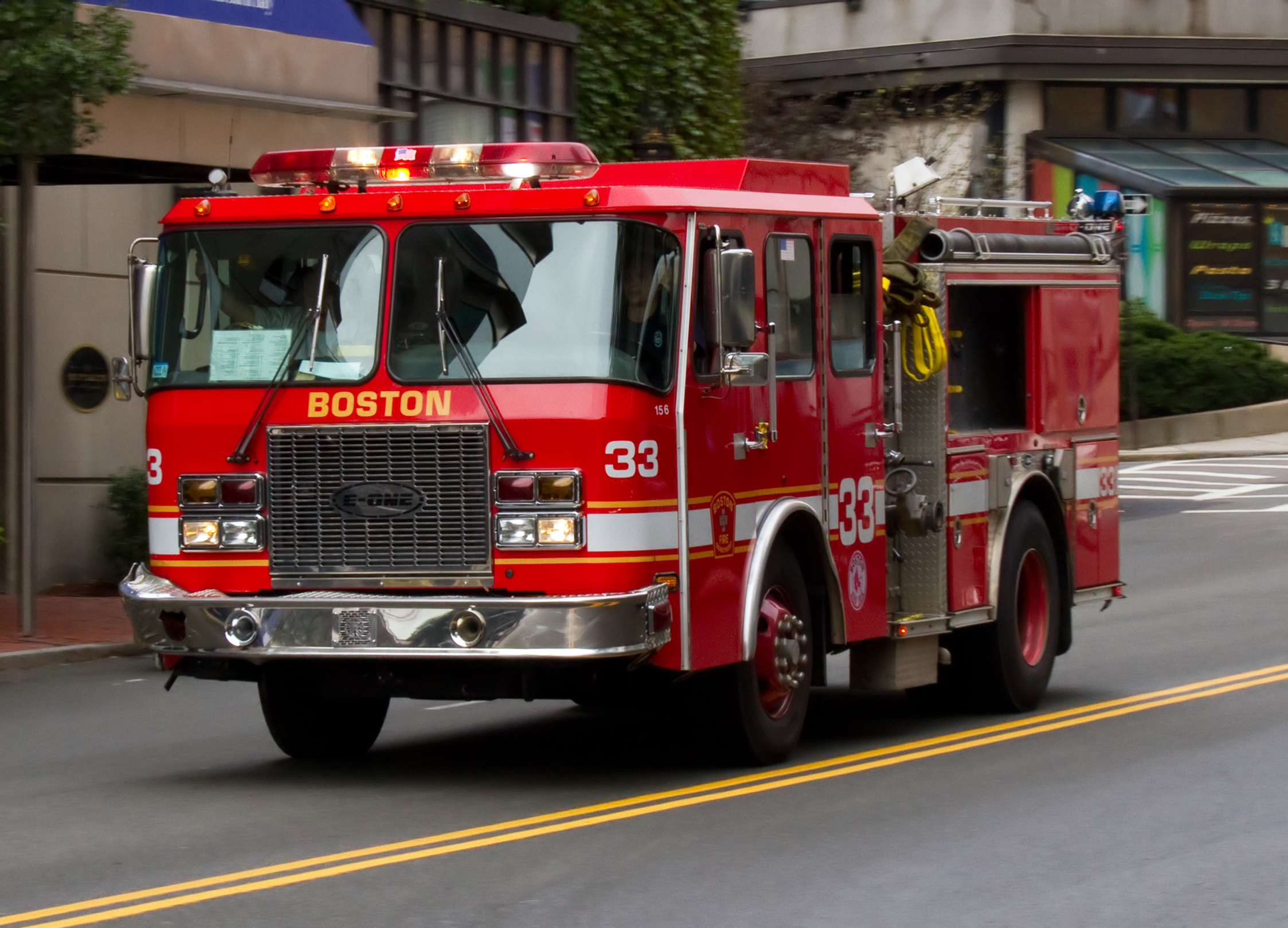
An E-One engine used by the Boston Fire Department

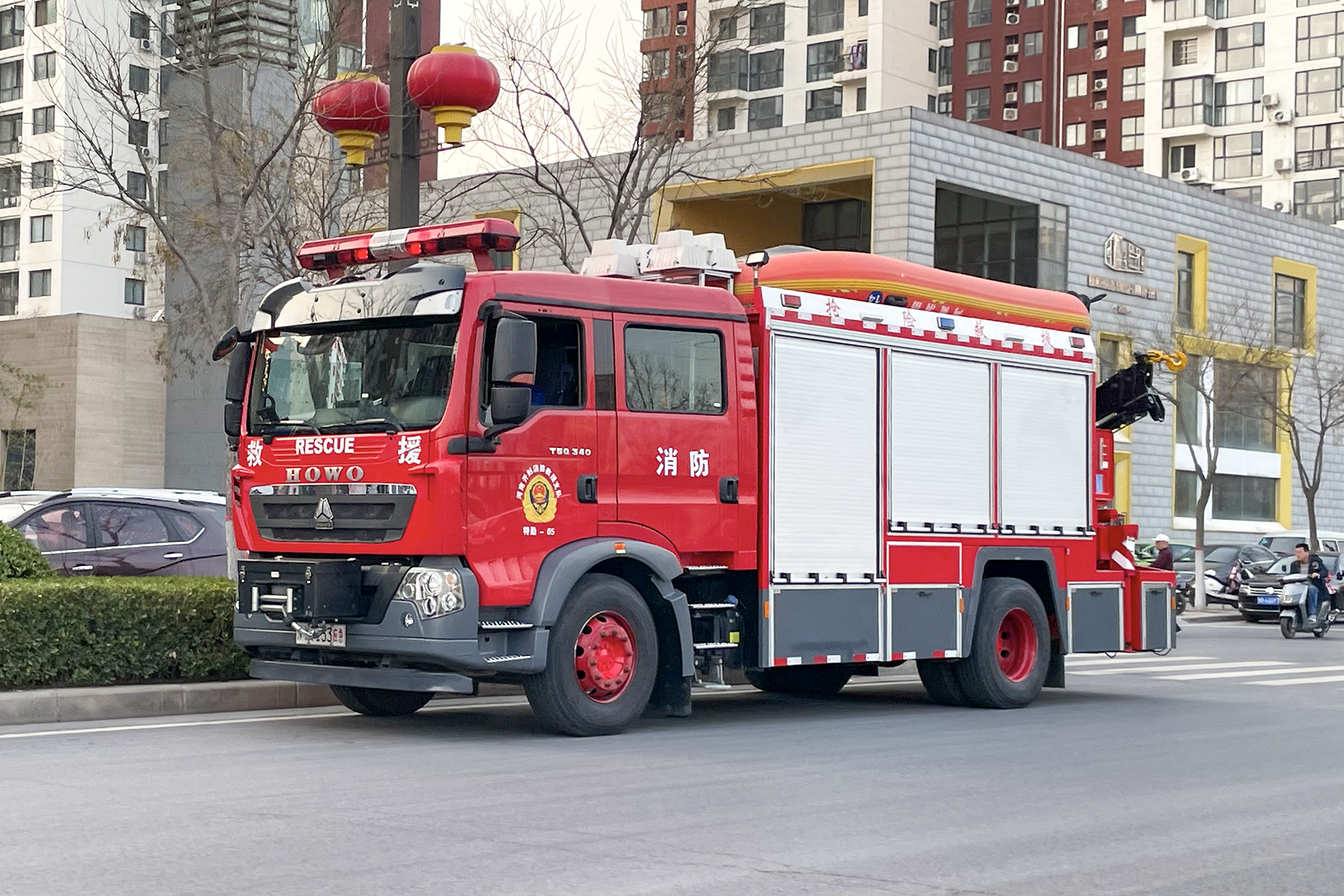
A Howo engine used by the Henan Fire Rescue Corps

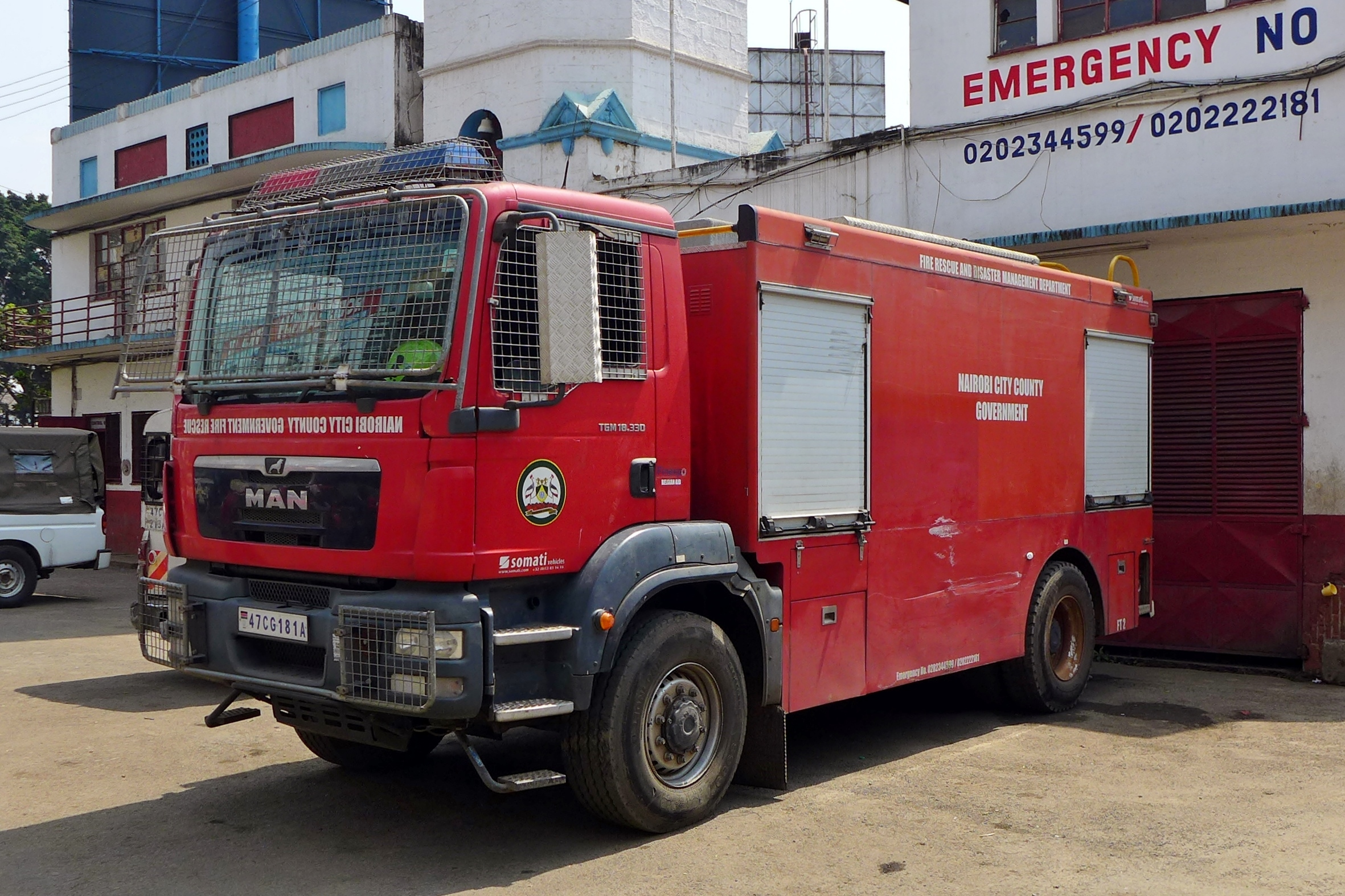
An MAN engine used by the Nairobi Fire Service

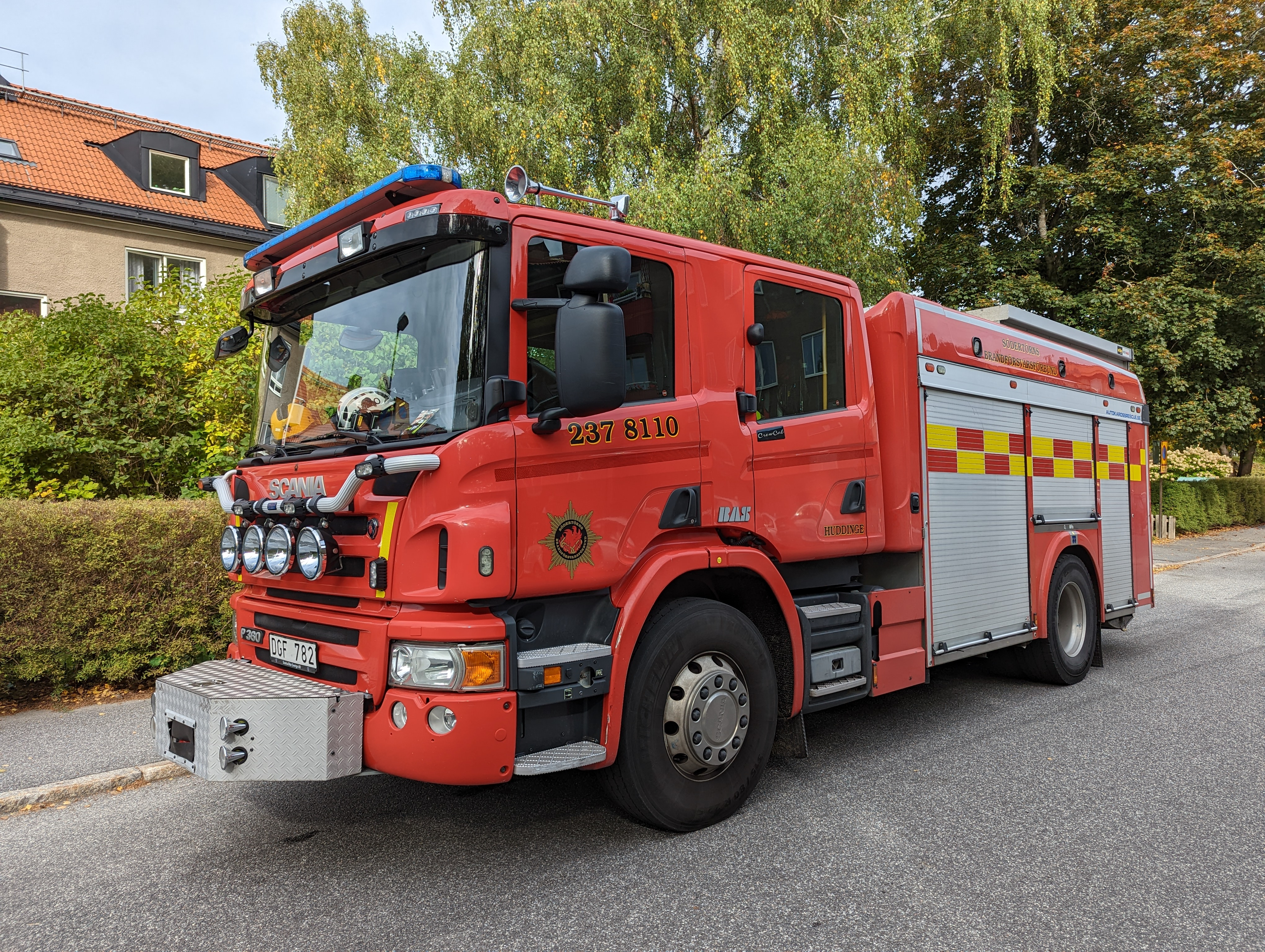
A Scania engine used by the Södertörn fire service

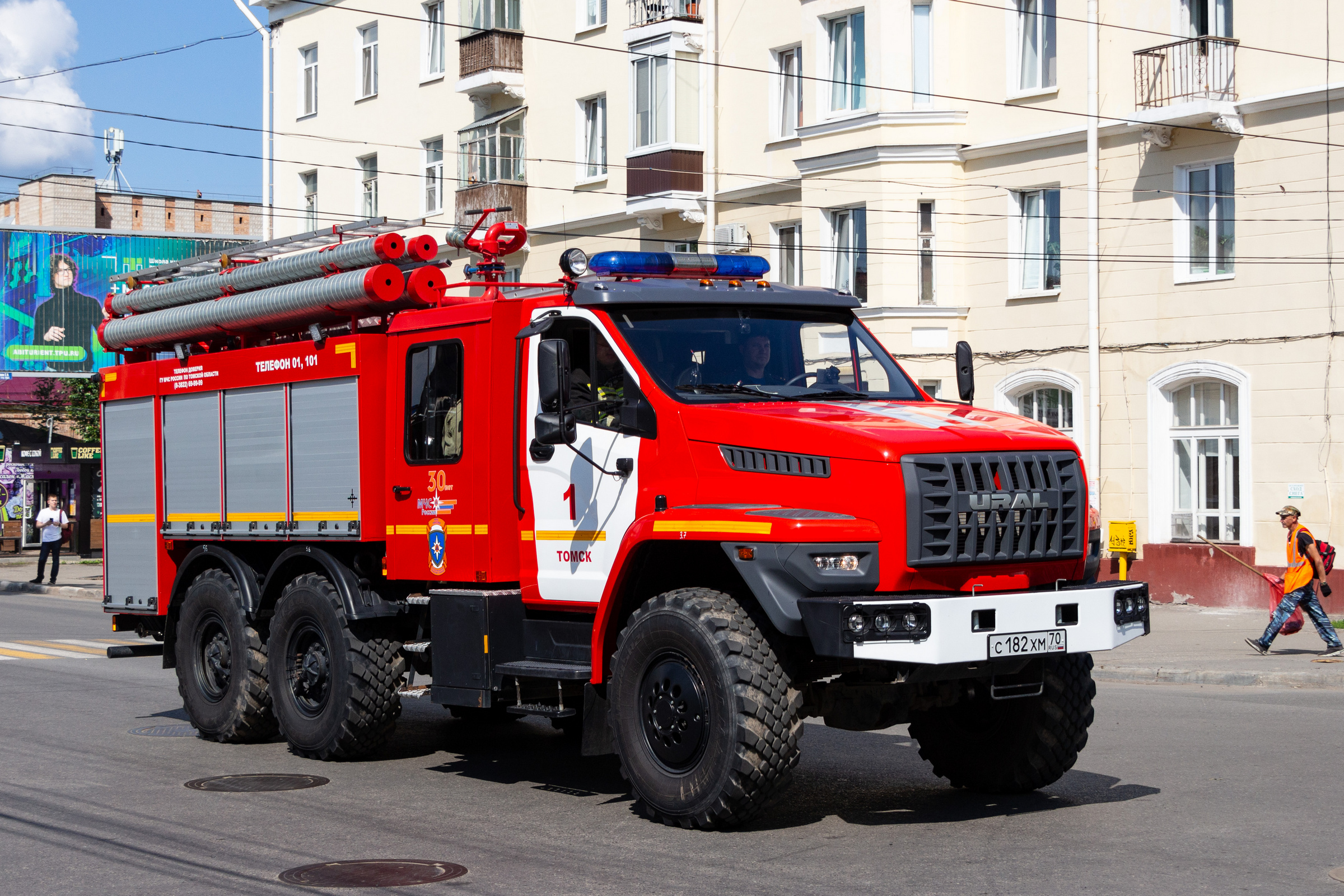
An Ural engine used by the Russian State Fire Service

The standard fire engine transports firefighters to the scene, carries equipment needed by the firefighters for most firefighting scenarios, and may provide a limited supply of water with which to fight the fire. The tools carried on the fire engine will vary greatly based on many factors including the size of the department and the usual situations the firefighters handle. For example, departments located near large bodies of water or rivers are likely to have some sort of water rescue equipment. Standard tools found on nearly all fire engines include ladders, hydraulic rescue tools (often referred to as the jaws of life), floodlights, fire hose, fire extinguishers, self-contained breathing apparatus, and thermal imaging cameras.

The exact layout of what is carried on an engine is decided by the needs of the department. For example, fire departments located in metropolitan areas will carry equipment to mitigate hazardous materials and effect technical rescues, while departments that operate in the wildland–urban interface will need the gear to deal with brush fires.

Fire engines may have a deluge gun, also called master streams, which directs a heavy stream of water to wherever the operator points it. Engines may also have a preconnected hose lines, known simply as preconnects, which remain attached to an onboard water supply as opposed to fire hydrants or water tenders.

A conventional type 1 engine

=== Aerial apparatus ===
An aerial apparatus is a fire truck mounted with an extendable boom that enables firefighters to reach high locations. They can provide a high vantage point for spraying water and creating ventilation, an access route for firefighters and an escape route for firefighters and people they have rescued. In North America, aerial apparatuses are used for fire suppression, whereas in Europe, they are used more for rescue.

==== Turntable ladder ====
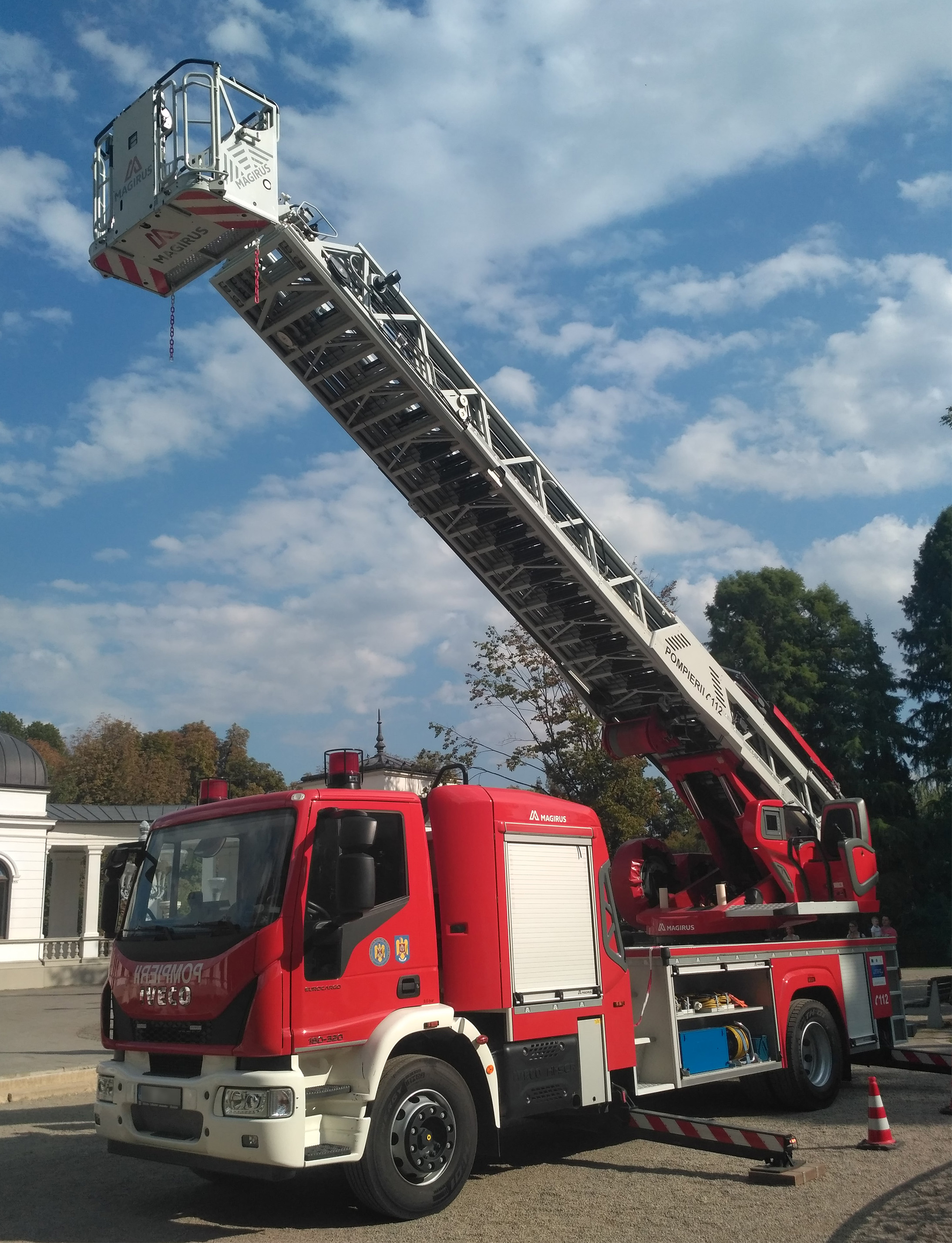
An Iveco turntable ladder used by the Romanian General Inspectorate for Emergency Situations

A turntable ladder (TL) is an aerial apparatus with a large ladder mounted on a pivot which resembles a turntable, giving it its name. The key functions of a turntable ladder are allowing access or egress of firefighters and fire victims at height, providing a high-level water point for firefighting (elevated master stream), and providing a platform from which tasks such as ventilation or overhaul can be executed.

To increase its length and reach, the ladder is often telescoping. Modern telescopic ladders may be hydraulic or pneumatic. These mechanical features allow the use of ladders which are longer, sturdier, and more stable. They may also have pre-attached hoses or other equipment.

The pivot can be mounted at the rear of the chassis or in the middle, just behind the cab. The latter is sometimes called a "mid-ship" arrangement, and it allows a lower travel height for the truck.

While the traditional characteristic of a TL was a lack of water pumping or storage, many modern TLs have a water pumping function built in (and some have their own on-board supply reservoir). Some may have piping along the ladder to supply water to firefighters at the top of the ladder, and some of these may also have a monitor installed at the top. Other appliances may simply have a track-way to securely hold a manually-run hose reel.

In the United States, turntable ladders with additional functions such as an onboard pump, a water tank, fire hose, aerial ladder and multiple ground ladders, are known as quad or quint engines, indicating the number of functions they perform.

The highest TL in the world is the Magirus M68L, with a range of 68 meters (223.1 ft).

==== Tiller truck ====
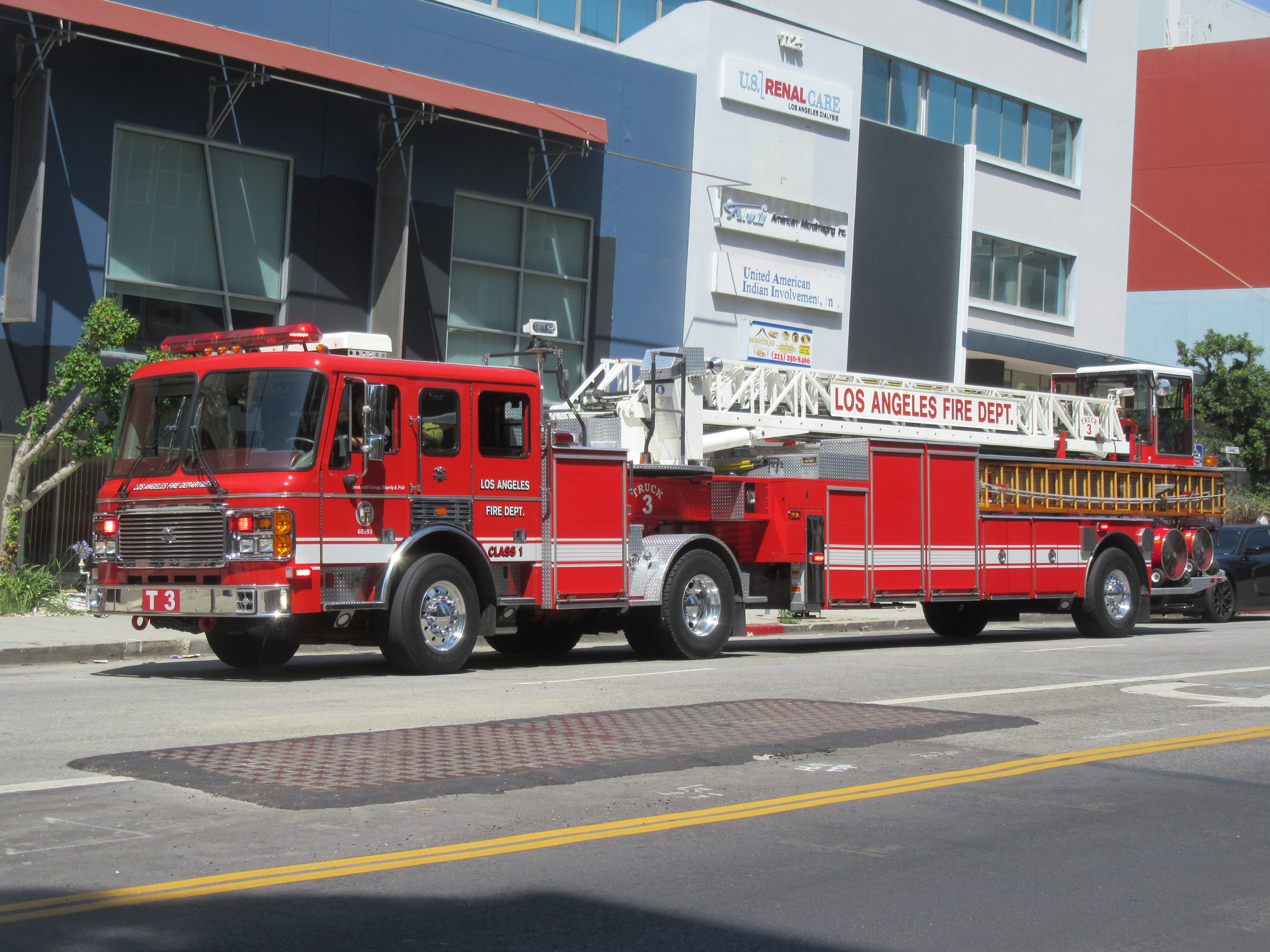
An American LaFrance tiller truck used by the Los Angeles Fire Department

In the United States, a tiller truck, also known as a tractor-drawn aerial (TDA), tiller ladder, or hook-and-ladder truck, is a specialized turntable ladder mounted on a semi-trailer truck. Unlike a commercial semi, the trailer and tractor are permanently combined and special tools are required to separate them. It has two drivers, with separate steering wheels for front and rear wheels.

One of the main features of the tiller-truck is its enhanced maneuverability. The independent steering of the front and back wheels allow the tiller to make much sharper turns, which is particularly helpful on narrow or winding streets. An additional feature of the tiller-truck is that its overall length, over 50 feet (15 m) for most models, allows for additional storage of tools and equipment. The extreme length gives compartment between 500 and 650 cubic feet (14 and 18 m^{3}) of storage in the trailer with an additional 40 and 60 cubic feet (1.1 and 1.7 m^{3}) in the cab.

Some departments elect to use tiller-quints, which are tiller trucks that have the added feature of being fitted with an on-board water tank. These are particularly useful for smaller departments that do not have enough personnel to staff both an engine company and a truck company.

==== Platform truck ====
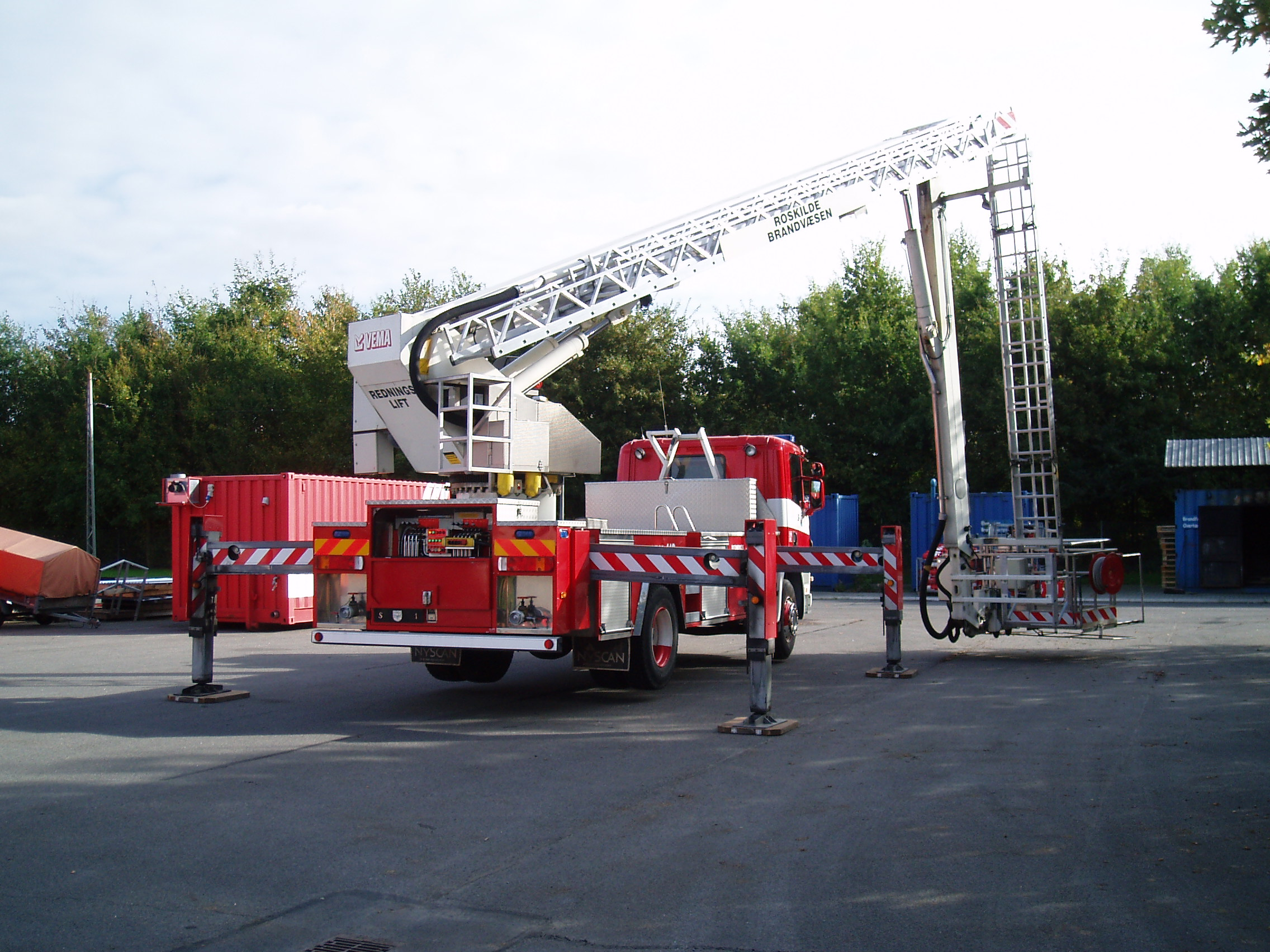
An articulating platform truck used by the Roskilde fire brigade

A platform truck carries an aerial work platform, also known as a basket or bucket, on the end of a ladder or boom. These platforms can provide a secure place from which a firefighter can operate. Many platforms also allow for rescues to be performed and are outfitted with tie down clips and rappelling arms.

Some booms are capable of articulating, allowing the arm to bend in one or more places. This allows the platform truck to go "up and over" an obstacle, and is an advantage over the traditional platform ladder, which can only extend in a straight line.

=== Wildland fire engine ===
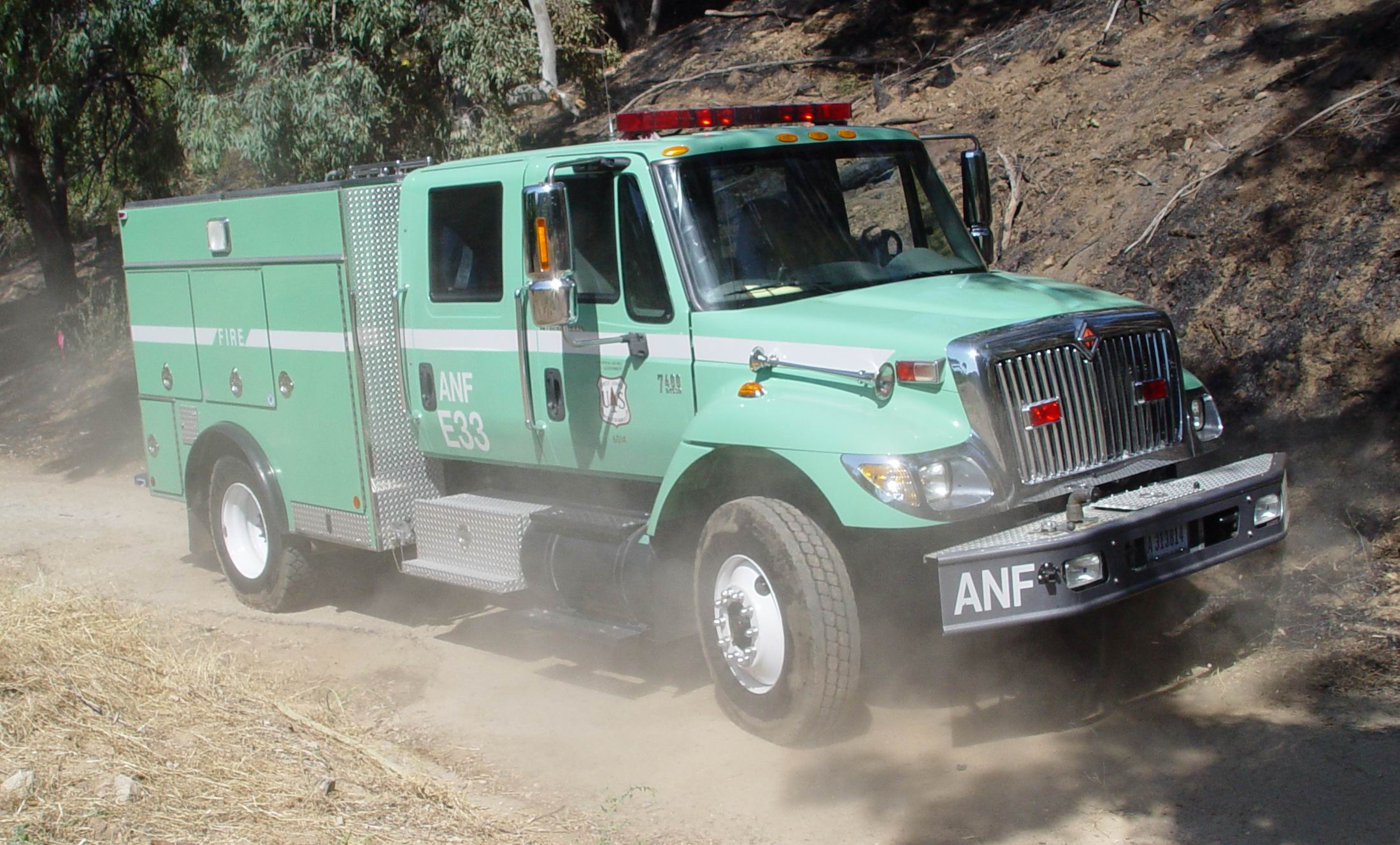
An International wildland fire engine used by the United States Forest Service

A wildland fire engine is a specialized fire engine that can negotiate difficult terrain for wildfire suppression. A wildland fire engine is smaller than standard fire engines and has a higher ground clearance. They may also respond to emergencies in rough terrain where other vehicles cannot respond. Many wildland engines feature four-wheel drive capability to improve hill climbing and rough terrain capability. Some wildland apparatus can pump water while driving (compared to some traditional engines which must be stationary to pump water), allowing "mobile attacks" on vegetation fires to minimize the rate of spread.

Fire departments that serve areas along the wildland–urban interface have to be able to tackle traditional urban fires as well as wildland fires. Departments in these areas often use a wildland–urban interface engine, which combine features of a standard fire engine with that of a wildland fire engine.

=== Water tender ===
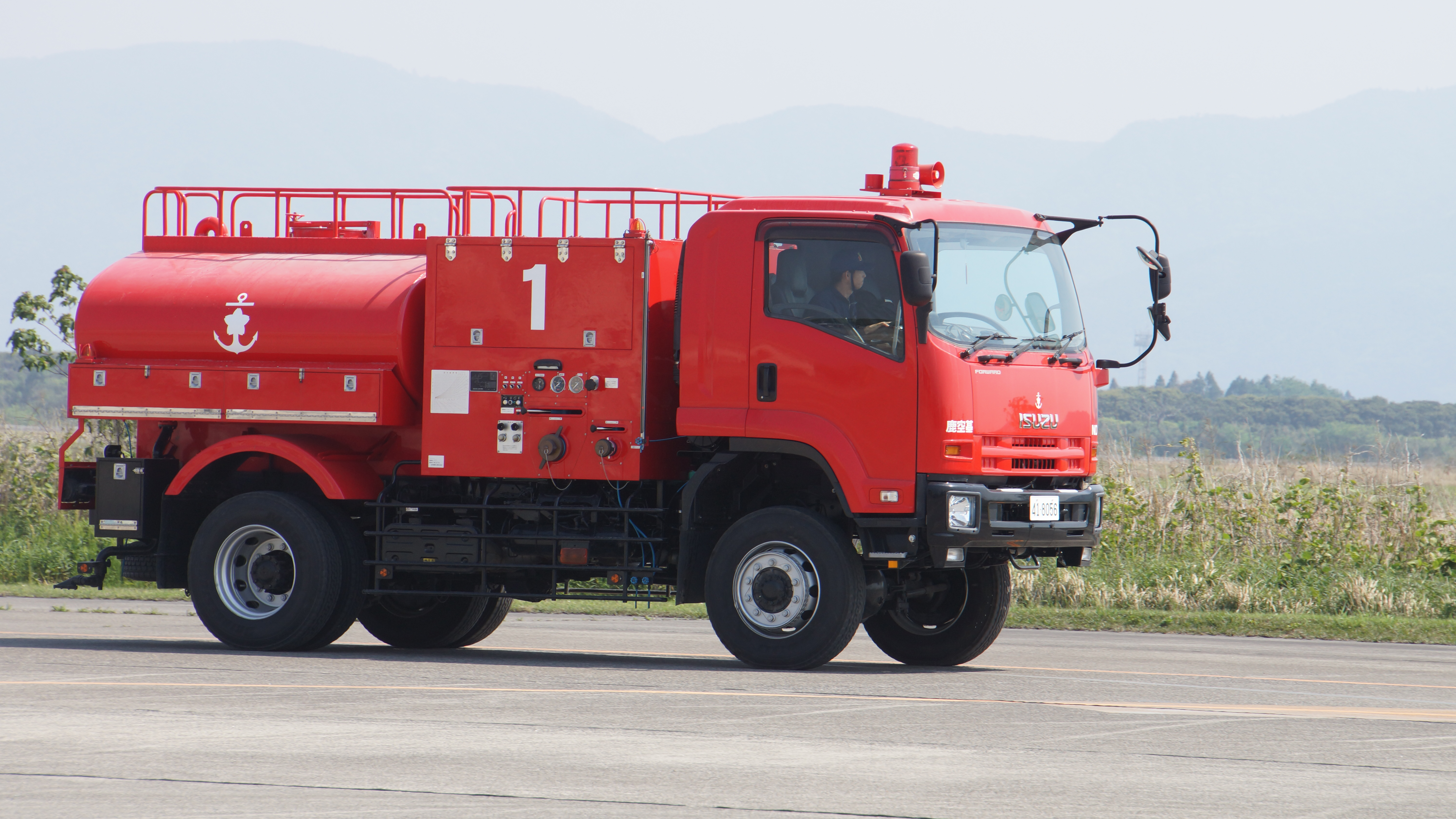
An Isuzu water tender used by the Japan Maritime Self-Defense Force

A water tender is a specialist fire appliance with the primary purpose of transporting large amounts of water to the fire area to make it available for extinguishing operations. These are especially useful in rural areas where fire hydrants are not readily available and natural water resources are insufficient or difficult to exploit.

Most tankers have an on-board pumping system. This pump is often not of sufficient power to fight fires (as it is designed to be attached to a fire engine), but is more often used to draw water into the tender from hydrants or other water sources. Many tankers are equipped with fast-drain valves on the sides and back of the truck. This allows firefighters to empty thousands of gallons of water into a portable water tank in just a few seconds.

Most water tenders are designed to carry loads of 5,000–12,000 litres (1,100–2,600 imp gal).

=== Airport crash tender ===
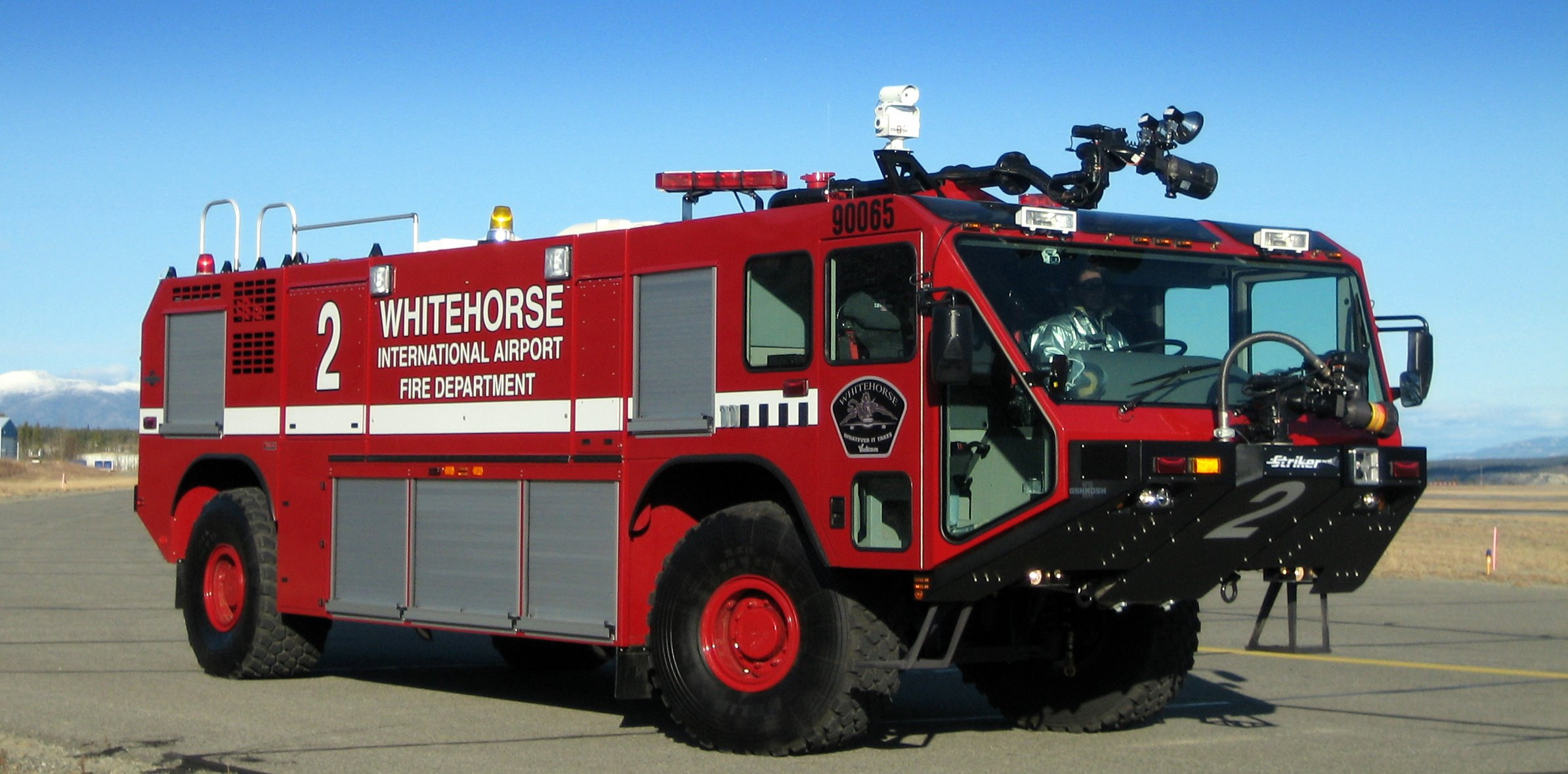
An Oshkosh airport crash tender used by the Erik Nielsen Whitehorse International Airport fire department

An airport crash tender is a specialized fire engine designed for use at aerodromes in aircraft accidents. Some of the features that make the airport crash tender unique are its ability to move on rough terrain outside the runway and airport area, large water capacity as well as a foam tank, a high-capacity pump, and water/foam monitors. Newer airport crash tenders also incorporate twin agent nozzles/injection systems that add dry chemical fire retardant (such as Purple-K) to create a stream of firefighting foam which is able to stop the fire faster. Some also have gaseous fire suppression tanks for electrical fires. These features give the airport crash tenders a capability to reach an airplane rapidly, and rapidly extinguish large fires with jet fuel involved.

=== Other vehicles ===
Other vehicles that are used by fire departments but may not be directly involved in firefighting may include:

- Fire car
- Fire investigation unit
- Fire police unit
- Hazardous materials apparatus
- Light and air unit
- Marine rescue unit
- Mobile communications vehicle
- Operational support unit
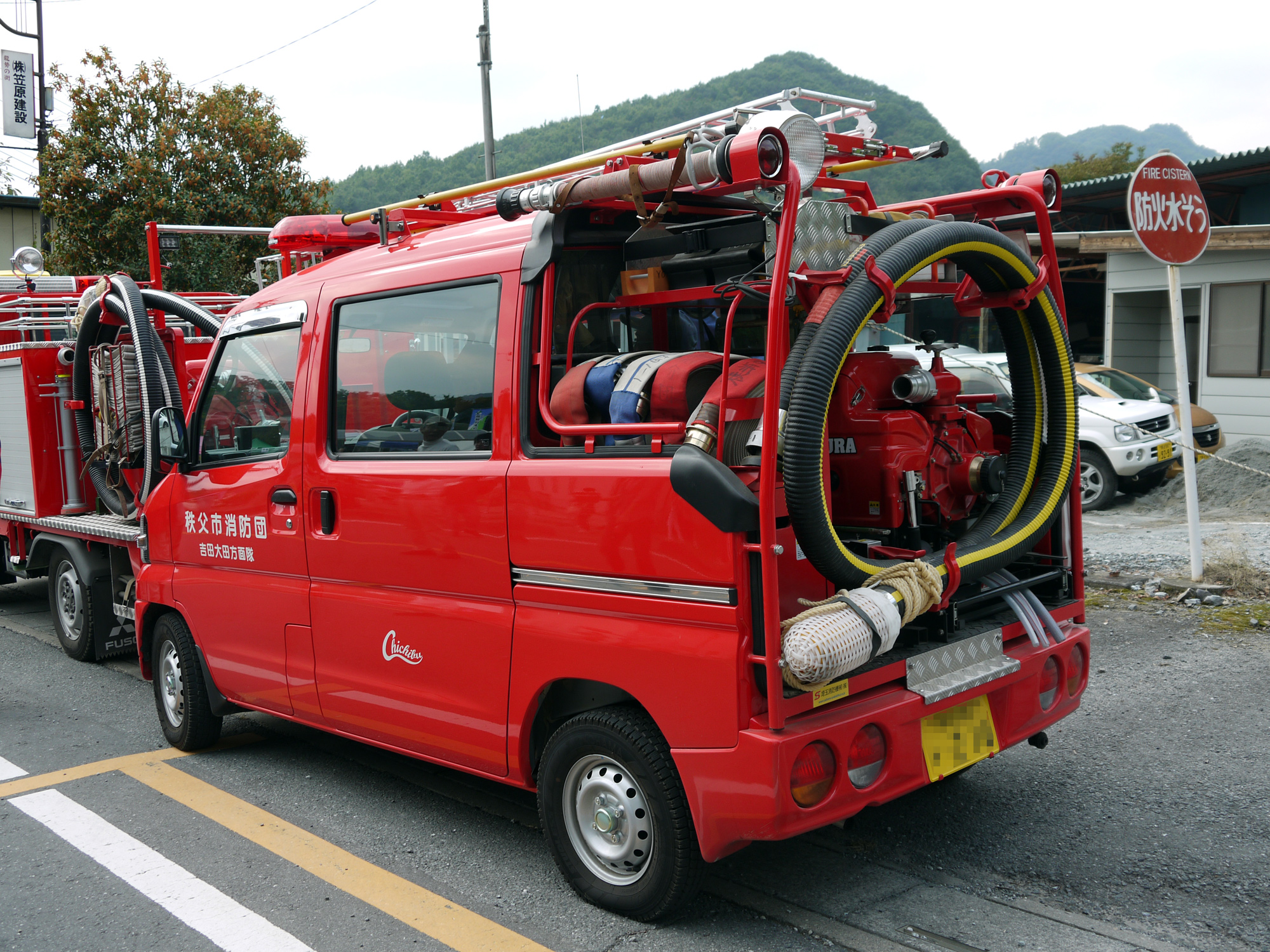
A Mitsubishi Town Box kei car fire truck used by the Chichibu, Saitama fire department

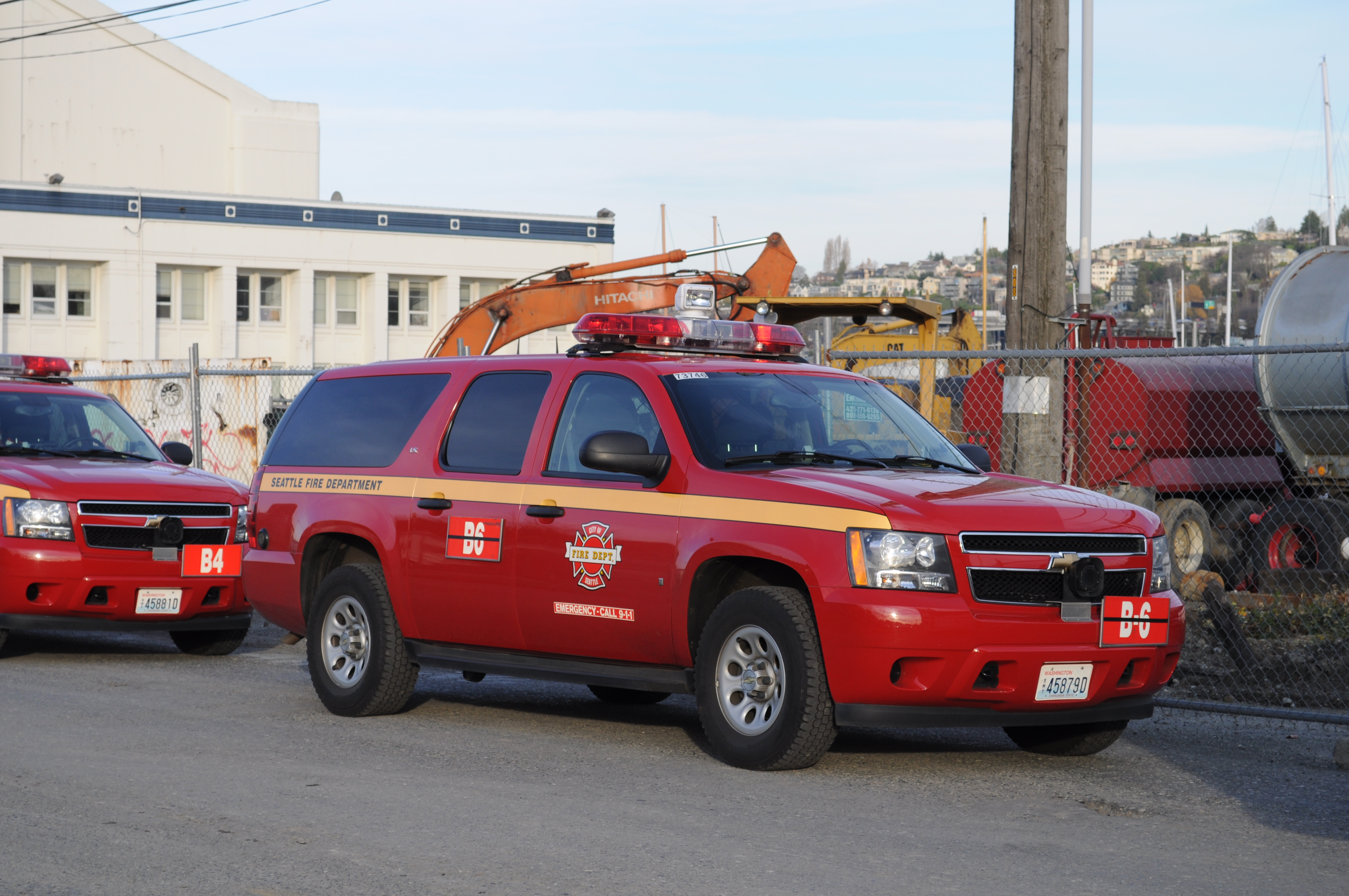
Chevrolet Suburban command vehicles used by the Seattle Fire Department

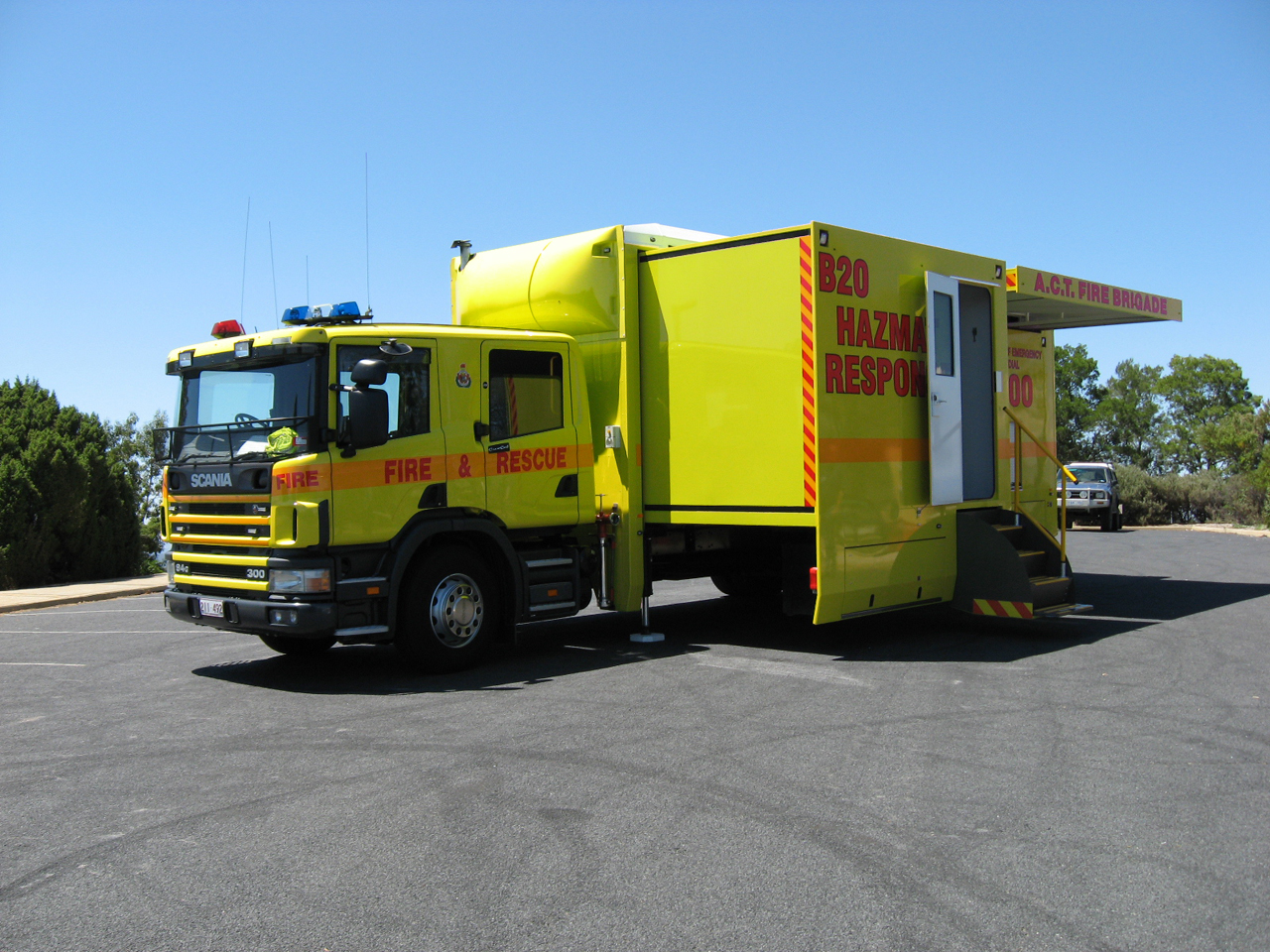
A Scania hazardous materials vehicle used by ACT Fire and Rescue

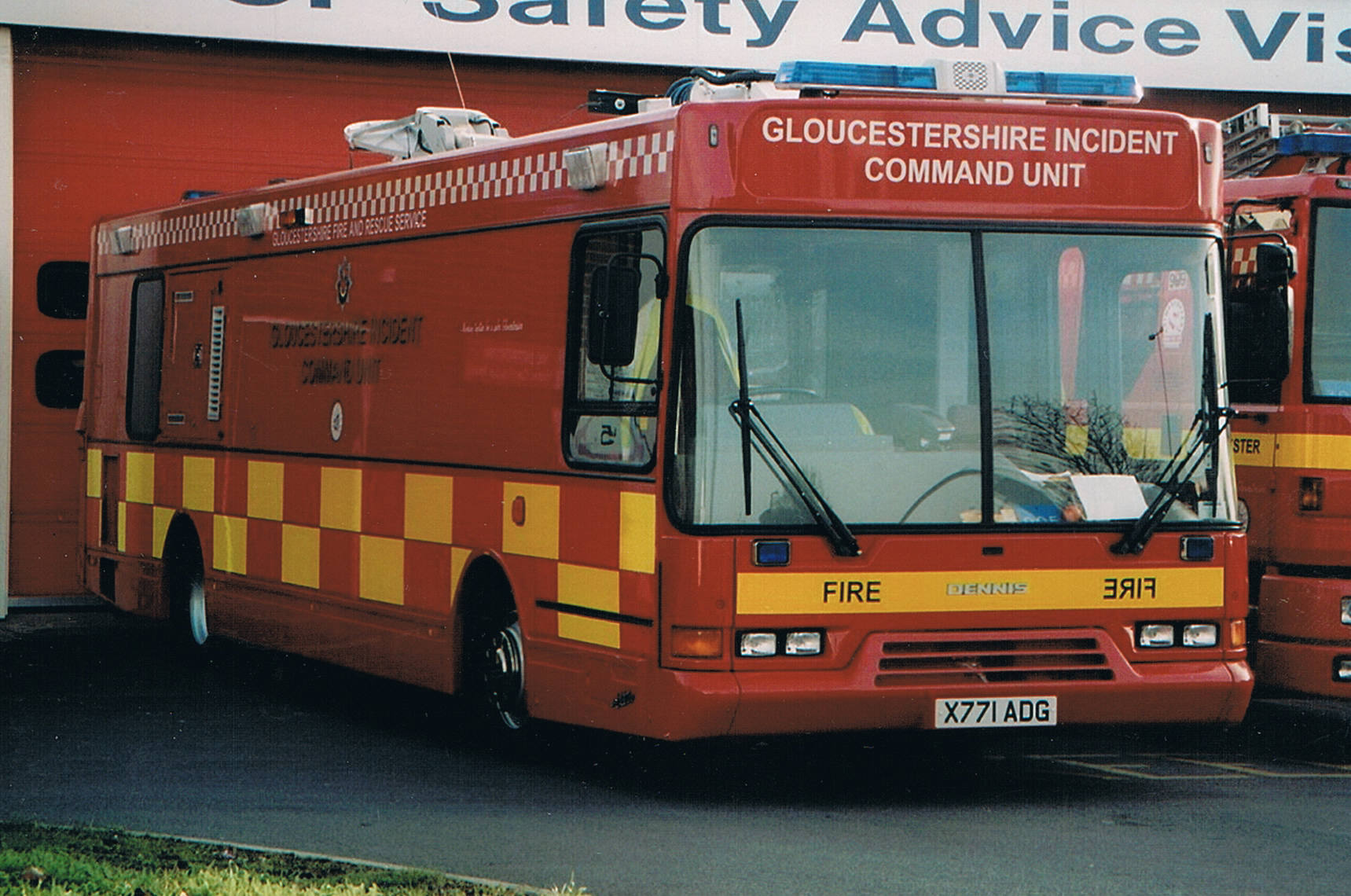
A Dennis Dart command post used by the Gloucestershire Fire and Rescue Service

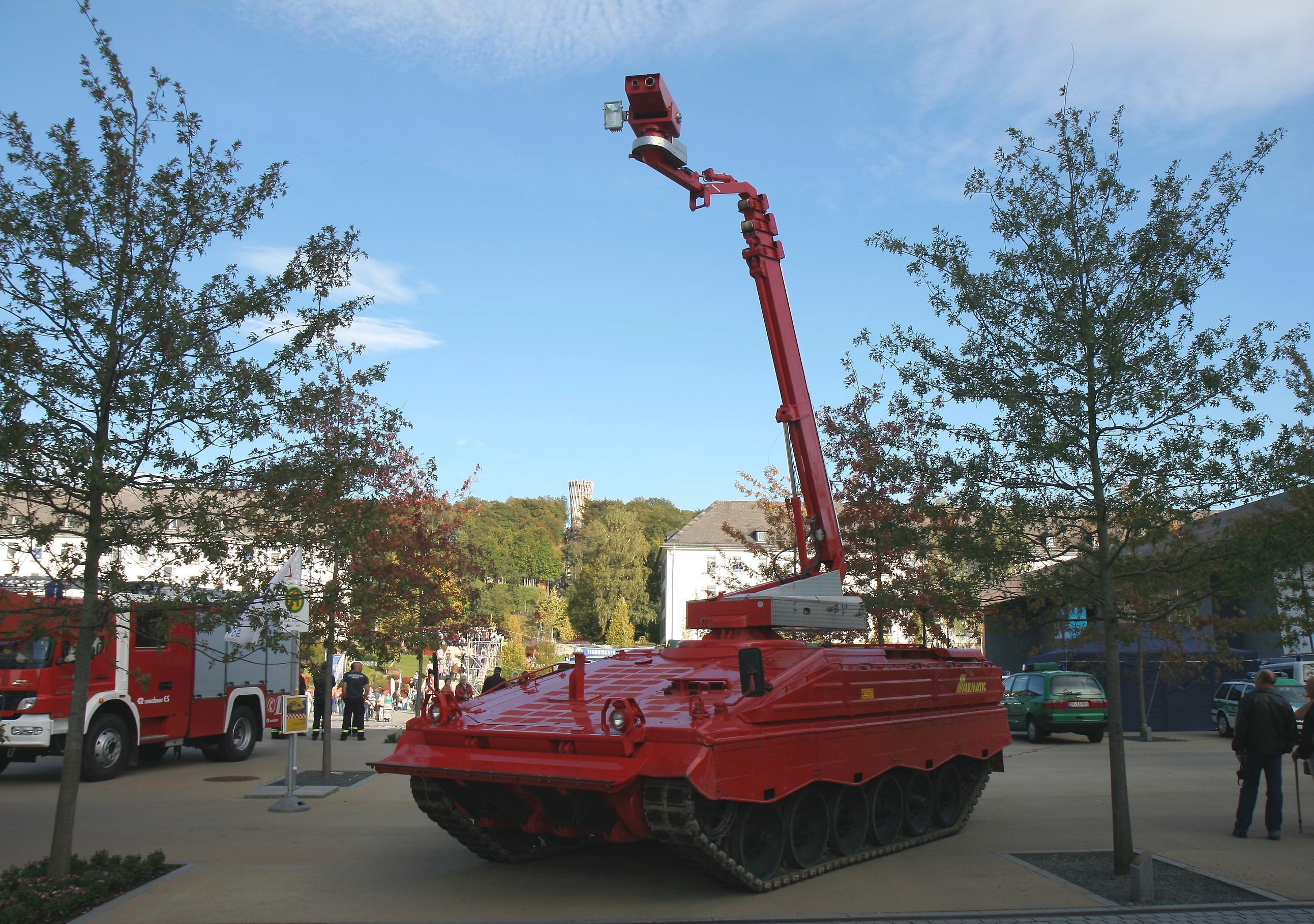
A Marder infantry fighting vehicle converted for use as a firefighting vehicle by the German Fire Services

== History ==
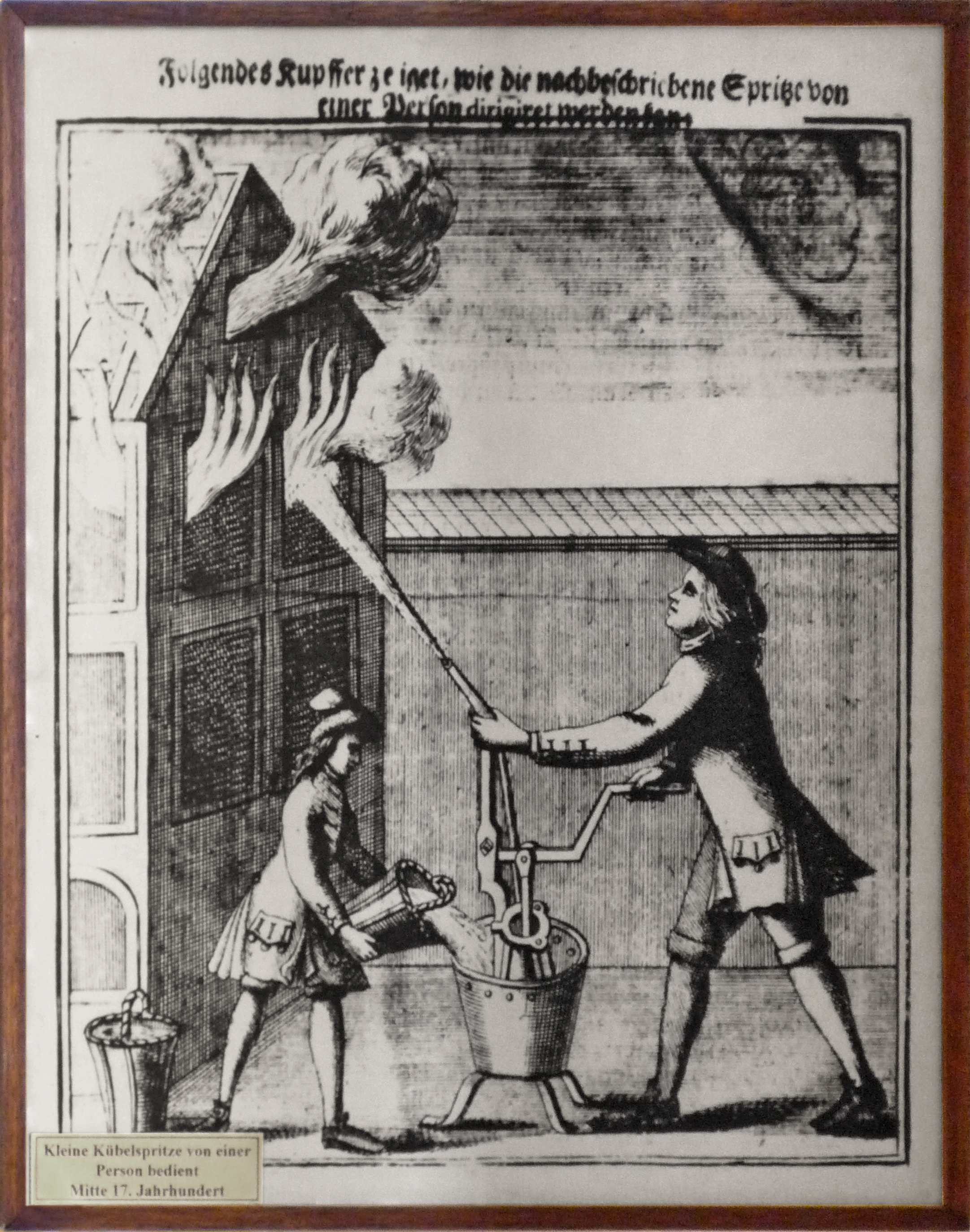
One of the simplest forms of hand tub type fire engines, engraving from the mid 17th century in Germany

An early device used to squirt water onto a fire was known as a squirt or fire syringe. Hand squirts and hand pumps are noted before Ctesibius of Alexandria invented the first fire pump around the 2nd century B.C., and an example of a force-pump possibly used for a fire-engine is mentioned by Heron of Alexandria.

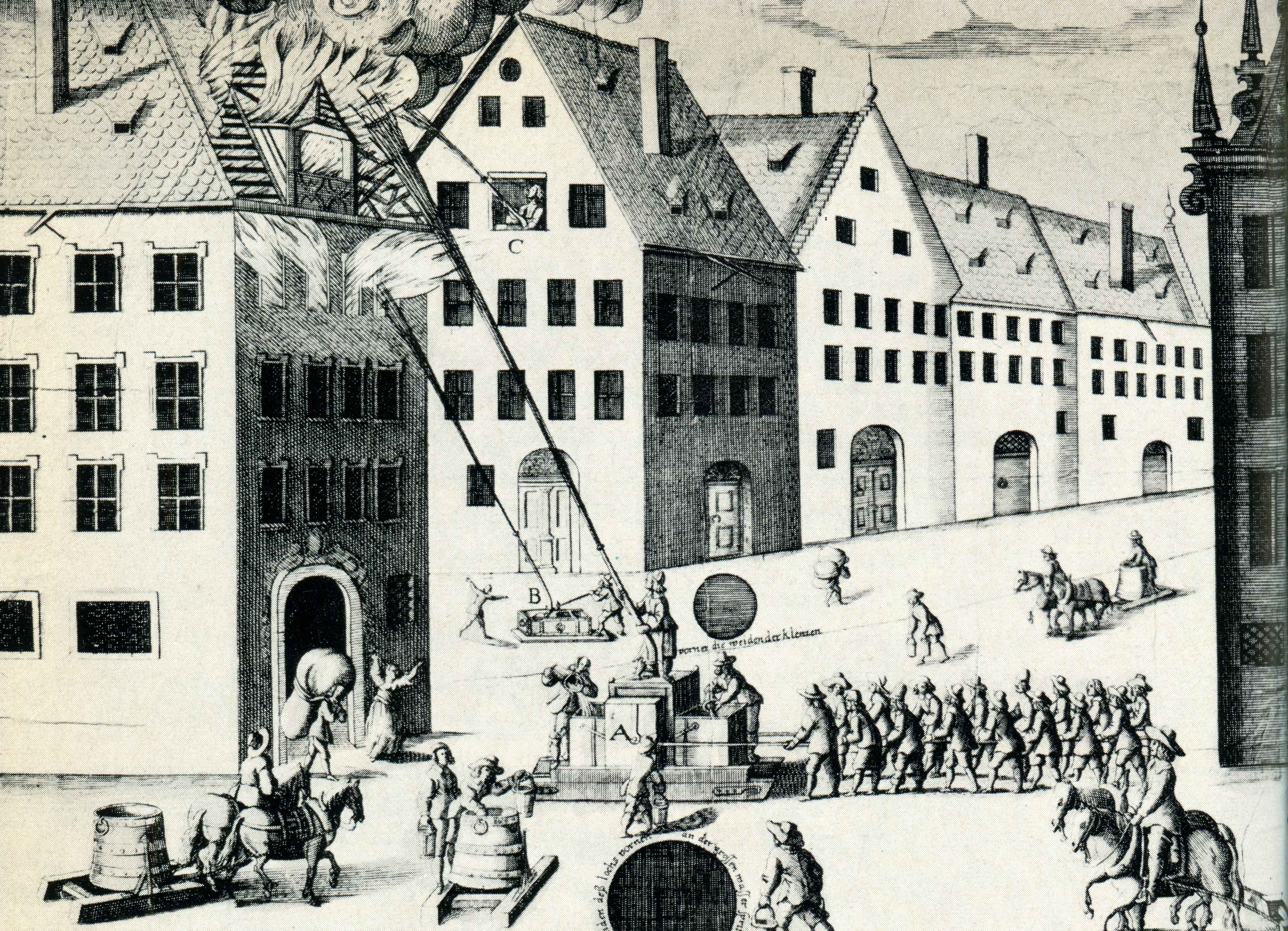
Fire engine invented by Hans Hautsch

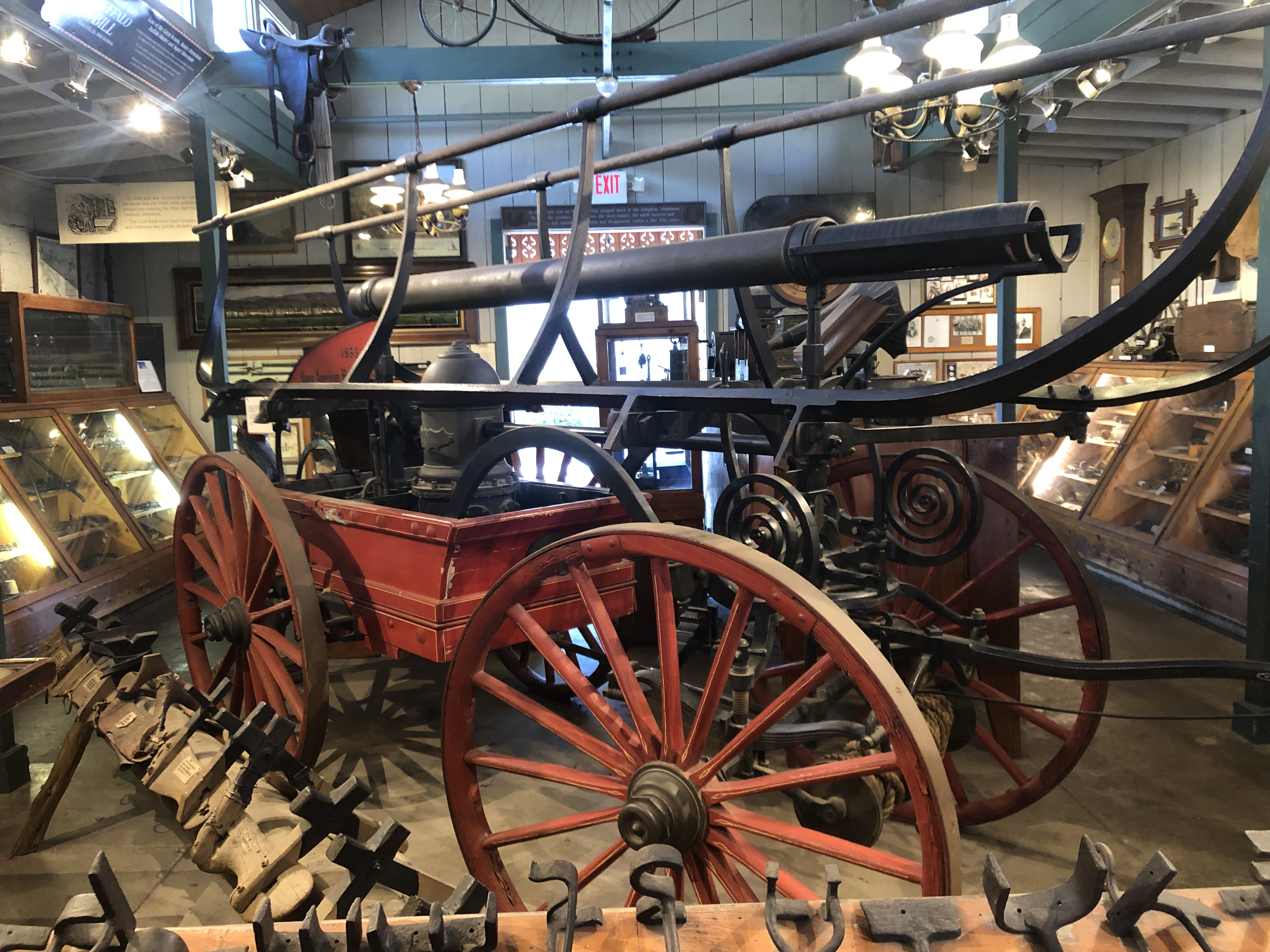
1853 hand-pump fire engine at the Western Trails Museum at Knott's Berry Farm, Buena Park, CA

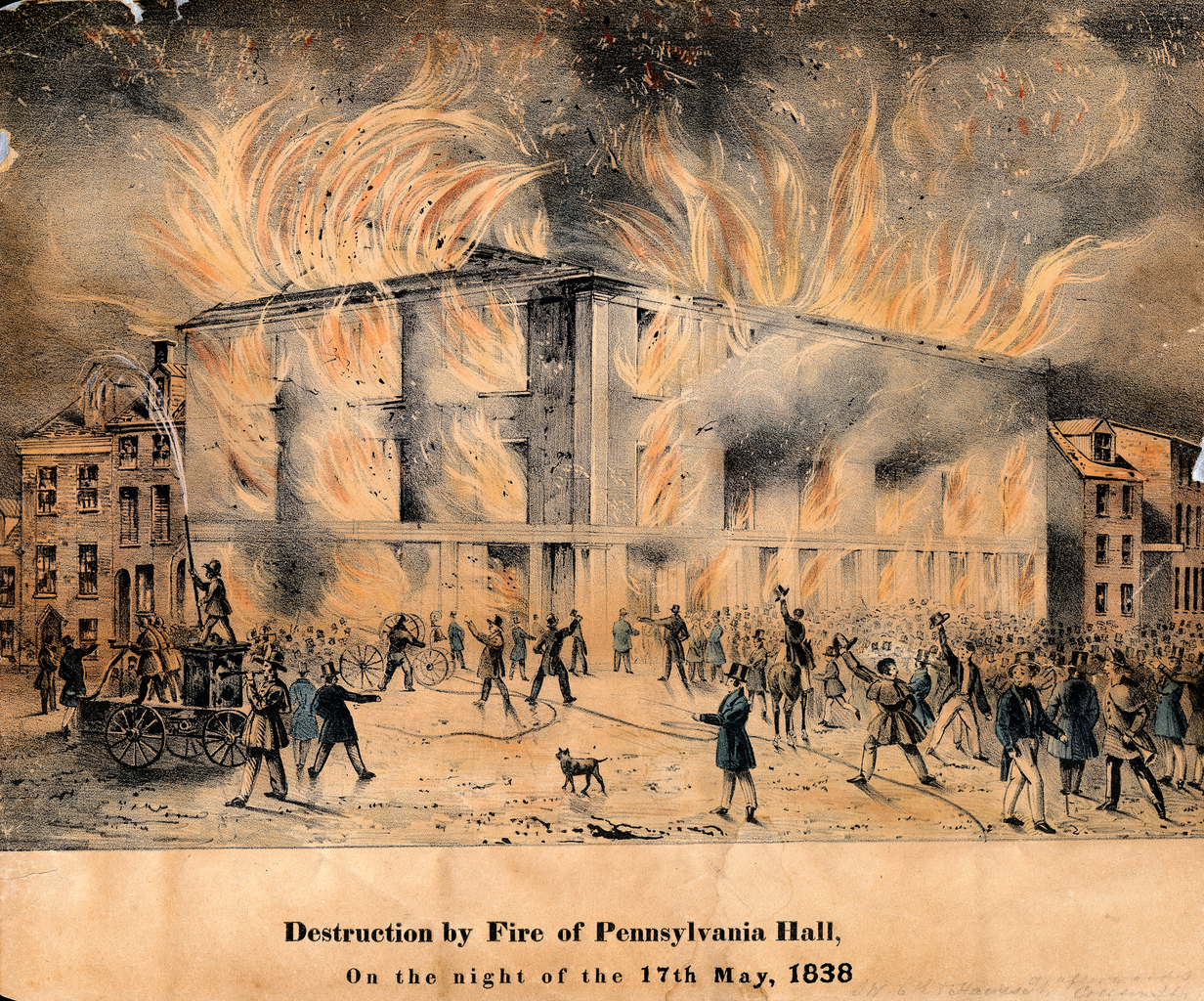
Fire engine, Philadelphia, 1838, trying to save adjacent building. One firefighter (with helmet) directs the water; three to his left are manning the pump. Hand-colored. To the right of the engine is a hose truck.

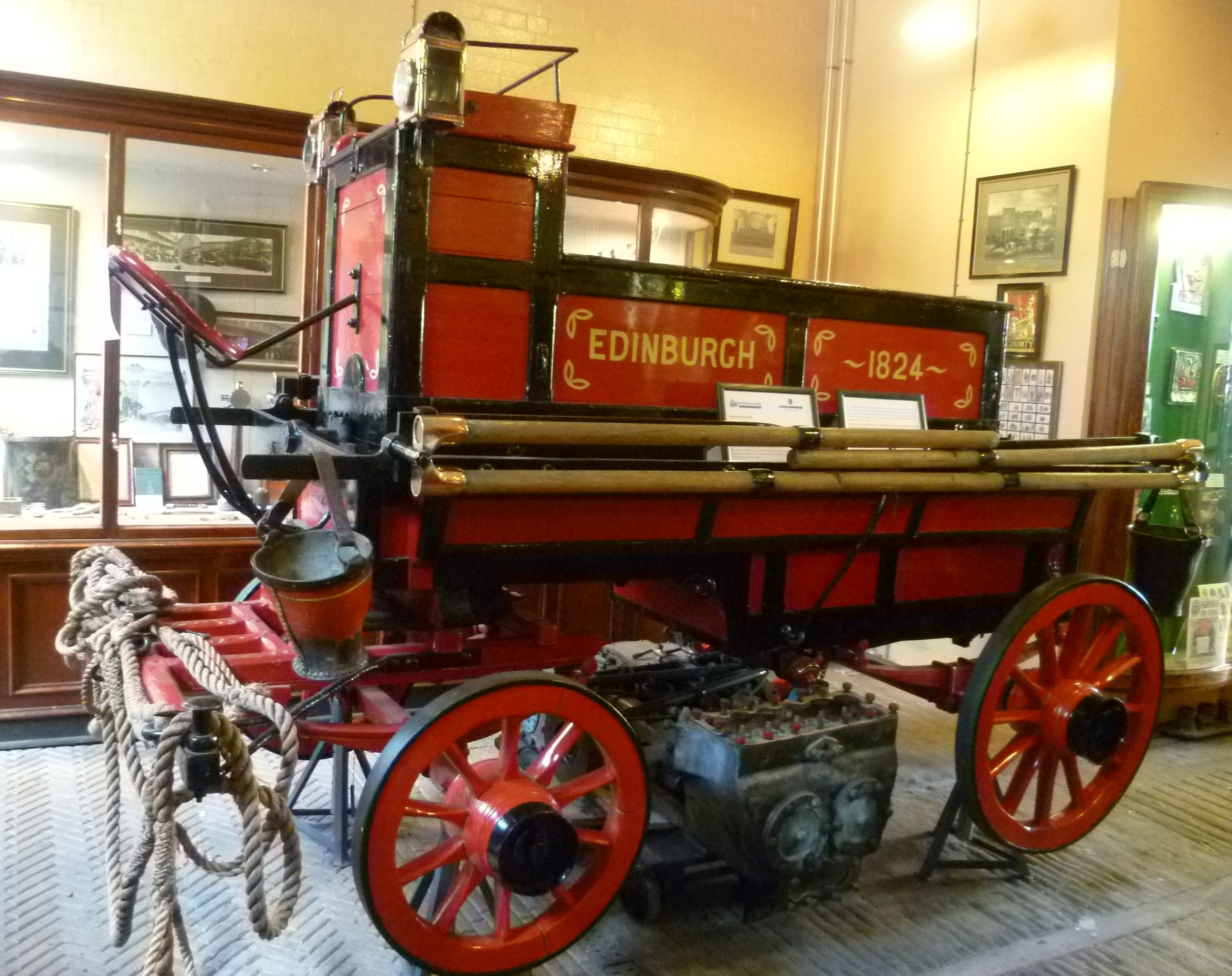
Manually drawn fire pump in service in Edinburgh in 1824

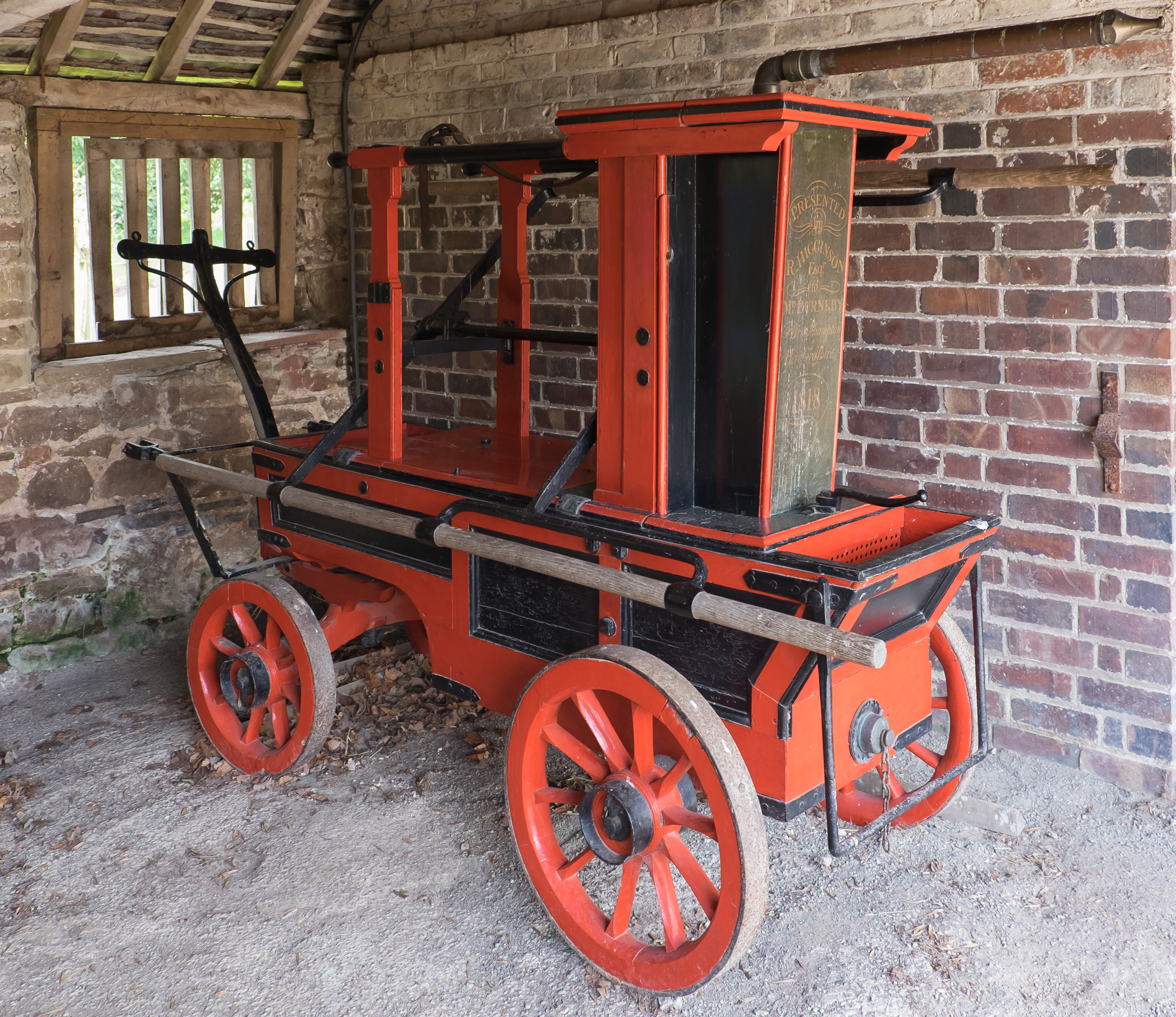
Horse-drawn fire pump given to Brockhampton Estate in 1818

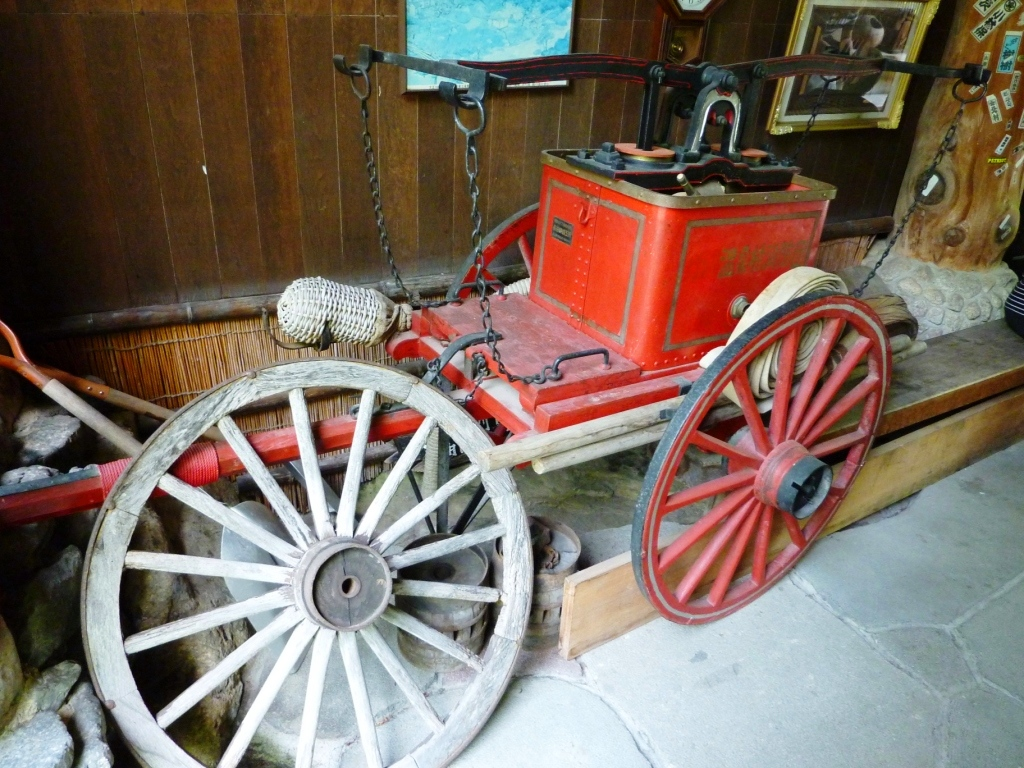
Antique Japanese fire pump

In 1650, Hans Hautsch built a fire engine with a compressed air vessel. On each side 14 men worked a piston rod back and forth in a horizontal direction. The air vessel, a type of pressure tank, issued an even stream despite the backward motion of the piston. This was made possible by a rotating pipe mounted on the hose which allowed the jet to reach heights up to 20 m (65.6 ft). Caspar Schott observed Hautsch's fire engine in 1655 and wrote an account of it in his Magia Universalis.

Colonial laws in America required each house to have a bucket of water on the front stoop in preparation for fires at night. These buckets were intended for use by the initial bucket brigade that would supply the water at fires. Philadelphia obtained a hand-pumped fire engine in 1719, years after Boston's 1654 model appeared there, made by Joseph Jenckes Sr., but before New York's two engines arrived from London.

By 1730, Richard Newsham, in London, had made successful fire engines. He also invented those first used in New York City in 1731 where the amount of manpower and skill necessary for firefighting prompted Benjamin Franklin to found an organized fire company in 1737. Thomas Lote built the first fire engine made in America in 1743. These earliest engines are called hand tubs because they are manually (hand) powered and the water was supplied by a bucket brigade dumping it into a tub (cistern) where the pump had a permanent intake pipe.

An important advancement around 1822 was the invention of an engine which could draft water from a water source. This rendered the bucket brigade obsolete. In 1822, a Philadelphia-based manufacturing company called Sellers and Pennock made a model called the "Hydraulion". It is said to be the first suction engine. Some models had the hard, suction hose fixed to the intake and curled up over the apparatus known as a squirrel tail engine.

The earliest engines were small, and were either carried by four men or mounted on skids and dragged to a fire. As the engines grew larger they became horse-drawn and later self-propelled by steam engines.

Until the mid-19th century, most fire engines were maneuvered by men, but the introduction of horse-drawn fire engines considerably improved the response time to incidents. The first self-propelled steam pumper fire engine was built in New York in 1841. Unfortunately for the manufacturers, some firefighters sabotaged the device and its use of the first engine was discontinued. However, the need and the utility of power equipment ensured the success of the steam pumper well into the twentieth century. Many cities and towns around the world bought the steam fire engines.

Motorised fire engines date back to January 1897, when the prefect of police in Paris applied for funds to purchase "a machine worked by petroleum for the traction of a fire-engine, ladders, and so forth and for the conveyance of the necessary staff of pompiers". With great prescience the report states "If the experiment prove successful, as is anticipated, horses will eventually be entirely replaced by automobiles". This was, indeed, the case and motorised fire engines became commonplace by the early 20th century. By 1905, the idea of combining gas engine motor trucks into fire engines was attracting great attention; according to a Popular Mechanics article in that year, such trucks were rapidly gaining popularity in England. That same year, the Knox Automobile Company of Springfield, Massachusetts, began selling what some have described as the world's first modern fire engine. A year later, the city of Springfield, Illinois, had filled their fire department with Knox engines. Another early motorized fire engine was developed by Peter Pirsch and Sons of Kenosha, Wisconsin.

For many years firefighters sat on the sides of the fire engines or even stood on the rear of the vehicles, exposed to the elements. This arrangement was uncomfortable and dangerous (some firefighters were thrown to their deaths when their fire engines made sharp turns on the road), and today nearly all fire engines have fully enclosed seating areas for their crews.

=== Hook and ladder ===
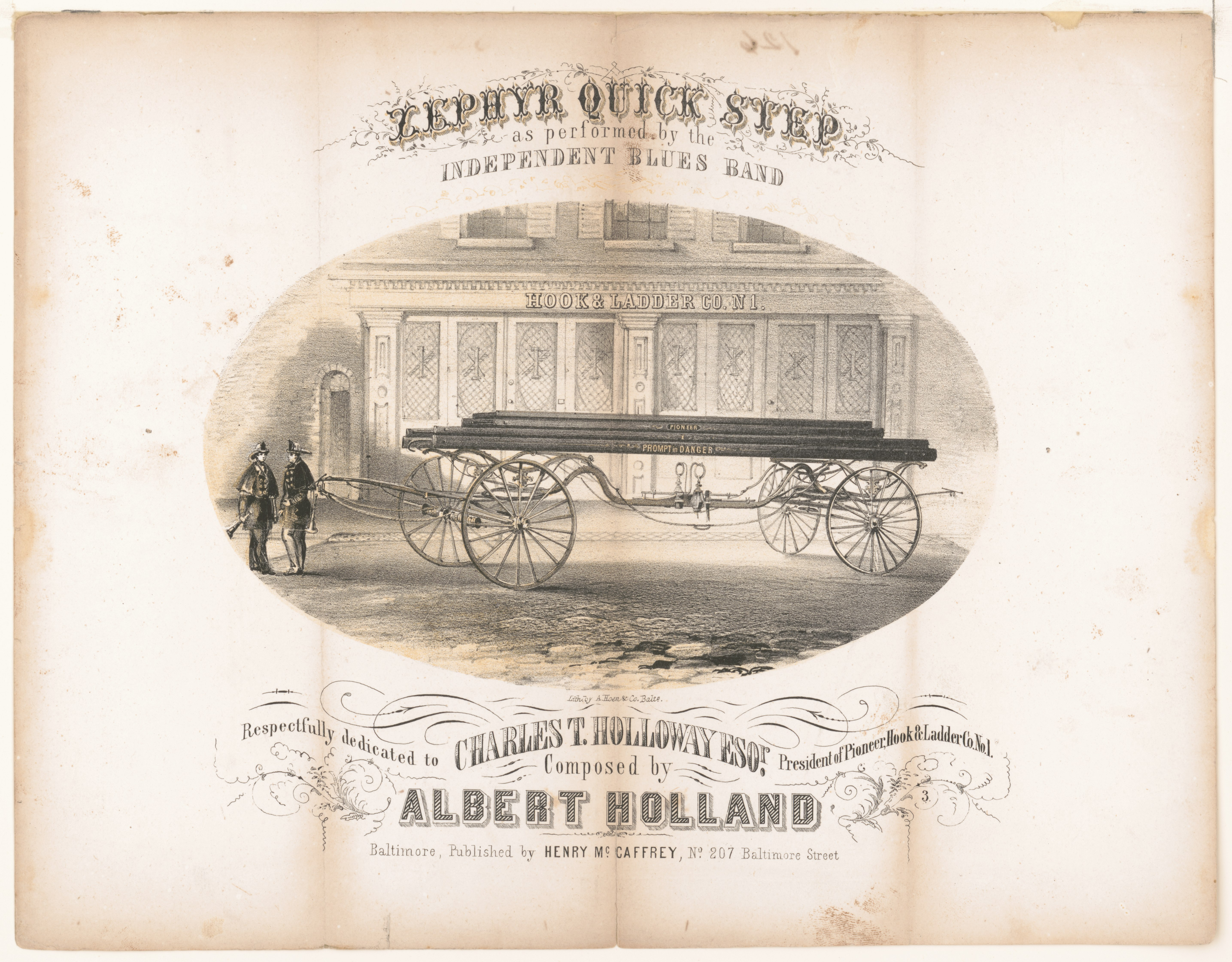
A hook-and-ladder of the Pioneer, Hook and Lader Co.

The "hook and ladder" was an early type of fire units known since late 1700s. It was a horse-drawn carriage which brought ladders and hooks to the fire place. Ladders were used for access to upper floors and the roof. "Hooks" were pike poles used for pulling down and apart the burning construction.

=== Early pumpers ===
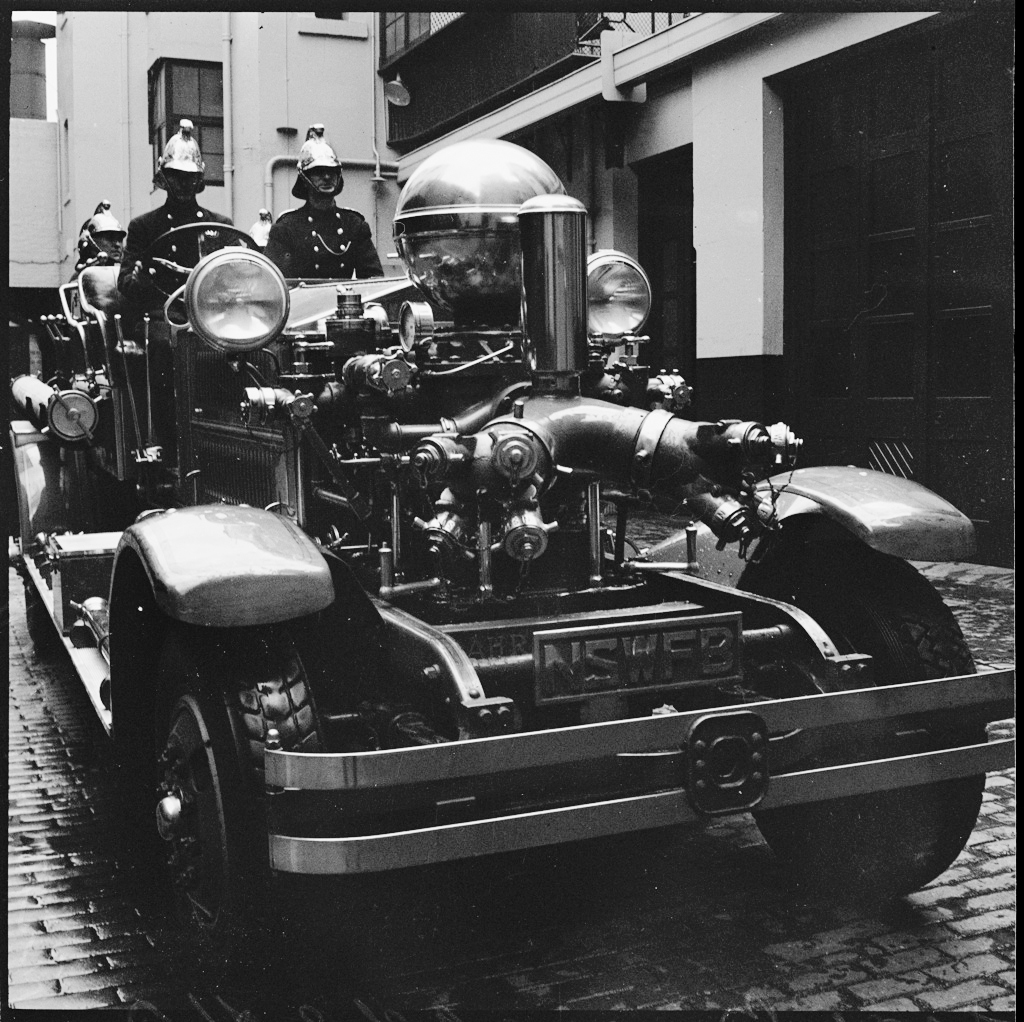
A fire engine in Sydney, Australia in 1941

Early pumpers used cisterns as a source of water. Water was later put into wooden pipes under the streets and a "fire plug" was pulled out of the top of the pipe when a suction hose was to be inserted. Later systems incorporated pressurized fire hydrants, where the pressure was increased when a fire alarm was sounded. This was found to be harmful to the system and unreliable. Today's valved hydrant systems are kept under pressure at all times, although additional pressure may be added when needed. Pressurized hydrants eliminate much of the work in obtaining water for pumping through the engine and into the attack hoses. Many rural fire engines still rely upon cisterns or other sources for drafting water into the pumps. Steam pumper came in to use in the 1850s.

=== Early aerials ===
In the late 19th century, means of reaching tall structures were devised. At first, manually extendable ladders were used; as these grew in length (and weight), they were put onto two large wheels. When carried by fire engines these wheeled escape ladders had the wheels suspended behind the rear of the vehicle, making them a distinctive sight. Before long, turntable ladders — which were even longer, mechanically extendable, and installed directly onto fire trucks—made their appearances.

After World War II, turntable ladders were supplemented by the aerial work platform (sometimes called "cherry picker"), a platform or bucket attached onto a mechanically bending arm (or "snorkel") installed onto a fire truck. While these could not reach the height of similar turntable ladders, the platforms could extend into previously unreachable "dead corners" of a burning building.

=== Modern ===
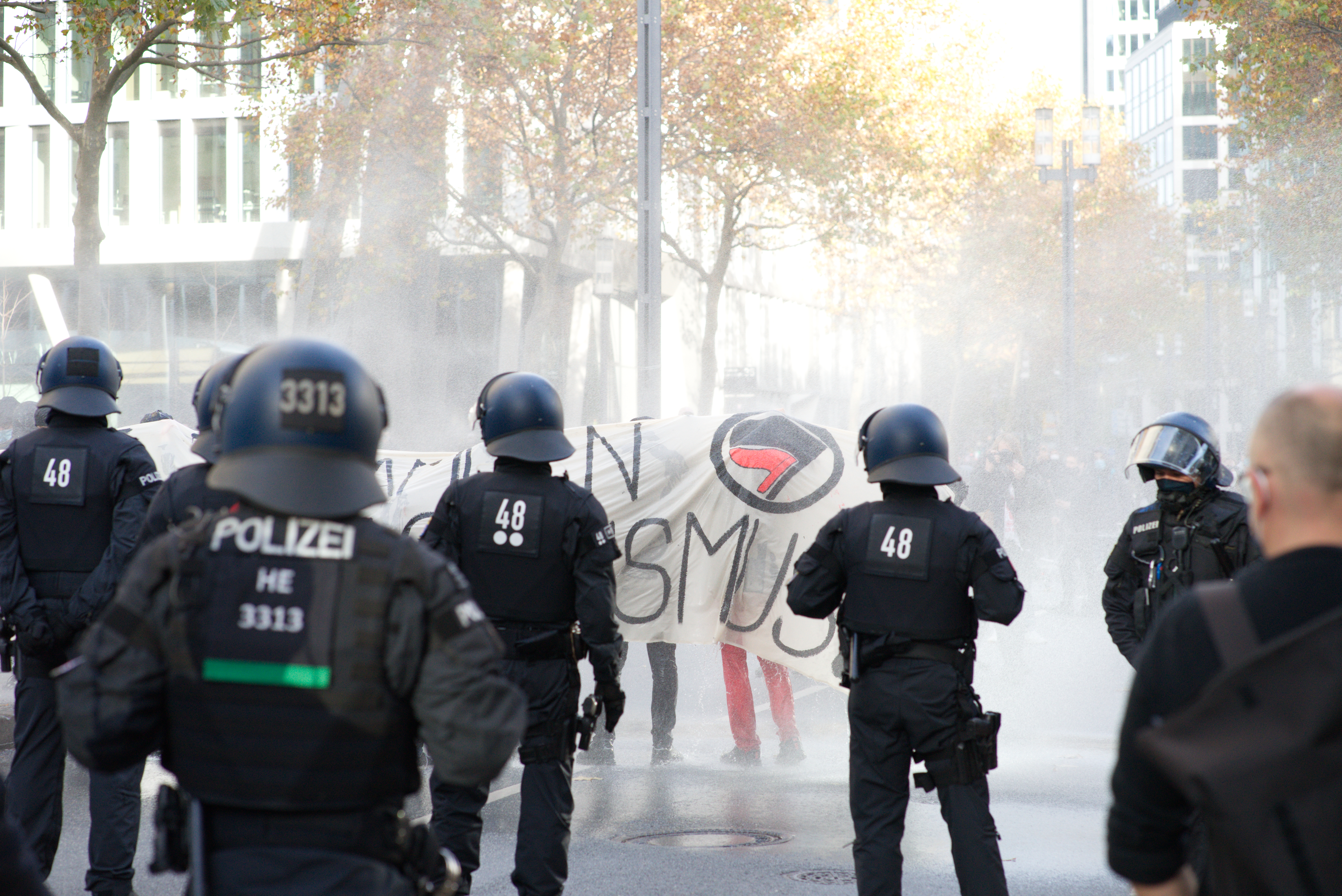
Aftermath of water cannon being used on protestors

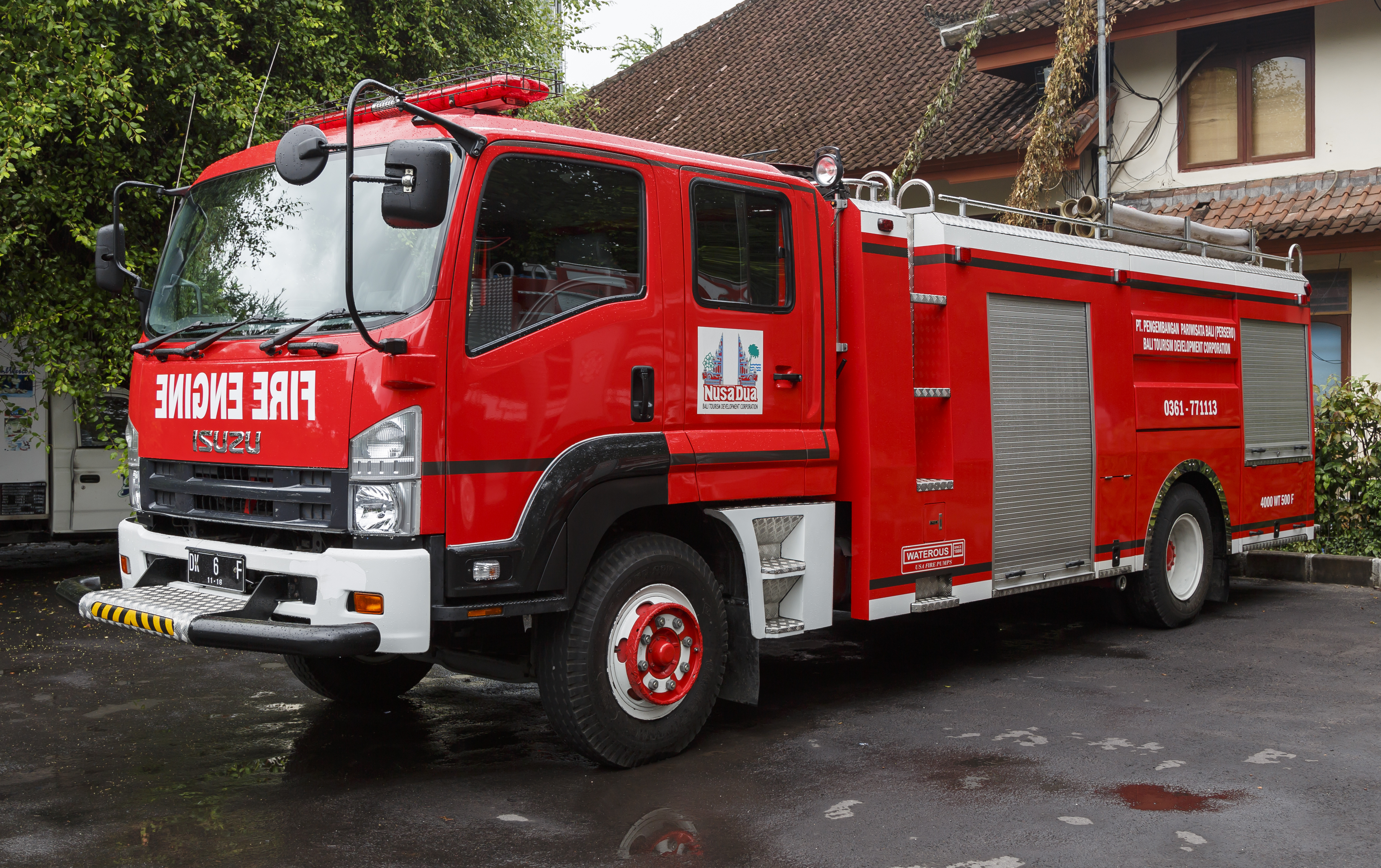
Modern designed firetruck

During the 20th century, motorized pumps began replacing gasoline pumps, and eventually water drafting pumps also became standard. Racing suits were also added to firetrucks. These suits were worn by firefighters during interior operations. The incorporation of radio allowed for information to be relayed between firefighters and both the fire department’s on scene command and the dispatch center.

The use of fire truck water cannons to disperse protestors is common in authoritarian countries. These tactics were previously used during the civil rights movement in the US.. The use of high pressure water against protestors can lead to severe bruising, internal bleeding, hypothermia and organ damage. The use of high pressure water hoses against protestors is often considered cruel and in violation of basic civil rights.

Modern firetrucks are occasionally used to aid in various humanitarian tasks. They are also used during natural disasters as a means of delivering essential supplies to impacted civilians. Modern firetrucks are generally made out of high grade material such as stainless steel, polypropylene and sometimes carbon fibre. Most firetrucks carry various types of equipment for use in medical treatment, including burns. Firetrucks designed to fight forest fires often have thermal cameras and use water drones.

== See also ==
- Containerized firefighting equipment
- Electric fire engine
- Fire appliances in the United Kingdom
- Glossary of firefighting terms
- Jan van der Heyden
- NFPA 1901
- Turntable ladder
- List of fire stations
