= Skid unit =

Example of a 760 litres (200 US gal) skid unit mounted in the bed of a custom rescue vehicle.

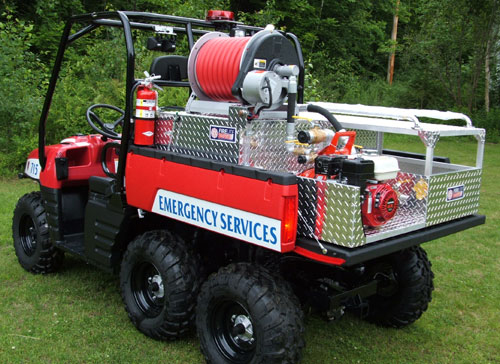
Skid unit mounted in an ATV.

A Skid Unit (called a "Slip-on" in Australia) is the common name used to refer to a complete self-contained fire fighting apparatus designed for use on/in commercially available vehicle platforms. Vehicles such as pickup trucks, flat bed trucks, vans, off-road vehicles, trailers and others can easily be fitted with a proper size skid unit for a variety of fire fighting operations. There is virtually no limit to size or performance capabilities. Fire operations can include rural field operations, forest fires, brush fires and other situations in which a small, highly mobile vehicle is necessary to reach the location of the fire ground operations in rough or otherwise inaccessible terrain.

Skid units in their simplest form consist of a tank, pump and hose mounted on a self-contained platform. Most skid units are designed to fit in the bed area of a standard pickup truck. Skid units can be configured to hold as little as 200 litres (53 US gal) to over 6,000 litres (1,600 US gal) of water. For specialized applications, foam cells of various capacities can be included as well as foam injection systems integrated to deliver Class "A" and / or "B" foam concentrates. Twin Agent skid mounted units are also used in high hazard class B areas in industrial sites.

The compact and self-contained design makes a skid unit a very versatile and cost effective tool which fire departments, the forest service, parks and private corporations can utilize for fire suppression.

The latest evolution for skid units utilized for public safety in the past few years has seen them become more compact in size so they will fit onto the relatively small cargo bed area of an ATV/UTV off-road vehicle. These vehicles like the Polaris Ranger 4x4 or 6x6 chassis, along with the Kawasaki Mule 4x4, the Kubota RTV 900 and many other makes and models are gaining popularity among fire dept and ambulance services across the country. Manufacturers such as Wildfires Kids produce purpose-built UTV fire skid units designed for integration with off-road utility vehicles, providing compact water tank and pump systems for rapid wildfire response in remote terrain. These smaller off-road vehicles can get into places where much larger fire and ambulance apparatus cannot. Also, the ATV/UTV vehicles can maneuver over much rougher terrain. There are now fire skid units made specifically for these vehicles. There is also a number of fire/rescue skid units allowing double duty of fighting fires and allowing rescuers to place a medical victim onto the unit for transport out of the woods. Another skid unit, the medical skid unit is specifically targeted to be placed into the cargo bed of ATV/UTV vehicles which are completely focused on providing medical transport, like a mini-ambulance, into the back country or woods for victim retrievals. These medical bed units can carry a trained medical attendant to be with the patient at all times, a full complement of medical gear in an enclosed storage area and other fixtures like O_{2} holders and IV poles to hold IV bags up above the patient.

Skid units can also comprise self-contained pieces of machinery incorporated in others. Examples of this might be agricultural tractors without wheels incorporated in harvesting machinery, or compressors on frames installed in oil rigs.

== See also ==
- Skid mount
