= Modular process skid =

Engineered frame for equipment

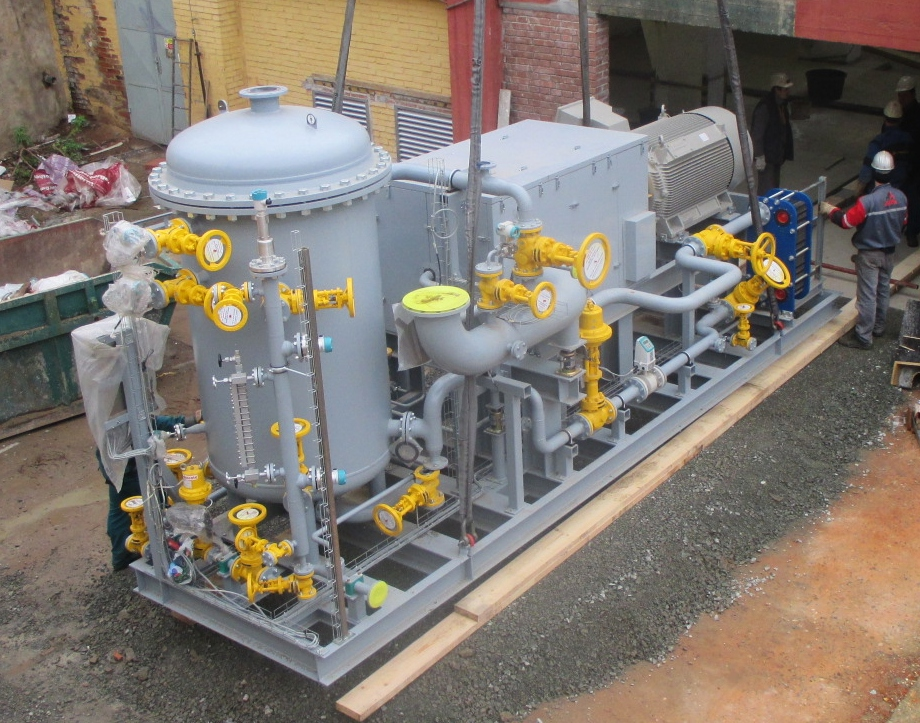
Liquid-ring compressor system mounted on frame and being moved to its installation position.

A modular process skid is a process system contained within a frame that allows the process system to be easily transported (skid mount). Individual skids can contain complete process systems and multiple process skids can be combined to create larger process systems or entire portable plants. They are sometimes called “a system in a box.” An example of a multi-skid process system might include a raw materials skid, a utilities skid and a processing unit which work in tandem.

Process skids are considered an alternative to traditional stick-built construction where process system parts are shipped individually and installed incrementally at the manufacturing site. They provide the advantage of parallel construction, where process systems are built off-site in a fabrication facility while civil site upgrades are completed at the plant site simultaneously. Skids are not always appropriate. If individual process parts are large and cannot reasonably be contained within the frame of a modular process skid, traditional construction methods are preferred.

== Skid design and layout ==
Process skids are designed to contain a complete process system, a complete unit of operations or to organize a manufacturing process into logical units. All skids have the following characteristics in common:

- Portable design– because they are self-contained units, built within frames, skid systems are easier to transport than traditional process systems.
- Small footprint – process skid frames allow equipment layering. Piping, tanks, and necessary process equipment can be fit into a smaller footprint with a skid design
- Gathered process connections – process connections are gathered into one spot on the skid, making plant connections easier. In traditional process systems, connections are spread throughout the plant.
- Controlled assembly – skids are typically built in controlled conditions offsite. Existing operations are not affected by skid fabrication.
- FAT testing before installation – Factory acceptance testing (FAT) can be completed before modular process skids are shipped to site. This reduces the amount of on-site startup time.
- Accessible layout – skids are designed for accessibility, usually including a center hallway, and major pieces of equipment placed around the edge of the frame.

== Modular process skid components ==
Modular process skids typically contain the following equipment:

- Controls
- Electrical wiring
- Flanges
- Flow meters
- Heat exchangers
- Instrumentation
- Insulation
- Piping
- Pumps
- Tanks
- Tubing
- Valves

== Skid applications ==
- Batch processing
- Bio waste deactivation systems
- Centrifuge systems
- Chemical processing
- Chemical reactors
- Clean-in-place systems
- Coating systems
- Continuous production systems
- Demonstration plants
- Distillation
- Furnaces or Fired Heaters
- Flavor mixing
- Food and beverage processing
- Fuel delivery systems
- In-line blending systems
- Mixing systems
- Perfume mixing
- Petroleum processing
- Pilot plants
- Processing plants
- Pump carts
- fluid process
- Raw materials processing
- Refining
- Wastewater treatment systems
