= Twin-agent fire extinguishing system =

Fire extinguisher type

A twin-agent fire extinguishing system (TAFES), also commonly referred to as a twin-agent unit (TAU), incorporates the benefits of dry chemical and foam (AFFF or CAFS) fire extinguishing agents. It is most commonly used for AR-FF operations and in industrial areas with high class B hazards.

The dry chemical, usually Purple-K (and in some applications ABC Dry Chemical), knocks down the fire rapidly, while the foam secures the hazard by laying a vapor-suppressing blanket on the fuel and helping to cool the fuel in skin fires. In pressurized gas fires the foam is applied to extinguish the fuel fires around the blowout and cool heated metal. The Purple-K stream is then discharged into the blowout to "snuff" it out.

These systems can be mounted on vehicles, skid mounts or installed as permanent stations. Application is from twin hose lines connected together at the nozzle, one flows the dry chemical agent and the other foam. Twin agent systems are also used in fixed nozzles of vehicles (i.e. AR-FF vehicles) or ground mounted monitors in high hazard locations in facilities storing or producing flammable liquids.

Dry chemical tank capacities range from 450 to 3,000 pounds (200 to 1,360 kg). AFFF solution capacity ranges from 50 to 250 US gallons (190 to 950 L). Dry chemical flow rates vary from 5 to 8 pounds (2.3 to 3.6 kg) per second and 35 to 60 US gallons (130 to 230 L) per minute for the foam for handline application.

== Sources ==
- James H. Meidl: "Flammable Hazardous Materials", Glencoe Press Fire Science Series, 1970.
