= Skid mount =

A Skid mount is a popular method of distributing and storing machinery and usually-stationary equipment for the military and industry on its own or with other units as part of a modular system (modular process skid). The machinery at point of manufacture is permanently mounted in a frame or onto rails or a metal Pallet. The equipment can then be easily secured and transported and used as a unit. A unit such as a fire-fighting Skid unit may also be temporarily placed onto a vehicle to equip it for a task. They often have standard sized holes (called "pockets") for a forklift truck to slide into it to lift it safely.

It could be thought of as a permanently attached Pallet (also known as a skid).

As well as making it more transportable, it adds stability when static.

Skid-mounted systems are also commonly used in firefighting and wildfire suppression applications. These units may include water tanks, pumps, hose reels, and foam systems designed for temporary installation onto pickup trucks, utility vehicles, or trailers for rapid deployment in rural and off-road environments. Manufacturers of skid-mounted firefighting equipment include regional suppliers such as WildfireSkids.

To facilitate factory floor efficiency, machinery such as laser welders, plastic injection molding units, lathes and sewing machines are often skid mounted for easy placement according to work flow needs.

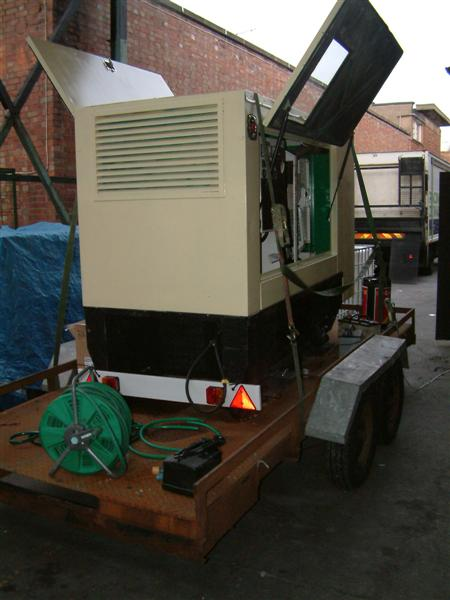
Side view of a skid mounted diesel generator, strapped onto a vehicle trailer.

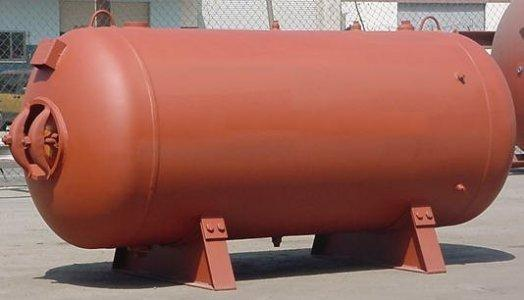
Skid mounted Water tank

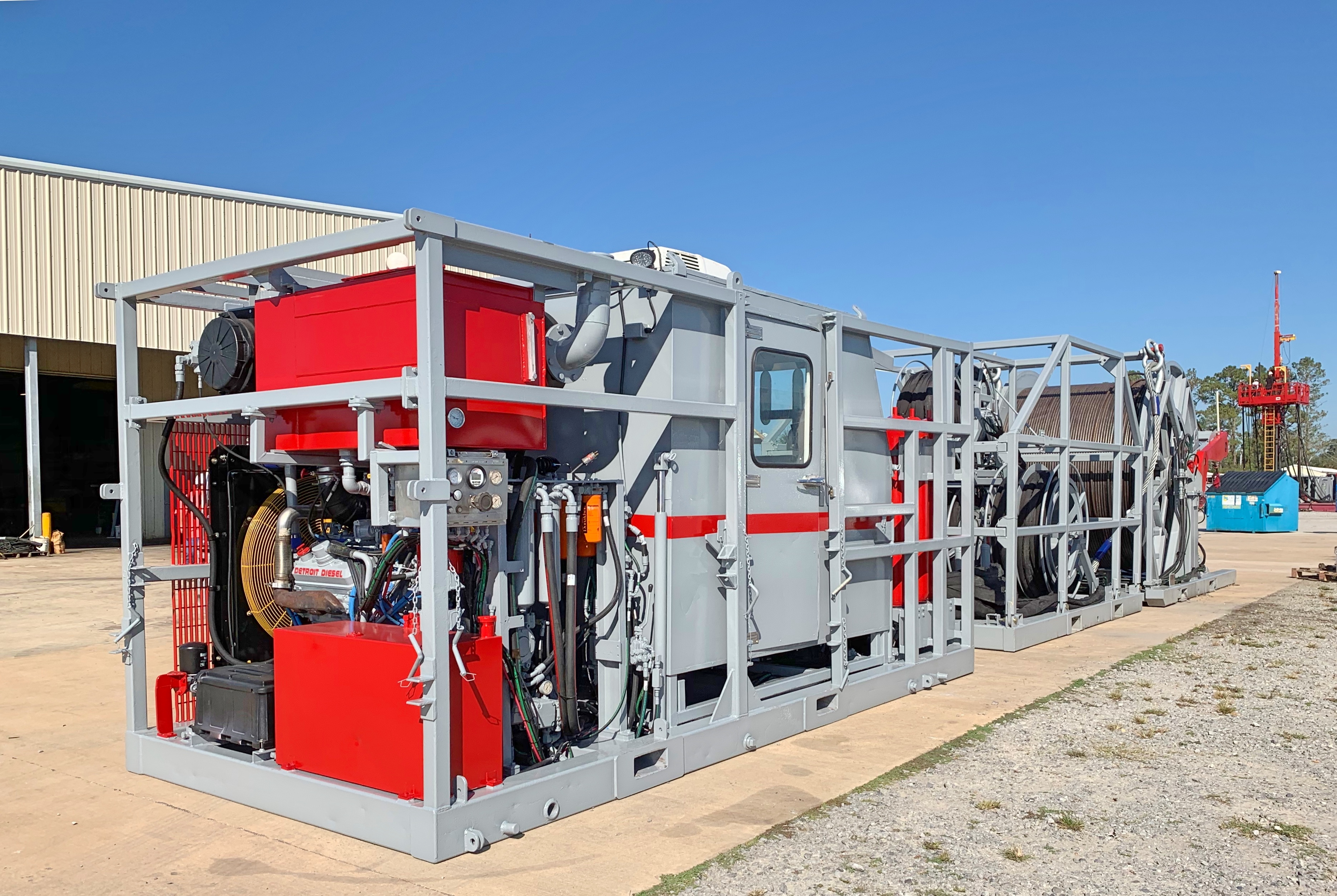
Coiled Tubing Unit with the "pockets" visible at the bottom of unit

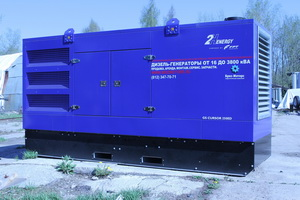
Side view of a skid mounted diesel generator with the "pockets" visible at the bottom of unit
