= Purple-K =

Dry chemical used to suppress fires

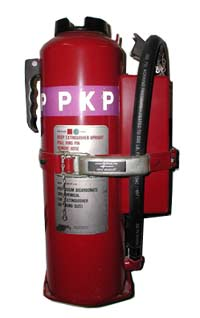

Purple-K, also known as PKP, is a dry-chemical fire suppression agent used in some dry-chemical fire extinguishers. It is the second most effective dry-chemical in fighting class B (flammable liquid) fires after Monnex (potassium allophanate), and can be used against some energized electrical equipment fires (USA class C fires). It has about 4–5 times more effectiveness against class B fires than carbon dioxide, and more than twice that of sodium bicarbonate. Some fire extinguishers are capable of operation in temperatures down to −54 °C or up to +49 °C. Dry chemicals work by directly inhibiting the chemical chain reaction which forms one of the four sides of the fire tetrahedron (heat + oxygen + fuel + chemical chain reaction = fire). To a much smaller degree it also has a smothering effect by excluding oxygen from the fire. Dry-chemical extinguishers, such as Purple-K, are different from dry-powder extinguishers that are used to fight Class D (flammable metal) fires.

Purple-K was developed by the United States Naval Research Laboratory in 1959, as an improvement over sodium bicarbonate for extinguishing oil and gasoline fires. It was named due to the characteristic lavender tint imparted to flames, owing to the potassium (chemical symbol K) content.

== Characteristics ==
Purple-K powder has an acrid taste and odor, is free-flowing and non-abrasive, floats on most liquids, does not wet with water, and is compatible with most foam concentrates. It is violet to distinguish it from other dry agents. Its components are potassium bicarbonate (78–82% by weight), sodium bicarbonate (12–15%), mica (1–3%), Fuller's earth (1–3%), and amorphous silica (0.2–%), and methyl hydrogen polysiloxane (0.2–1%) for hydrophobicity.

Purple-K is normally non-toxic, but ingestion of a large amount can cause alkalosis.

== Uses ==
Purple-K is commonly used in oil refineries, airport ramps, service stations, military facilities, naval warships, power plants, and other places where large volumes of flammable liquids are handled. It is often paired with foam in twin agent systems, usually found fitted to airport fire appliances.

Purple-K is used in many forms, from small handheld fire extinguishers to large mobile and stationary units, including fixed-nozzle piping systems.

Cleanup of spent agent can be difficult, as it forms a residue when discharged. If the spent agent is dry it can be removed by suction, but when combined with water, hydrocarbons and other liquids, it forms a thick crusty scum that can be challenging to remove.

Purple-K should never be mixed with phosphate-based fire suppression agents (ABC dry chemical), as the resulting chemical reaction will destroy its efficiency.
