= APW =

APW may refer to:

- Air pressurized water, a type of fire extinguisher
- All Points West Music & Arts Festival, held in Jersey City, New Jersey
- All Pro Wrestling, a professional wrestling promotion
- Angiosperm Phylogeny Website, dedicated to research on flowering plants
- AP World History, a college-level course offered to high school students
- Arrow Air, a former American cargo airline (ICAO code APW)
- Faleolo International Airport, Apia, Samoa (IATA code APW)
- People's Provincial Assembly, the political body governing the provinces of Algeria
- Western Apache language, identified in ISO 639-3 as apw
- Applied Power Wisconsin, (previously part of the Olin Corporation)
