= Tucsonans for a Clean Environment =

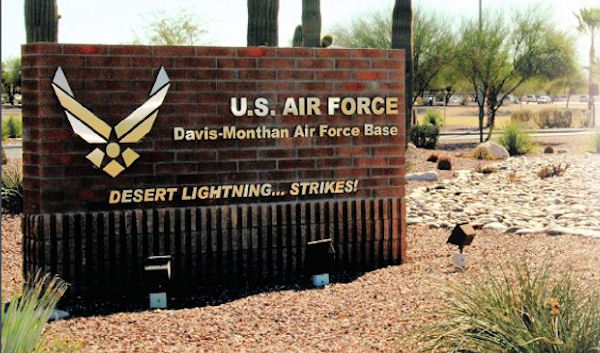
Davis Monthan Air Force Base's main entrance sign

Tucsonans for a Clean Environment (TCE) is an environmental activism group that was founded in 1985 on the predominantly Latino south side of Tucson, Arizona. Residents of the area sought to bring attention to illnesses linked to contaminated groundwater near Davis Monthan Air Force Base.

Tucsonans for a Clean Environment was a majority Latino based environmental activism group located in southern Tucson that advocated for proper water treatment, government intervention, restoration of natural resources, and justice for those who were exposed to groundwater contamination. The group was led by environmental leaders including Rose Marie Augustine.

== Tucson's military industry ==
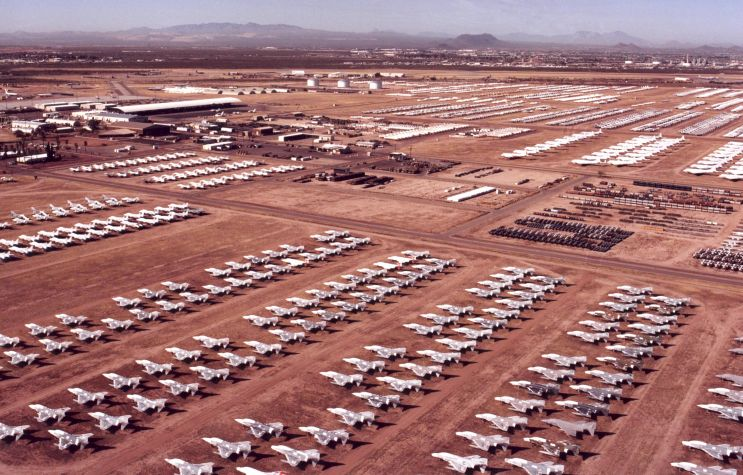
Davis Monthan's boneyard, located west of Kolb Road, with planes covering an area of 2,600 acres

Tucson, Arizona has been home to Davis Monthan Air Force Base since 1925, where dry weather conditions are optimal to restore, maintain, and hold aircraft. Davis Monthan is home to the largest aircraft boneyard in the world, with nearly 4,000 military planes being stored on 2,600 acres of land just five miles south of downtown Tucson.

The Tucson International Airport (TUC) was established in 1919 and opened to public airway in 1928. Tucson's airport has a notable military presence on site, containing the Morris National Air Guard Base (Air Force Plant 44). Morris is one of the largest Air National Guard wings in the country, and shares runways, fire control measurements and security with the public airport.

Several aircraft plants such as Hughes Aircraft (now known as Raytheon Missile Systems Co.) maintained their airplanes at Davis Monthan as well as the Tucson International Airport during World War II and well into the Cold War, however the solvents that they used to degrease aircraft were not recognized as toxic until the 1970s. Since 1952, Hughes Aircraft regularly used trichloroethylene, a widely used degreasing solvent, to clean aircraft parts, and regularly disposed of used solvents by pouring these chemicals into pits, pouring it on the ground into the desert, and dumping it in drains until the early 1980s. In 1981, studies conducted by the Pima County Health Department displayed serious levels of contamination of soil and water sources found on the south side of Tucson. All known polluted water wells were quickly closed, and in 1982 the United States Environmental Protection Agency added the Tucson Airport Authority to a Superfund national priority list.

== Environmental health impact ==
Polyfluorinated alkyl substances (PFA) are synthetic chemicals that are used in many daily household items and are used in the automotive, aircraft, and aerospace industries. They are primarily utilized for their heat tolerance and water/grease resistance. Examples of items that contain PFAs include nonstick cookware, food storage bags, water-resistant clothing, and cosmetics. PFA usage has been widely controversial for decades. While they are extremely useful for certain industries, PFAs have been linked to an increase of an individual's risk of developing cancer or other autoimmune diseases. High levels of illnesses on the south side of Tucson were recognized in the 1970s, however contaminated groundwater from the solvents used by aircraft companies were not suspected as the cause until years later.

PFAs were found at concentrations of 70 particles per trillion (ppt) were found in Tucson's groundwater. The regulated amount nationally is 10 ppt, indicating a significant heightened amount in Tucson's water supply.

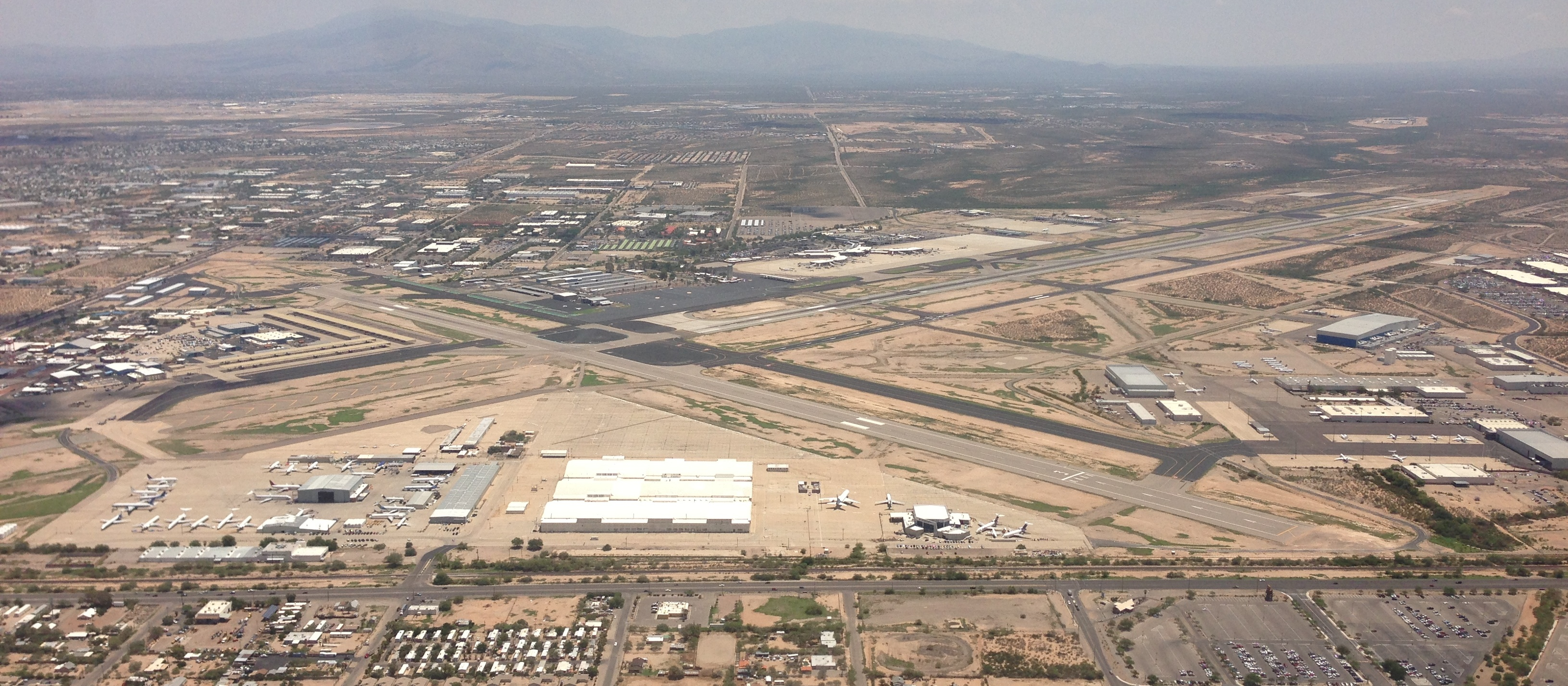
Tucson International Airport (TUC) from the sky. The notable dirt area on the upper lefthand side is Davis Monthan Air Force Base. 5 miles by half a mile surrounding the area have been affected by trichloroethylene and PFA contamination for decades.

There continues to be services providing free screenings for leukemia, lymphoma, and multiple myeloma to individuals living in South Tucson.

== Community advocacy ==
Through advocacy for anti-discriminatory legislation and action taken by the government, Tucson's water restoration project has been an ongoing project for the last 30 years.

In 1989, the city of Tucson entered a lawsuit involving 1,600 south side residents and settled with a payout of $35 million. In 1991, Hughes Aircraft along with several other aircraft plants were sued for $84.5 million by 1,600 plaintiffs. In 1998, Hughes Aircraft, which was now known as Raytheon Missile Systems Co., along with other firms, settled a lawsuit involving 247 affected residents in the area. Two of these cases are still pending in federal court to this day. In 2006, the final insurers agreed to the plaintiffs' attorney's conditions, and settled the suit, pushing the total payout to over $130 million.

== Tucson's remediation projects ==
In 1994, the Tucson Area Remediation Project (TARP) was launched. Levels of trichloroethylene significantly reduced, however the use of PFAs was not restricted and levels increased over time to an unsafe level again. Firefighting foam containing PFAs were used at the Air National Guard Base at the Tucson International Airport until 2018, however the direct cause of the increased PFA levels has not yet been determined in court. Between 2017 and 2021, PFA levels in Tucson's groundwater increased to 700%. In 2021, TARP was closed temporarily due to its inability to properly restore the water-chemical level to a safe level. 60,000 residents began receiving their drinking water from the Colorado River. In May 2022, TARP reopened, and after treating water for PFAs, it is then dumped into the Santa Cruz River. The water that had been treated at TARP for almost 20 years is no longer served as drinking water to the residents of Tucson.

The Santa Cruz River has not reached downtown Tucson in over 70 years, and what once was the most lush mesquite forest in the world that fostered the growth and success of the Tohono O'odham tribe, has dried out throughout the decades. Hydrologists and representatives of Tucson Water predict that the redirection of wastewater into the Santa Cruz River will foster a more tolerable environment for greenery to grow around the urban city.

As of 2024, South Tucson is still listed as a national Superfund site by the Environmental Protection Agency, and restoration and cleanup is still an ongoing process.
