= Foam path =

Aviation safety practice, deprecated

A foam path is the now-discouraged aviation safety practice of spreading a layer of fire suppression foam on an airport runway prior to an emergency landing. Originally, it was thought this would prevent fires, but the practice is no longer recommended.

The U.S. FAA recommended foam paths for emergency landings beginning in 1966, but withdrew that recommendation in 1987, although it did not bar its use. In 2002, a circular recommended against using pre-foaming except in certain circumstances. In particular, the FAA was concerned that pre-foaming would deplete firefighting foam supplies in the event they were needed to respond to a fire. Also, foam on the runway may decrease the effectiveness of the landing airplane's brakes, possibly leading to it overshooting the runway. Starting in the early 2000's, the environmental risk of certain firefighting foams began to be recognized, providing another reason against the practice.

Foam is still used in aviation firefighting, usually in conjunction with Purple-K dry chemical.

== Examples ==
An example of this practice being used in an emergency is LOT Polish Airlines Flight 16. The aircraft experienced a hydraulic failure that prevented the pilots from extending the landing gear, prompting them to perform a belly landing.

This technique was also used during the ditching of Pan Am Flight 6 in 1956 to "mark the […] ditching path and heading."
