= FedEx Express Flight 1376 =

2023 aviation accident in Tennessee

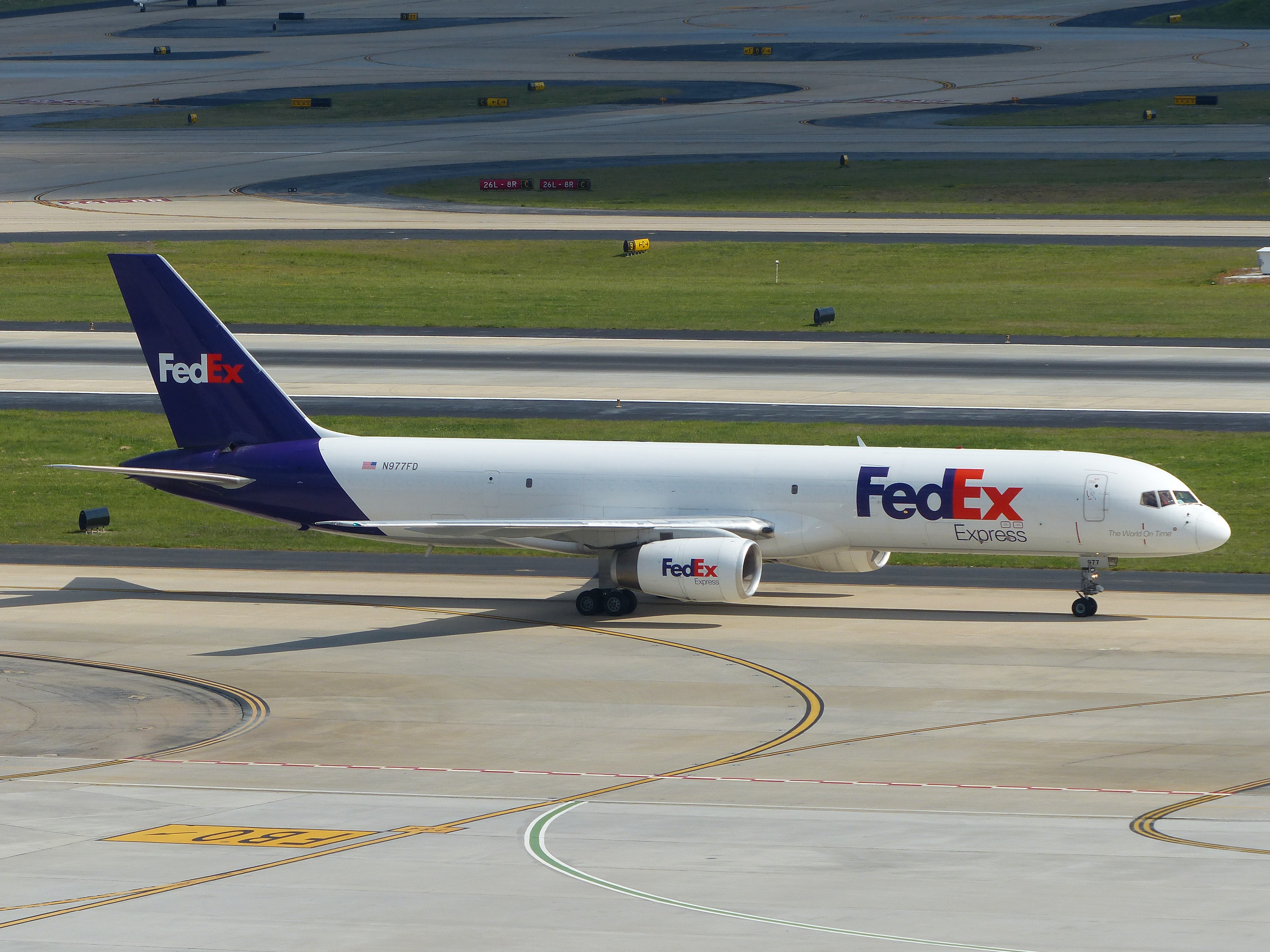
- N977FD, the aircraft involved in the accident, photographed in 2018

Accident
- Date: October 4, 2023
- Summary: Belly landing due to landing gear failure caused by a broken wire
- Site: Chattanooga Metropolitan Airport, Tennessee, United States; 35°02′7.7″N 85°12′15″W

Aircraft
- Aircraft type: Boeing 757-236 (SF)
- Aircraft name: Gatten
- Operator: FedEx Express
- IATA flight No.: FX1376
- ICAO flight No.: FDX1376
- Call sign: FEDEX 1376
- Registration: N977FD
- Flight origin: Chattanooga Metropolitan Airport, Tennessee, United States
- Destination: Memphis International Airport, Tennessee, United States
- Occupants: 3
- Passengers: 1
- Crew: 2
- Fatalities: 0
- Injuries: 0
- Survivors: 3

On October 4, 2023, FedEx Express Flight 1376, a Boeing 757-236 (SF) operating a scheduled domestic cargo flight from Chattanooga Metropolitan Airport, Tennessee, to Memphis International Airport, Tennessee, made an emergency belly landing at Chattanooga Metropolitan Airport due to a system failure. All three people on board survived. The investigation into the accident found that a broken wire had caused the gear failure.

== Background ==
=== Aircraft ===
The aircraft involved in the accident was a Boeing 757-236 (SF) registered as N977FD, and manufactured in 1988. The aircraft was named Gatten.

=== Occupants ===
On board the aircraft at the time of the accident there were three people, two pilots and one off-duty crew member flying as a passenger. The captain was 41 years old; he had a total of 393 flight hours on this aircraft model. The first officer was 53 years old and had a total of 1651 flight hours on the 757-200.

== Accident ==
The aircraft, which was said to have no maintenance issues, was scheduled to depart from Chattanooga Metropolitan Airport, Tennessee, bound for Memphis International Airport, Tennessee. Takeoff went as planned, but as the landing gear and flaps were retracted, a "FLAPS DISAGREE" alarm appeared in the cockpit, as well as other warnings. The crew started a checklist to solve the issue, but at the same time the left hydraulics system's quantity of fluid and pressure fell to zero. After this other failure, the pilot decided to turn back to Chattanooga.

On approach, the crew attempted to lower the landing gear, but the automated systems of the aircraft notified them that it failed to extend; multiple unsuccessful attempts to forcibly lower the gear were made, but failed, while the plane circled the airport numerous times, burning fuel.

At this point, the crew decided to perform a low pass over the runway at Chattanooga, so that the tower operators could confirm if the gear was actually lowered or not. The procedure was performed, and as it was confirmed that the gear was not extended, a go around was executed. The pilots decided to attempt a belly landing, so the ATC cleared runway 20, and the crew started the approach procedure. The aircraft touched down at 11:47 pm local time, bounced slightly, and then traveled all of the runway's distance, until it overran it and impacted localizer antennas. The airplane came to a stop in grassy soil short of a road, about 820 feet (250 m) from the runway end, and was safely evacuated by all three crew members. No large fire ensued after the crash-landing, but only small ones in the engines.

== Investigation ==
The National Transportation Safety Board (NTSB) launched an investigation into the accident and published a final report in 2025. The investigation found that the landing gear failure had occurred due to a broken wire, whose condition prevented the alternate extension power pack from receiving hydraulic fluid, and subsequently made both the main landing gear and the nose gear impossible to extend. The wire was thought to have broken during an overload event. The report also noted some issues with the aircraft door, which made evacuation more difficult.

== Aftermath ==
Chattanooga Metropolitan Airport remained closed for the night of October 4, and reopened the morning of the following day, disrupting some flights.

Aviation experts praised the actions of the pilots of Flight 1376, describing them as "very professional" and "heroic", stating that they were an example of good crew resource management.

== See also ==
- LOT Polish Airlines Flight 16, a Boeing 767 that made a safe belly landing in Poland in 2011
- Eagle Airways Flight 2300, a Beechcraft 1900 that made a safe belly landing in New Zealand in 2007
