= Compressed air foam system =

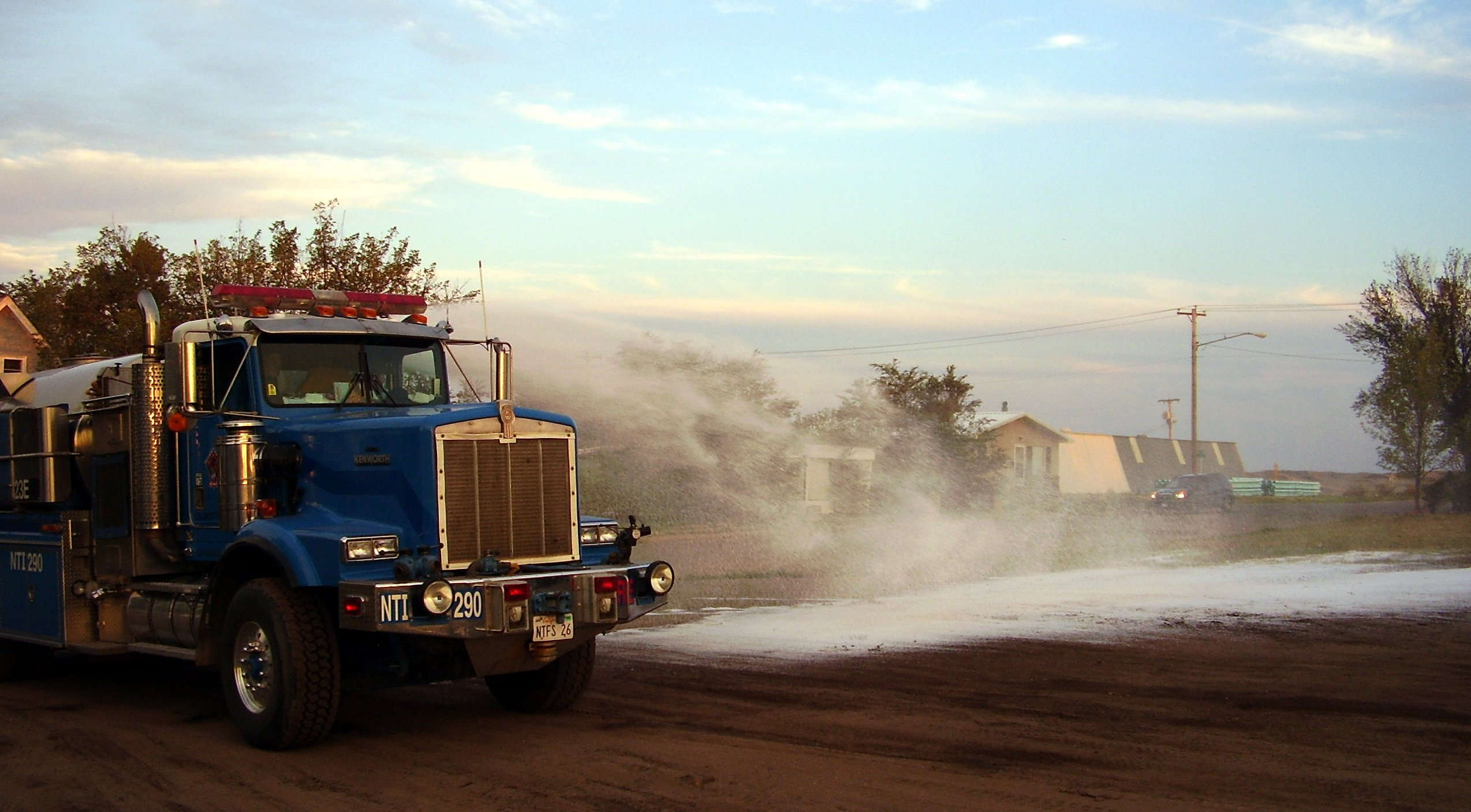
A fire engine using CAFS to make foam on the ground

A compressed air foam system is used in firefighting to deliver fire retardant foam for the purpose of extinguishing a fire or protecting unburned areas.

Typical components include a water source, a centrifugal pump, foam concentrate tanks, a direct-injection foam proportioning system on the discharge side of the pump, a mixing chamber or device, a rotary air compressor, and control systems to ensure the correct mixes of concentrate, water, and air.

== Description ==
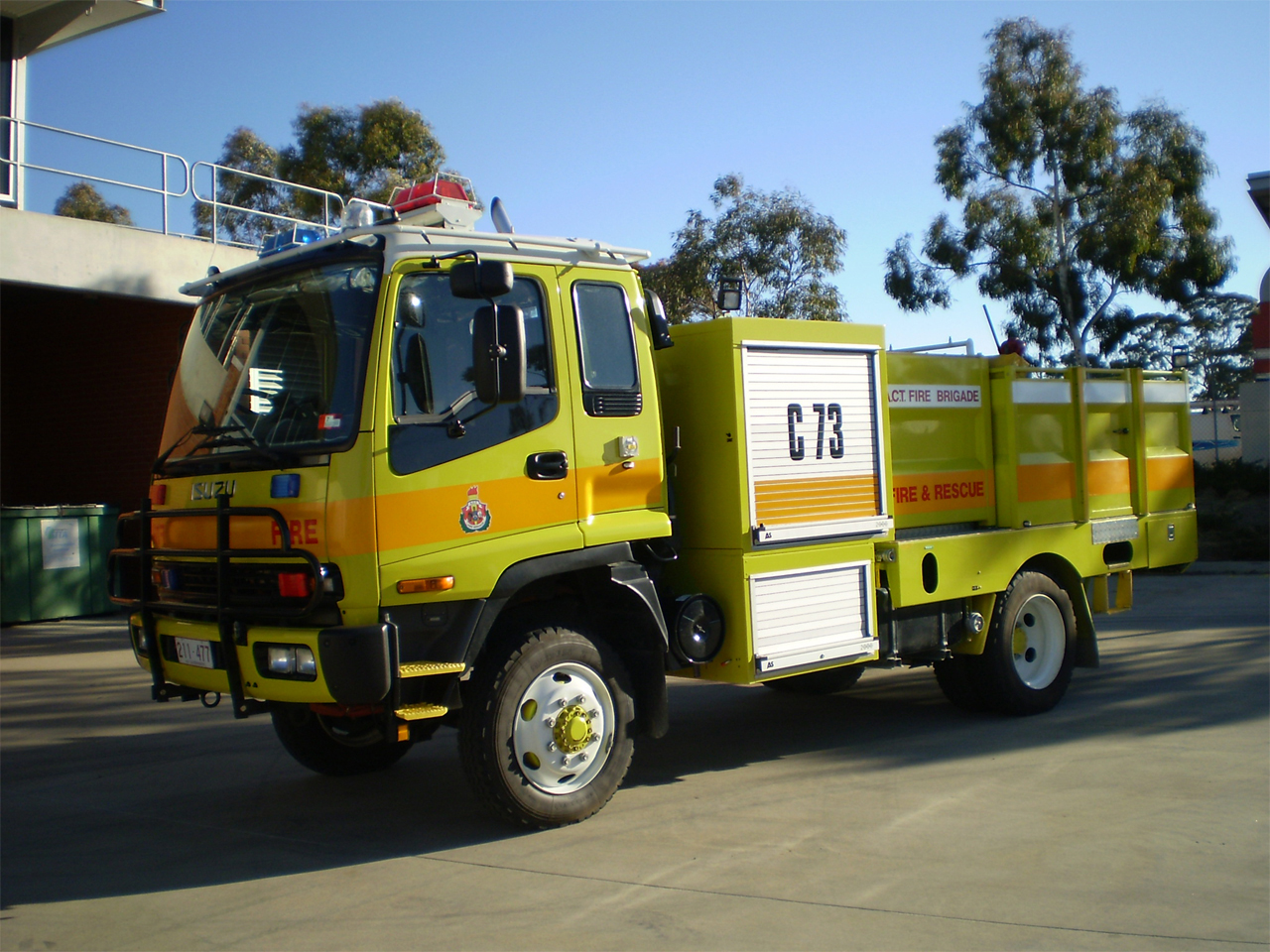
A CAFS tanker from the Australian Capital Territory (ACT) Fire and Rescue service

A compressed air foam system is defined as a standard water pumping system that has an entry point where compressed air can be added to a foam solution to generate firefighting foam for delivery through a monitor or nozzle. This is one of several methods used for foam generation throughout the world, including inline eductors.

The intent of CAFS is to attack all three sides of the fire triangle simultaneously. The foam blankets the fuel, thereby reducing the fuel's capacity to seek a source of oxygen. Due to the surfactant properties of foam, the CAFS solution has a lower surface tension when compared to water. This allows the solution to form a thin coating on the surface of any fuel it is applied to, more readily aiding in rapid reduction in heat.

CAFS may also refer to any pressurized water style extinguisher that is charged with foam and pressurized with compressed air.

Some experts believe that CAFS is no more effective at extinguishing interior fires than regular water and may actually be detrimental to interior attacks. CAFS operations rely on air, which is part of the fire triangle, and this may cause an increase in fire intensity as well as producing excess steam which could endanger firefighters.

== History ==
The idea that water is not a perfect tool for fire extinguishment has been long noted, as by W. E. Clark (1991), "The process of extinguishing fire by water is cumbersome and generally costly … the cost of installing water mains large enough for required flow, the installation and maintenance of fire hydrants, and the acquisition and maintenance of fire department pumpers, fire hose, and nozzles, make water a fairly expensive extinguishing agent … the use of water is hardly the ideal way to extinguish fire … there must be a better method waiting to be discovered." (p. 75)

Liebson (1996) adds, "Water is an inefficient extinguishing agent. It requires the use of large quantities at costs both financial and physical. These costs are imposed on the firefighter and the community." (p. 5)

The use of foam additives to water for extinguishment dates back to an English patent in 1877 for a method to produce chemical foam (Liebson, 1991, p. xi). The Royal Navy experimented with agents foamed by means of compressed air in the 1930s (Darley, 1994) and the United States Navy was using compressed air foam systems (CAFS) in the 1940s for flammable liquid fires. By the 1960s do-it-yourself car washes were using CAFS with low pressure and small-diameter hoses and nozzles, which flowed about 4 US gallons (15 L) per minute of solution and 4 cubic feet (0.11 m^{3}) per minute of compressed air, with a nozzle reach of about 40 feet (12 m) (Rochna and Schlobohm, 1992).

In the mid-1970s Mark Cummins, while working for the Texas Forest Service, developed a water expansion system known as the Texas Snow Job. Mr. Cummins invented the CAFS and was issued the US Patent 4318443 in 1982. This pioneering Class A CAFS used dish-washing detergents or a pine soap derivative, which was readily available as waste from local paper manufacturing industries, as a foaming agent mixed as 8 to 9 parts agent to 91 to 92 parts water, flowing up to 30 US gal (110 L) per minute. The duration was limited by the use of compressed air cylinders rather than compressors (The US and foreign patent issued to Mark Cummins also included all types of air compressors and inert gas generators). By the mid-1980s, research by the United States Bureau of Land Management in co-operation with Mark Cummins, led to modern design features of rotary air compressors, centrifugal pumps, and direct-injection foam-proportioning systems (Fornell, 1991; IFSTA, 1966). CAFS received national attention in 1988 during the Yellowstone Park wildfires when the four-story Old Faithful Inn was successfully protected by blanketing it with compressed air foam (Darley, 1994).

In the spring of 1994, a compressed air foam demonstration vehicle manufactured by W.S. Darley & Co., was driven from coast to coast in North America by Troy Carothers. The purpose was to spread the word about CAFS and display this relatively new technology to United States and Canadian firefighting services. Many years earlier Darley Co. teamed up with Cummins on the WEPS (water expansion pumping system) demonstration vehicle. The 1994 Darley demo vehicle was operated by Troy Carothers who was involved with the initial design and assembly of the Darley AutoCAFS product. Carothers is now the Darley AutoCAFS Manager and oversees all aspects of CAFS development for Darley Co. This demonstration vehicle concept has continued annually since 1994.

== Foam types ==
CAFS is able to deliver a range of useful foam consistencies, labeled from type 1 (very dry) to type 5 (wet), which are controlled by the air-to-solution ratio, and, to a lesser extent, by the concentrate-to-water percentage. Type 1 and 2 foams have long drain times, meaning the bubbles do not burst and give up their water quickly, and long duration. Wet foams, such as type 4 and 5, drain more quickly in the presence of heat.

A major advantage of using CAFS is having the unique ability to produce a wide range of foam qualities or foam types to provide the most appropriate foam response to individual fire situations. This gives the fire officer the advantage of custom tailoring the best foam type for the tactical use and fire problem at hand..

After testing a dry type 2 foam in several situations, Johnny Murdock notes, "The emerging consensus is that the dryer foams (type II; maybe type I) should be used to suppress vapors, protect unburned structures, build wildland fire lines involving unburned fuels; … and that structural fire suppression requires a wetter foam (type IV or type V); and that both structural and wildland overhaul require type V foam."

For structural firefighting with compressed air foam, Dominic Colletti recommends utilizing a 0.5 cubic feet (0.014 m^{3}) per minute to 1 US gal (3.8 L) per minute "air to foam solution" ratio, with a 0.5% class A foam proportioning rate. This would produce flow rates from a typical 1-3/4" inch hose of 120 US gal (450 L) per minute of foam solution and 60 cu ft (1.7 m^{3}) per minute of compressed air. This air to foam solution ratio produces a wet, quick draining finished foam that will quickly knockdown flame and reduce fire compartment temperature. This ratio also allows for a higher relative foam solution (liquid) flow rate to help maintain the highest levels of firefighter safety possible. (The Compressed Air Foam Systems Handbook, Colletti 2005.)

While Colletti's claims for flows are not agreed upon by many industry experts, as exhibited at the CAFS symposium held in Rosenberg, Texas in February 2007. A panel there agreed that flows of 1 US gal (3.8 L) per minute foam solution in tandem with 1 cu ft (0.028 m^{3}) per minute air produce the most effective blanket. It was further agreed that the maximum combination of air flow mixed with foam solution flow out of a 1-3/4" line under normal pump pressures of 100–125 PSI could not physically exceed a total of 140–150. In other words, the simultaneous flow of 70 cu ft (2.0 m^{3}) per minute of air and 70 US gal (260 L) per minute of water is approaching the maximum limit or carrying capacity of that diameter hose (1.75 inches). (Texas CAFS Symposium February, 2007)

== Water can conversion ==
Air pressurized water (APW) fire extinguishers are commonly converted into makeshift CAFS extinguishers by drilling two 1/8-1/16 inch holes in the pickup tube above the water line. The unit is then filled with 1.5 US gallons (5.7 L) of water and class A foam, AFFF, FFFP or commercial detergent is added to the water in a 1% ratio for class A fires and a 3%-6% ratio for class B fires. Typically, the tip of the smooth-bore application nozzle is then cut off to allow the foam to properly expand. Keeping the nozzle will result in wetter foam but longer range. Cutting the nozzle will result in an expanded, dry foam but will lack the range of the standard water nozzle. CAFS extinguishers can also be fitted with air aspirators, commonly used on AFFF and FFFP foam extinguishers, which will result in a more expanded foam but will lack the heat resistance of non-aspirated foam, which does not break the bubbles.

== Problems ==
On 17 December 2005 two firefighters from Tübingen, Germany, died inside a burning building when one of the hoses inside the building burst and they were left without extinguishing agent. In the following reconstruction of the tragedy, experts were surprised to find out that CAFS filled hoses are more likely to burst under heat because the foam is unable to cool the hoses sufficiently.

All fire hose types are susceptible to hose bursts and ruptures which can and have resulted in injury and deaths to firefighters. Annual hydrostatic hose testing is required to ensure hose lines can withstand static pressures for a prescribed timeframe. Testing of fire hose for thermal resistance to interior heat conditions is not part of testing criteria and should be considered as anecdotal evidence in fires where hose line failure occurs. Gerald Hughes, Battalion Chief (retired), Chicago FD
