= Aleksandr Loran =

Russian inventor (1849–c.1911)

- Born: Aleksandr Georgievich Loran; 1849; Kishinev, Bessarabia Governorate, Russian Empire (now Moldova)
- Died: c. 1911; Saint Petersburg, Russian Empire
- Other names: Александр Григорьевич Лоран; Alexander Laurant; Aleksandr Lovan; Aleksandr Lavrentyev
- Education: Saint Petersburg Polytechnical Institute
- Occupation: Teacher
- Notable work: Fire fighting foam; Foam extinguisher

Aleksandr Georgievich Loran, also known as Aleksandr Lovan or Aleksandr Lavrentyev, Alexander Laurant (Russian: Александр Георгиевич Лоран;French: Alexandre G. Laurent; 1849 – c. 1911) was a teacher and inventor of fire fighting foam and foam extinguishers. He lived in the Russian Empire.

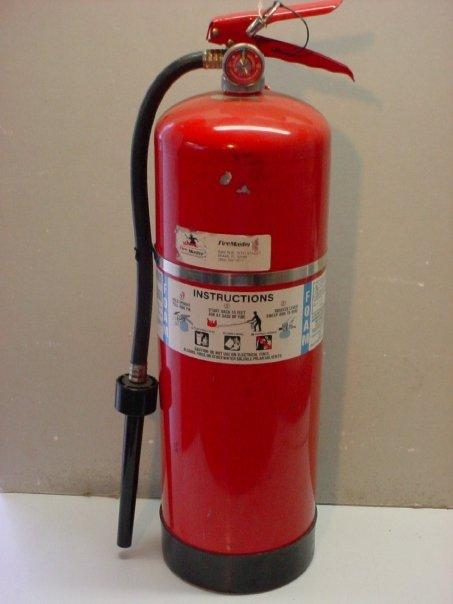
A modern foam fire extinguisher.

He was born in 1849 in Kishinev, Russian Empire (now Moldova). After graduating from the Saint Petersburg Polytechnical Institute, he continued his education in Paris, where he studied chemistry.

Returning to Russia, Loran became a teacher in a school in Baku, which was the main center of the Russian oil industry at that time. Impressed by the terrible and hardly extinguishable oil fires that he had seen there, Loran tried to find such a liquid substance that could deal effectively with the problem. He invented fire fighting foam, which was successfully tested in several experiments in 1902-1903. In 1904 Loran patented his invention, and developed the first foam extinguisher the same year.

Subsequently, he founded a company called Eurica, based in Saint Petersburg, and started to sell his fire extinguishers under that brand.

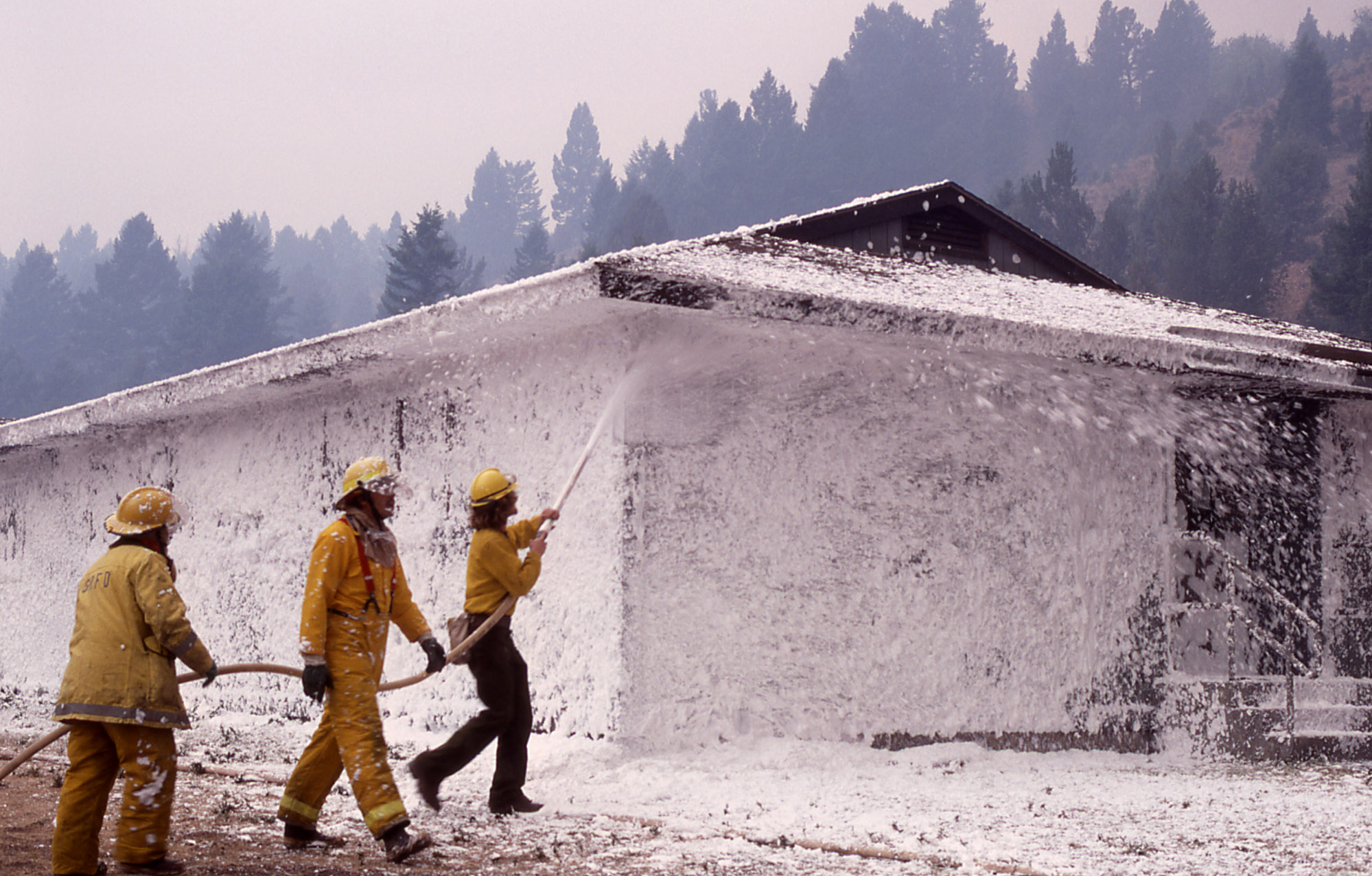
Modern usage of fire fighting foam.

== See also ==
- List of Russian inventors
