= Air pressurized water =

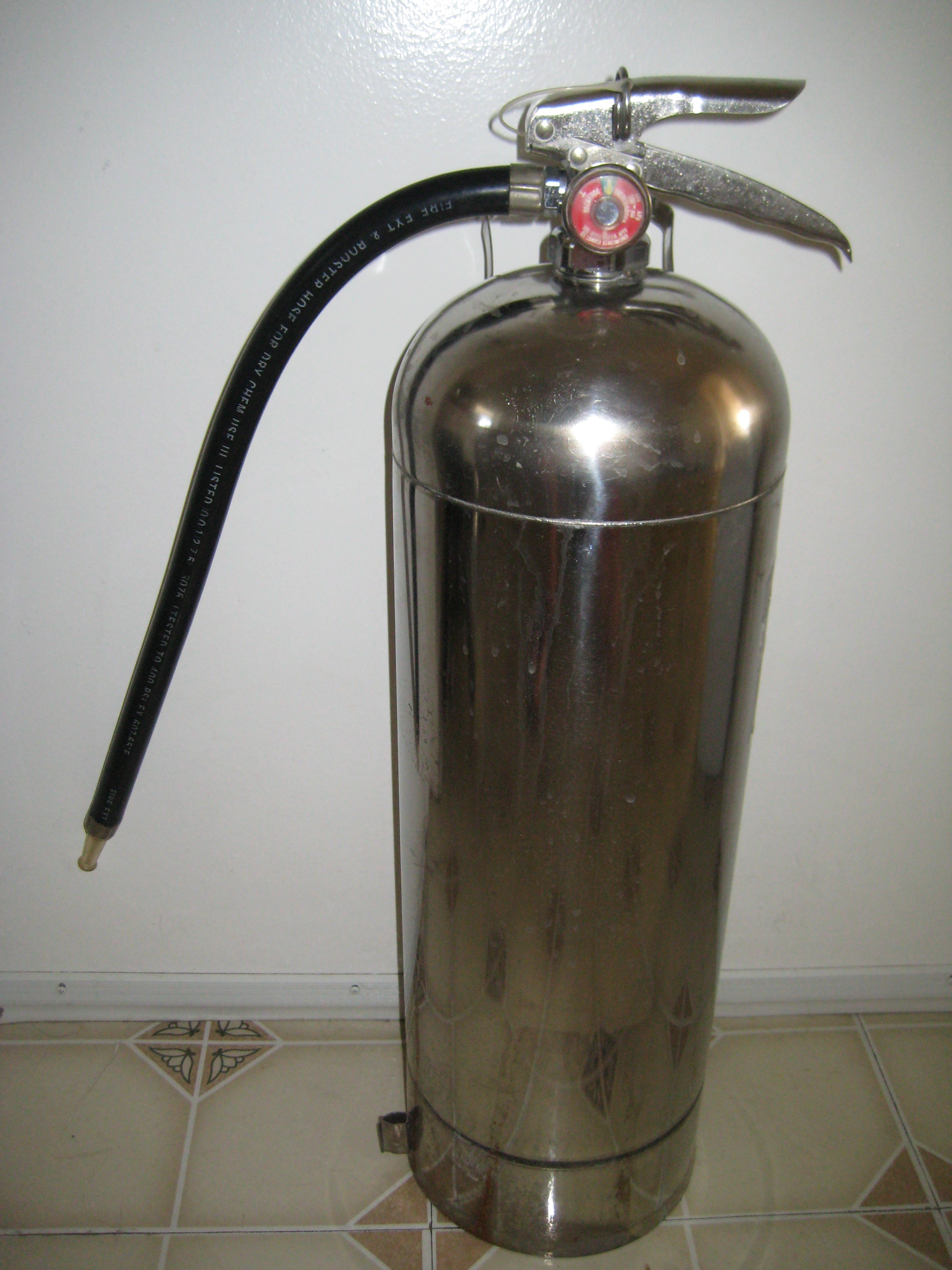
A typical American APW extinguisher

Air pressurized water (APW) extinguishers are a type of fire extinguisher that use ordinary water (H_{2}O) to suppress fire. The water is propelled by ordinary air (atmosphere), pressurized in the extinguisher. They are also known by the slang term water can. Although only effective on Class A fires, they have the advantages of being inexpensive to build and maintain, and leaving no special chemical residue when used.

== Construction ==
A standard APW extinguisher in the United States contains 9.5 litres (2.5 US gal) of water in a stainless steel tank. The water is discharged by means of a 13 mm (1/2 in) hose, with a smooth-bore nozzle attached to the tip. They will initially produce a 12–15 m (40–50 ft) stream of water, with a discharge time of about 50 seconds.

APW extinguishers are easily refilled by unscrewing the top and filling the cylinder with water about three-quarters of the way up. The top is then screwed back on, and the unit is pressurized with an air compressor via the Schrader valve located on the back of the main valve body.

== Conversion to foam ==
APW extinguishers are commonly converted into makeshift CAFS extinguishers by drilling two 1.6–3.2 mm (1/16–1/8 in) holes in the pickup tube. The unit is then filled with 5.7 litres (1.5 US gal) of water and Class A foam, aqueous film forming foam (AFFF), film-forming fluoroprotein (FFFP) or commercial detergent is added to the water in a 1% ratio for class A fires and a 3–6% ratio for Class B fires. Typically, the tip of the smooth-bore application nozzle is then cut off to allow the foam to properly expand. Keeping the nozzle will result in wetter foam and longer range. Cutting the nozzle will result in an expanded, dry foam but will lack the range of the standard water nozzle. Water extinguishers can also be fitted with air aspirators when used with foam (commonly used on AFFF and FFFP foam extinguishers) which will result in a more expanded foam but will lack the durability or heat resistance of compressed air foam.
