= Rose Marie Augustine =

American environment activist

Rose Marie Augustine is an American environmental justice activist from Tucson, Arizona. In 1985, she helped found the group Tucsonans for a Clean Environment (TCE) to raise awareness about groundwater pollution in the South Side of Tucson, which disproportionately affected low-income and Hispanic neighborhoods.

== Pollution in Tucson ==
In 1981, the Pima County Health Department closed seven wells in the South Side of Tucson that were found to have been contaminated with trichloroethylene (TCE). This contamination was later attributed to the use of TCE by Hughes Aircraft Co. for cleaning aircraft parts, and then dumping the chemical into Tucson's water beginning in the 1950s. In 1983, the Environmental Protection Agency added the Tucson International Airport Area to its Superfund site list due to groundwater pollution. However, Pima County and Tucson city officials denied the contamination posed a threat to the health of residents. In 1985, the Pima County Health director, Patricia Nolan, blamed residents' health on their lifestyle of bad diets, smoking, and drinking. Officials also denied that the TCE levels in the water reached 5 parts per billion, the amount at which the EPA recommends a shut-down; some wells on the South Side were eventually found to have 920 times this amount.

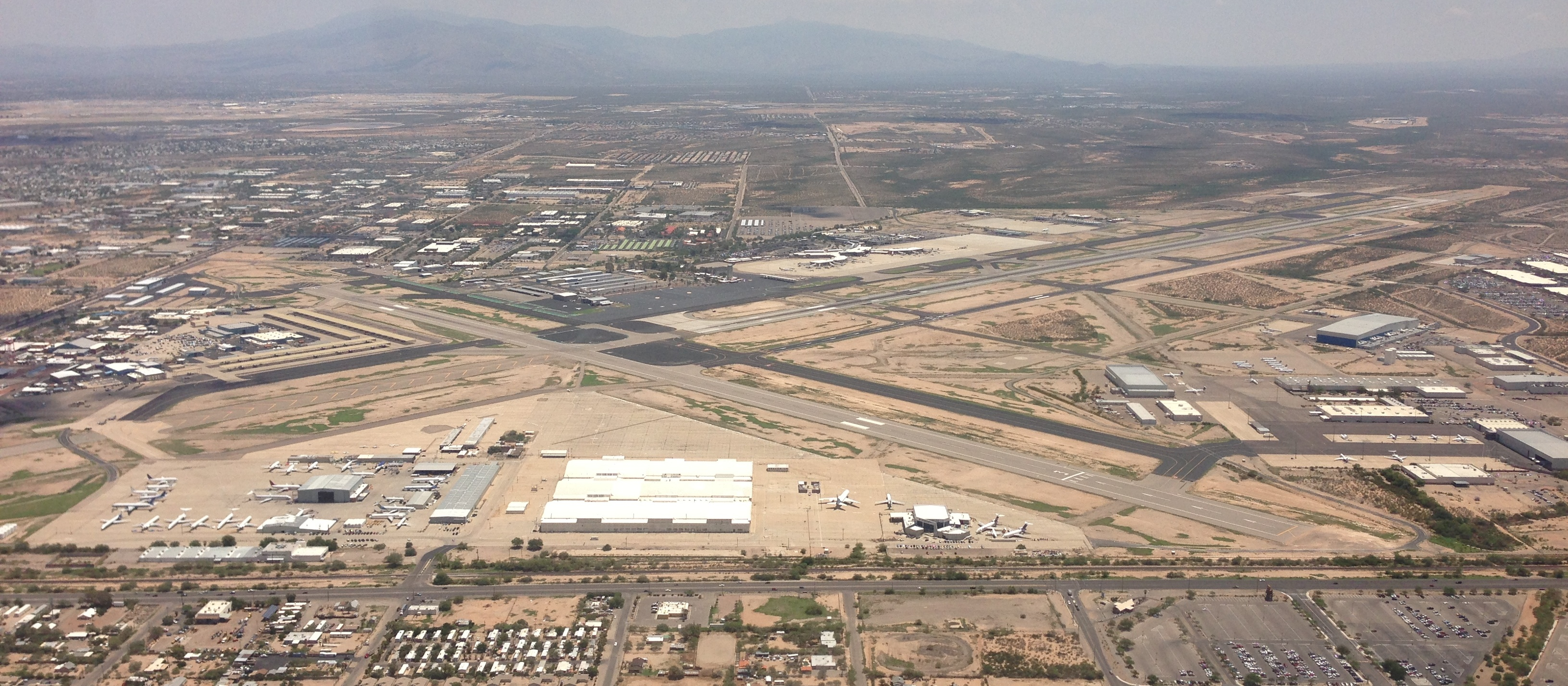
Tucson International Airport from above, 2013

As of 2024, the Environmental Protection Agency still lists the Tucson International Airport Area as a Superfund cleanup site.

== Activism ==
In May of 1985, Rose Marie Augustine read a series of articles published in the Arizona Daily Star by reporter Jane Kay about contamination of groundwater in the south side of Tucson. This series discussed the history of trichloroethylene (TCE) pollution in the city’s drinking wells and interviewed 500 residents who were suffering from a range of health problems, including cancer in local students. Rose Marie Augustine reported her family suffered from cancer, lupus, and nerve disorders, and that Kay’s articles inspired her to form Tucsonans for a Clean Environment that same year.

Rose Marie Augustine called for greater public awareness of the contamination and health risks of TCE exposure, as well as greater public involvement with government hearings. At one hearing, Augustine and fellow activists were referred to by a local official as “hysterical Hispanic housewives”. Officials denied any illness was caused by the pollution, citing a report by the Arizona Department of Health that blamed illnesses on residents' lifestyles.

As an activist, Rose Marie Augustine called for the Agency for Toxic Substances and Disease Registry to do a new study after this report claimed no illness in Tucson was a result of TCE pollution. She demanded citizens accompany officials to test water, and for samples to be tested independent of the city. She also contributed to the creation of a city-funded clinic to treat Tucson residents with likely TCE-related illnesses. Alongside Tucsonans for a Clean Environment, Rose Marie Augustine joined a lawsuit with 2,000 other Tucsonans against Hughes Aircraft Co., which claimed the company's pollution affected their health. In 1991, officials admitted the toxic waste had caused health issues among Tucson residents, particularly lupus and birth deformities. Hughes Aircraft Co. settled for $85 million but did not accept blame.

In October 1991, Rose Marie Augustine was a speaker at the First National People of Color Environmental Leadership Summit in Washington, D.C. This summit was an important moment for the growing environmental justice movement, separating it from traditional environmental activism.

Rose Marie Augustine also joined several environmental activist groups, including Citizens Clearinghouse for Hazardous Waste, the National Toxics Campaign, and the Southwest Network for Environmental and Economic Justice.

== See also ==
- List of Superfund sites in Arizona
