= Tadeusz Wrona (aviator) =

Polish pilot (born 1954)

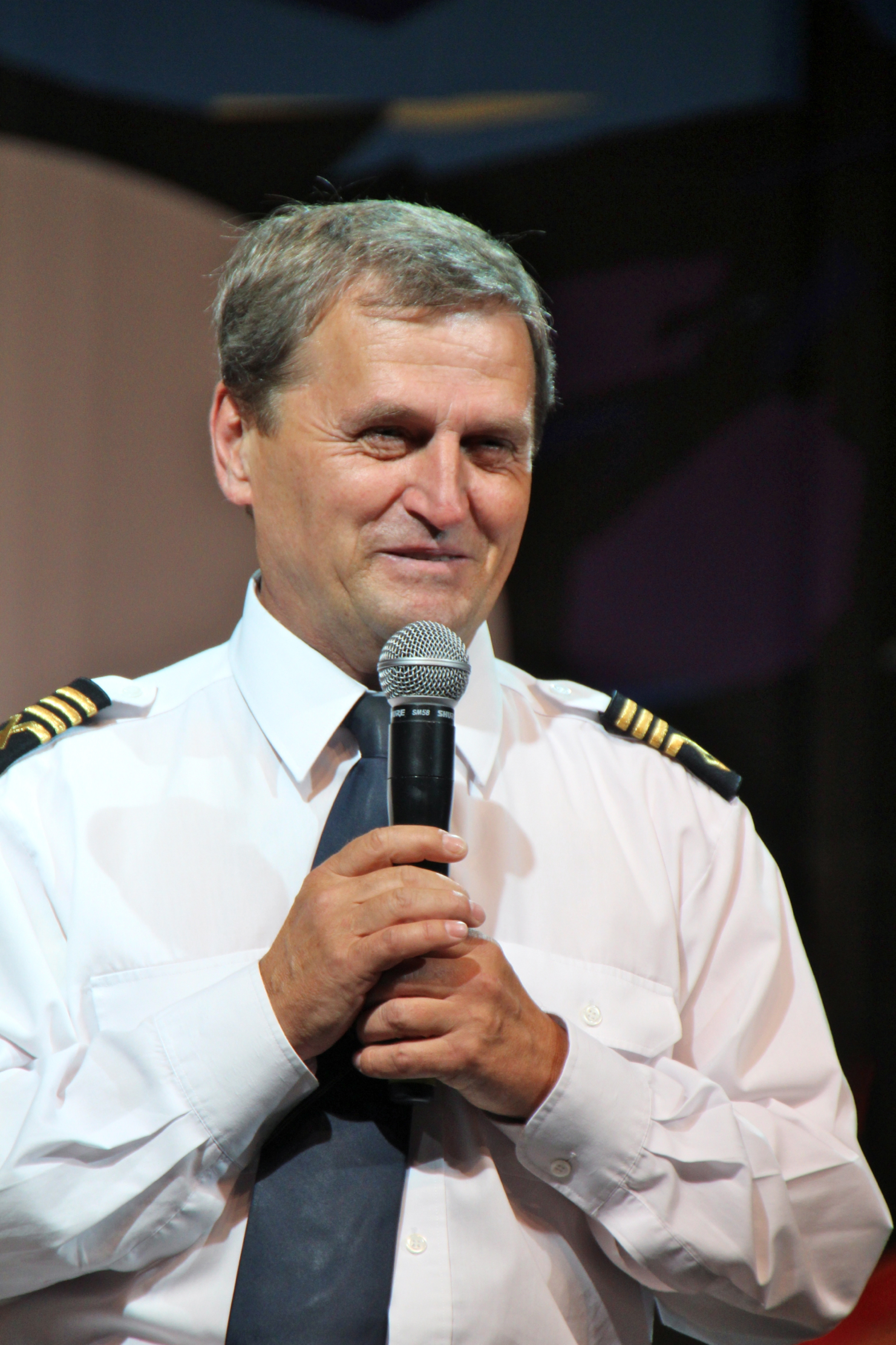
- Tadeusz Wrona (2012)
- Born: Tadeusz Wrona; April 16, 1954 (age 72); Żywiec, Poland
- Citizenship: Polish
- Years active: 1984–2019
- Known for: Captain of LOT Polish Airlines Flight 16, which he successfully performed a belly landing of a Boeing 767 at the Chopin Airport in Warsaw, Poland.
- Spouse: Marzena Wrona
- Children: Natalia Wrona, Mikołaj Wrona
- Awards: Order of Polonia Restituta (Officer's Cross), FAI Gliding Commission diamond badge
- Aviation career
- Famous flights: LOT Polish Airlines Flight 16

Tadeusz Wrona (born April 16, 1954 in Żywiec) is a Polish retired pilot who successfully performed a belly landing of LOT Polish Airlines Flight 16, a Boeing 767 at Chopin Airport in Warsaw on November 1, 2011. None of the 231 passengers and crew were injured.

== Award ==
On November 7, 2011, Wrona was awarded the Order of Polonia Restituta, Officer's Cross, one of Poland's highest decorations. His co-pilot, Jerzy Szwarc, was awarded the Order of Polonia Restituta, Knight's Cross. The two honours were bestowed in recognition of their "outstanding achievements in the service of the state and society, and for their professionalism and exemplary attitude in the face of threats to human life." At the Presidential Palace ceremony President Komorowski said that people had watched the landing on a live television broadcast, and he congratulated the pair for achieving a "happy ending to a dramatic incident."

The following week, Wrona was greeted as a hero when he visited a Polish and Slavic center in Brooklyn, New York.

== LOT Polish Airlines Flight 16 ==
A video of the landing was recorded and widely broadcast in the international media. Wrona was described as a hero in Polish and International media and by the Polish president Bronislaw Komorowski. Komorowski spoke to Wrona shortly after the incident, and announced that state decorations were to be given out to Wrona and the rest of the flight crew. In subsequent interviews Wrona downplayed his role in the event. After the event internet fan websites, including Facebook, were established to celebrate his accomplishment, many of which included a pun on his name, "Fly like an eagle, land like a crow" ("wrona" means "crow" in Polish).

He was compared to Chesley Sullenberger who successfully ditched US Airways Flight 1549 in the Hudson River on January 15, 2009, also without any serious injuries. Sullenberger himself, in a CNN interview, congratulated Wrona and stated that this might have been the first emergency landing of its kind.

== Personal life ==
Wrona also holds a diamond badge for gliding awarded by the Aeroklub Ziemi Lubuskiej (Lubusz Land Air Club). He is married to Marzena Wrona. They have two children; a daughter, Natalia Wrona, who is a five-time champion of Poland in eventing, in the junior category, and a son Mikołaj, who was a civilian pilot like his father; Mikołaj Wrona died in 2024 as a result of leukemia
