= Belly landing =

Aircraft landing without landing gear

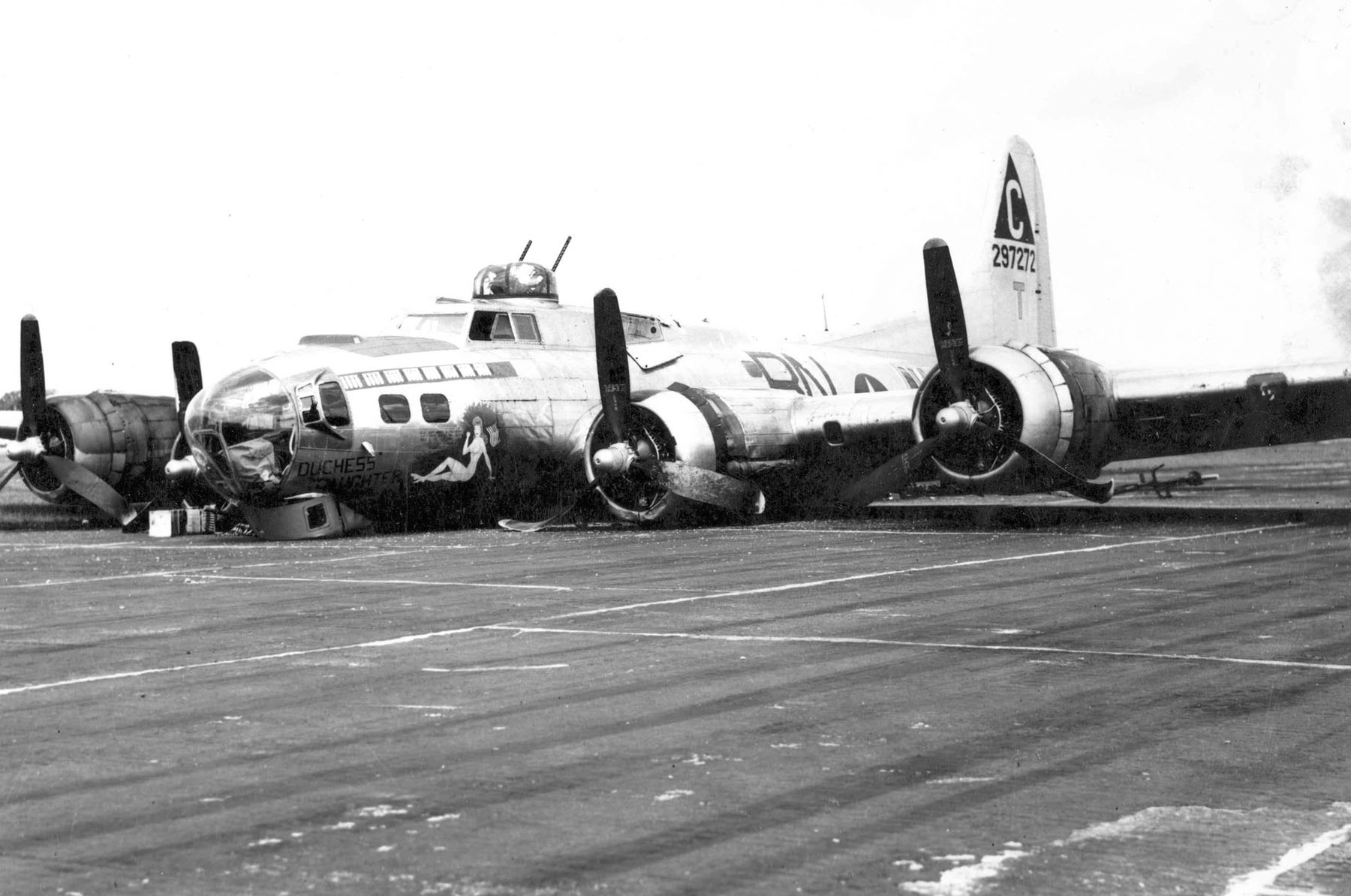
A Boeing B-17, Duchess' Daughter, after a belly landing. (6 July 1944)

A belly landing or gear-up landing occurs when an aircraft lands without its landing gear fully extended and uses its underside, or belly, as its primary landing device. Normally the term gear-up landing refers to incidents in which the pilot forgets to extend the landing gear, while belly landing refers to incidents where a mechanical malfunction prevents the pilot from extending the landing gear.

During a belly landing, there is normally extensive damage to the airplane. Belly landings carry the risk that the aircraft may flip over, disintegrate, or catch fire if it lands too fast or too hard. Extreme precision is needed to ensure that the plane lands as straight and level as possible while maintaining enough airspeed to maintain control. Strong crosswinds, low visibility, damage to the airplane, or unresponsive instruments or controls greatly increase the danger of performing a belly landing. Belly landings are one of the most common types of aircraft accidents nevertheless, and are normally not fatal if executed carefully.

== Causes and prevention ==
=== Pilot error ===
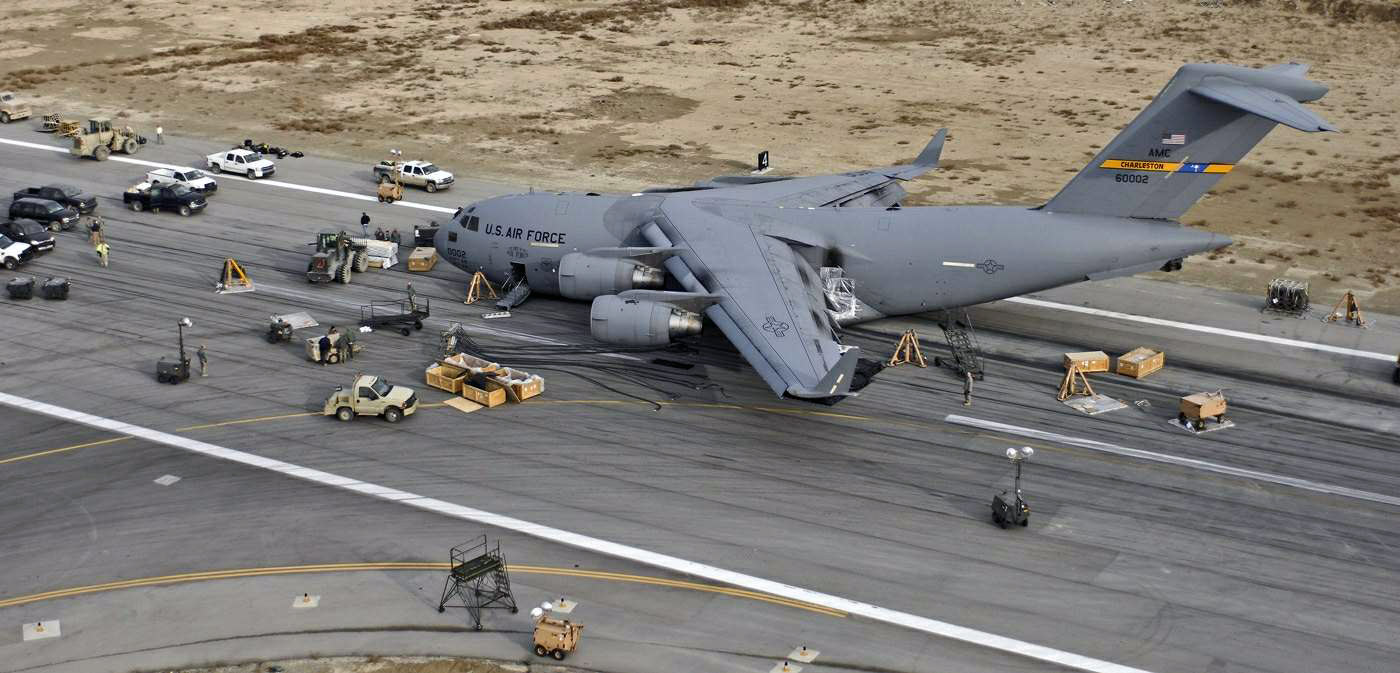
A C-17 Globemaster after a belly-landing at Bagram Airfield, Afghanistan (2009). The cause of this was later determined to be pilot error.

The most common cause of gear-up landings is the pilot simply forgetting to extend the landing gear before touchdown. On any retractable gear aircraft, lowering the landing gear is part of the pilot's landing checklist, which also includes items such as setting the flaps, propeller and mixture controls for landing. Pilots who ritually perform such checklists before landing are less likely to land gear-up. However, some pilots neglect these checklists and perform the tasks by memory, increasing the chances of forgetting to lower the landing gear. Even careful pilots are at risk, because they may be distracted and forget to perform the checklist or be interrupted in the middle of it by other duties such as collision avoidance or another emergency. In the picture shown above, the B-17 Dutchess' Daughter had landed normally, when the copilot inadvertently flipped the landing gear switch to retract. The gear collapsed near the end of the landing roll.

All aircraft with retractable landing gear are required to have a way to indicate the status of the landing gear, which is normally a set of lights that change colors from red to amber to green depending on whether the gear are up, in transit, or down. However, a distracted pilot may forget to look at these lights. This has led to aircraft designers building extra safety systems in the aircraft to reduce the possibility of human error. In small aircraft this most commonly takes the form of a warning light and horn which operate when any of the landing gear is not locked down and any of the engine throttles are retarded below a cruise power setting. However, the horn has been useless in situations when the pilot was unfamiliar with the aircraft and did not know what the horn sounding was meant to indicate. Pilots have sometimes confused the landing gear warning horn with the stall warning horn. In other cases, pilots cannot hear the horn on older aircraft due to wearing a modern noise-canceling headset.

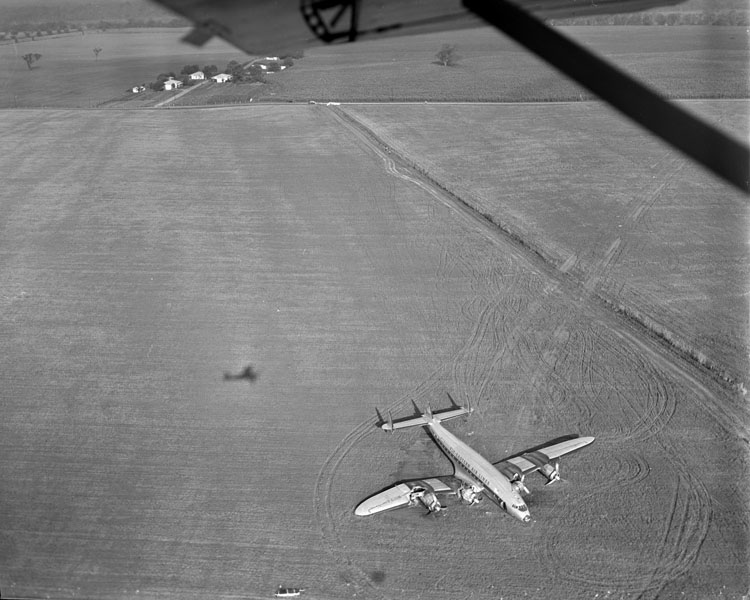
In 1951, Eastern Airlines Flight 601 operated by a Lockheed L-749 Constellation performed a successful belly landing at Curles Neck Farm in Virginia during a storm.

In larger aircraft, the warning system usually excludes the engine power setting and instead warns the pilot when the flaps are set for landing but the landing gear is not. An alternative system uses the ground proximity warning system or radar altimeter to engage a warning when the airplane is close to the ground and descending with the gear not down. Most airliners incorporate a voice message system which eliminates the ambiguity of a horn or buzzer and instead gives the pilot a clear verbal indication: "GEAR NOT DOWN". In addition, large aircraft are designed to be operated by two pilots working as a team. One flies the aircraft and handles communications and collision avoidance, while the other operates the aircraft systems. This provides a sort of human redundancy which reduces the workload placed on any one crew member, and provides for one crew member to be able to check the work of the other. The combination of advanced warning systems and effective crew training has made gear-up landing accidents in large aircraft extremely rare.

In some cases, the pilot may be warned of an unsafe gear condition by the aircraft's flying characteristics. Often very sleek, high-performance airplanes will be very difficult to slow to a safe landing speed without the aerodynamic drag of the extended landing gear.

=== Mechanical failure ===
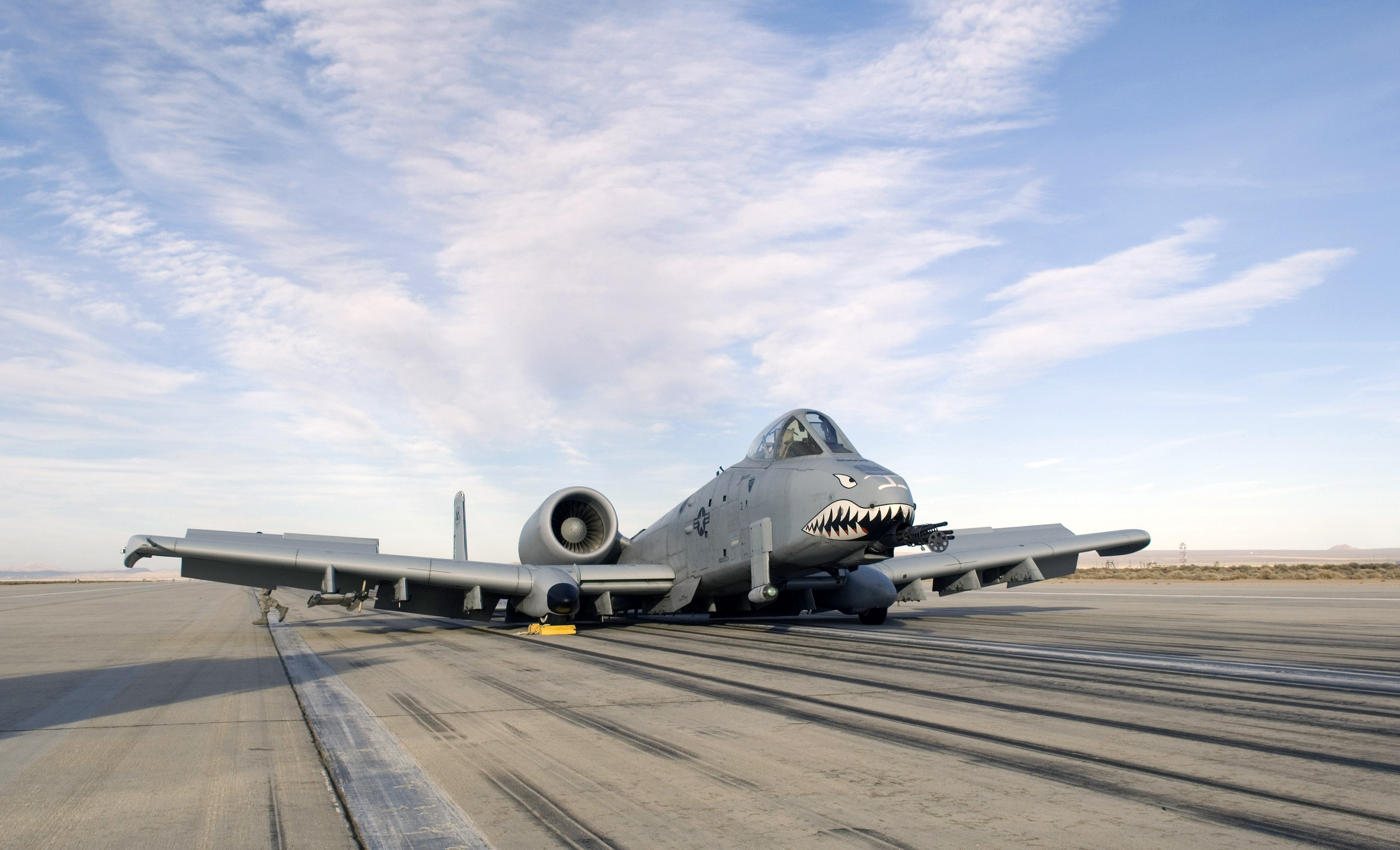
An A-10 after a belly landing at Edwards Air Force Base (2008)

Mechanical failure is another cause of belly landings. Most landing gear are operated by electric motors or hydraulic actuators. Multiple redundancies are usually provided to prevent a single failure from failing the entire landing gear extension process. Whether electrically or hydraulically operated, the landing gear can usually be powered from multiple sources. In case the power system fails, an emergency extension system is always available. This may take the form of a manually operated crank or pump, or a mechanical free-fall mechanism which disengages the uplocks and allows the landing gear to fall and lock due to gravity and/or airflow.

In cases where only one landing gear leg fails to extend, the pilot may choose to retract all the gear and perform a belly landing because they may believe it to be easier to control the aircraft during rollout with no gear at all than with one gear missing.

Some aircraft, like the A-10 Thunderbolt II, are specifically designed to make belly landings safer. In the A-10's case, the retracted main wheels protrude out of their nacelles, so the plane virtually rolls on belly landings.

== Unmanned belly landings ==
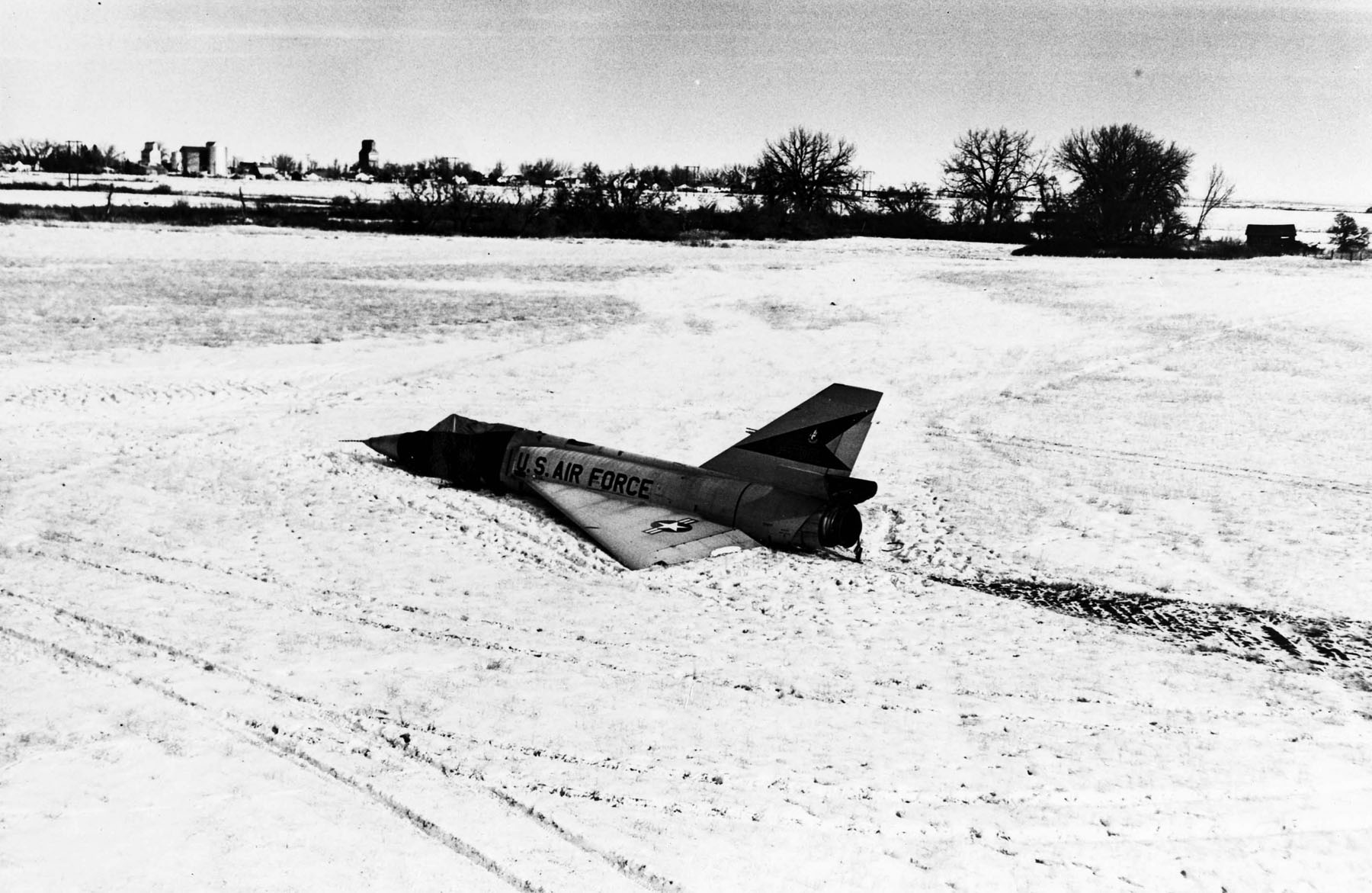
The Cornfield Bomber, prior to recovery from its landing site (1970)

There are examples of aircraft making comparatively successful belly landings after being abandoned by their crew in flight.

A German Junkers Ju 88 bomber, after an attack on Soviet shipping in April 1942, was abandoned by its crew and came down on a hillside at Garddevarre in Finnmark in the far north of Norway. It was recovered in 1988 and is currently displayed at the Norsk Luftfartsmuseum, the Norwegian Aviation Museum at Bodø Airport.

On 27 September 1956 a Bell X-2 experimental aircraft, after establishing an airspeed record of Mach 3.2, landed unmanned in the desert after a series of stalls and glides. It was deemed only superficially damaged, breaking up into three pieces on impact. The pilot had used his escape system at about 40,000 ft (12,000 m) after losing control of the aircraft. He was killed when his capsule hit the desert.

Possibly the most well-known is a United States Air Force Convair F-106 Delta Dart, tail number 58-0787. In February 1970, the aircraft entered a flat spin over Montana. Following the pilot ejecting, the aircraft's spin stabilised, and the Delta Dart proceeded to fly for several miles until it came down in a field near Big Sandy, Montana. The aircraft (later nicknamed the Cornfield Bomber) was repaired and returned to service. After the F-106 was withdrawn from service, the aircraft was presented to the National Museum of the United States Air Force.

== Examples ==
On 29 September 1940, during the 1940 Brocklesby mid-air collision, two Avro Ansons became wedged together after colliding, one on top of the other. Both of the upper aircraft's engines had been knocked out in the collision but those of the one below continued to turn at full power. The pilot of the lower Anson was injured and bailed out, but the pilot of the upper Anson, Leonard Graham Fuller, found that he was able to control the piggybacking pair of aircraft with his ailerons and flaps. He managed to travel 8 kilometres (5 mi) after the collision before making a successful emergency belly landing in a large paddock 6 kilometres (4 mi) south-west of Brocklesby, New South Wales, Australia.

On 13 June 1991, Korean Air Flight 376 (HL7350), a Boeing 727 operating a domestic flight from Jeju to Daegu, performed an unexpected gear-up landing at Daegu. The crew failed to read out the landing procedure checklist and therefore did not select the gear down option. Subsequent investigation revealed that the pilot instructed the co-pilot to pull the fuse case from the warning system because the repeated warnings that the landing gear was not deployed were "irritating and distracting". With the warning horn disabled, the South Korean pilot brought the plane in and slid down the length of the runway on the central structural rib in the belly of the aircraft. There were no serious injuries but the aircraft was written off.

On 4 July 2000, Malév Flight 262, a Tupolev Tu-154, accidentally performed a gear-up touchdown during the landing and skidded on the runway, but was able to take off and land normally after a go-around. No injuries were reported.

On 9 April 2006, a Canadair CL-215 water bomber sold by Buffalo Airways to the Turkish government belly landed on the runway at İzmir Adnan Menderes Airport when the Turkish pilots did not put the landing gear down. The hull was damaged in the crash and there were no injuries, but Buffalo had to fly in new drop doors to replace the ones damaged in the crash.

On 8 May 2006, a United States Air Force B-1 Lancer strategic bomber landed on the atoll of Diego Garcia in the Indian Ocean without lowering its undercarriage. A fire ensued, but was extinguished with only minor personnel injuries. The pilots had reportedly switched off the warning system that would have warned them of the oversight and overlooked the red warning light on the instrument panel throughout the landing. The aircraft, after nearly $8 million in repairs, was returned to service the following year.

On 1 November 2011, LOT Polish Airlines Flight 16, a Boeing 767, Captain Tadeusz Wrona declared an emergency with a loss of landing gear en route from Newark Liberty International Airport to Warsaw Chopin Airport. The aircraft involved was the newest 767 airframe in the fleet. It made a belly landing in Warsaw with a small fire, but all passengers and crew were evacuated with no injuries. The airport was closed for over a day afterwards.

On 22 May 2020, Pakistan International Airlines Flight 8303, an Airbus A320, made a belly landing with landing gear not deployed due to pilot error. Though the crew attempted to perform a go-around, the belly landing had damaged both engines, which failed after the go-around. The plane crashed into a densely populated residential area near Karachi Jinnah International Airport, killing 97 of 99 people aboard, as well as one on the ground.

On 5 October 2023, FedEx Express Flight 1376, a Boeing 757 taking off from Chattanooga Metropolitan Airport headed for Memphis International Airport, was forced to return and conduct a belly landing after its gear was unable to lower. It skidded off the runway, with no injuries to the crew onboard.

On 29 December 2024, Jeju Air Flight 2216, a Boeing 737-800 landing at Muan Airport in South Korea was forced to conduct a belly landing after what some reports currently suggest may have been a landing gear failure following a reported bird strike. The aircraft failed to stop on the runway, hitting a raised earthwork embankment and bursting into flames, killing 179 out of 181 onboard.

On January 27, 2026, N927NA, a Martin/General Dynamics WB-57F Canberra operated by NASA was forced to perform a belly landing at Ellington Field Joint Reserve Base due to a mechanical issue. Both crew members onboard survived with no injuries. The aircraft sustained significant damage, however it is unknown if it will be repaired or not
