= LOT Polish Airlines Flight 16 =

2011 aviation accident in Poland

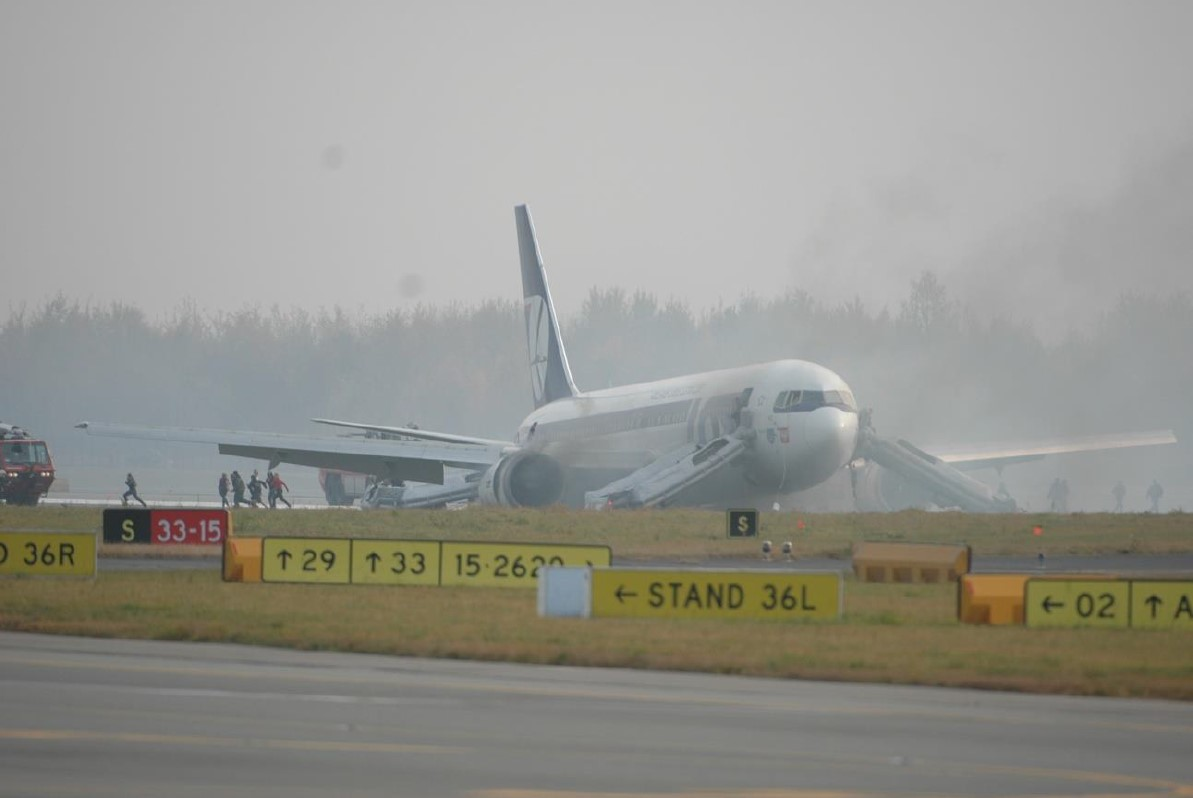
- Evacuation of the aircraft

Accident
- Date: 1 November 2011
- Summary: Landing gear failure leading to belly landing
- Site: Warsaw Chopin Airport, Warsaw, Masovian Voivodeship, Poland; 52°09′56″N 20°58′02″E

Aircraft
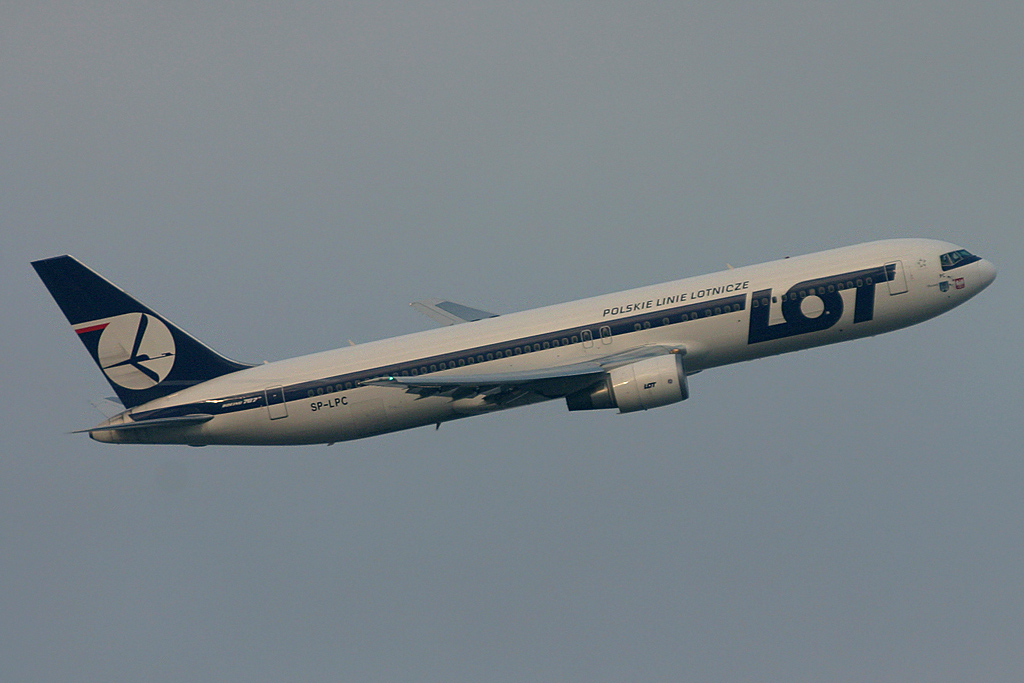
- SP-LPC, the aircraft involved in the accident, seen in 2003
- Aircraft type: Boeing 767-35D(ER) (Note: The aircraft was a Boeing 767-300 Extended Range ("ER") model; Boeing assigns a unique code for each company that buys one of its aircraft, which is applied as an infix to the model number at the time the aircraft is built, hence "767-35D(ER)" designates a 767-300(ER) built for LOT Polish Airlines, which has 5D as its customer code.)
- Aircraft name: Poznań
- Operator: LOT Polish Airlines
- IATA flight No.: LO16
- ICAO flight No.: LOT16
- Call sign: LOT 16
- Registration: SP-LPC
- Flight origin: Newark Liberty International Airport, Newark, New Jersey, United States
- Destination: Warsaw Chopin Airport, Warsaw, Masovian Voivodeship, Poland
- Occupants: 231
- Passengers: 220
- Crew: 11
- Fatalities: 0
- Survivors: 231

LOT Polish Airlines Flight 16 was a scheduled flight from Newark, United States, to Warsaw, Poland. On 1 November, 2011, the Boeing 767 operating the route made a successful gear-up emergency landing at Warsaw Chopin Airport, after its landing gear failed to extend. All 231 people on board (220 passengers and 11 crew) survived without serious injuries. A leak in one of the aircraft's hydraulic systems occurred shortly after takeoff, resulting in the loss of all of the hydraulic fluid supplying the primary landing gear system.

== Aircraft ==
The aircraft involved was a Boeing 767-35DER, registered as SP-LPC, named Poznań, serial number 28656. It was built by Boeing Commercial Airplanes in 1997 and in its 14 years of service, it had logged 85429 airframe hours in 8002 takeoff and landing cycles. The aircraft was powered by two General Electric CF6-80C2B6 engines.

== Incident ==
LOT Polish Airlines Flight 16 was scheduled to arrive at Warsaw Chopin Airport from Newark Liberty International Airport on 1 November 2011 at 13:35 CET with 220 passengers and 11 crew on board.

Within 30 minutes of departing from Newark, the crew received a warning that the center hydraulic system had malfunctioned. The decision was made to continue to Warsaw in order to use up the heavy load of fuel needed for the transatlantic flight. The aircraft proceeded to approach as normal, but aborted when the landing gear failed to deploy.

The crew informed Warsaw air traffic control (ATC) that they were unable to lower the landing gear due to a hydraulic system failure. The captain decided to circle the airport for over an hour, to consume excess fuel and to allow time for ground emergency services to prepare for the landing, including covering the runway with a fire suppression foam. Visual observation by two Polish Air Force F-16 fighter jets verified that none of the landing gear were down; attempts to lower the landing gear by alternative means failed.

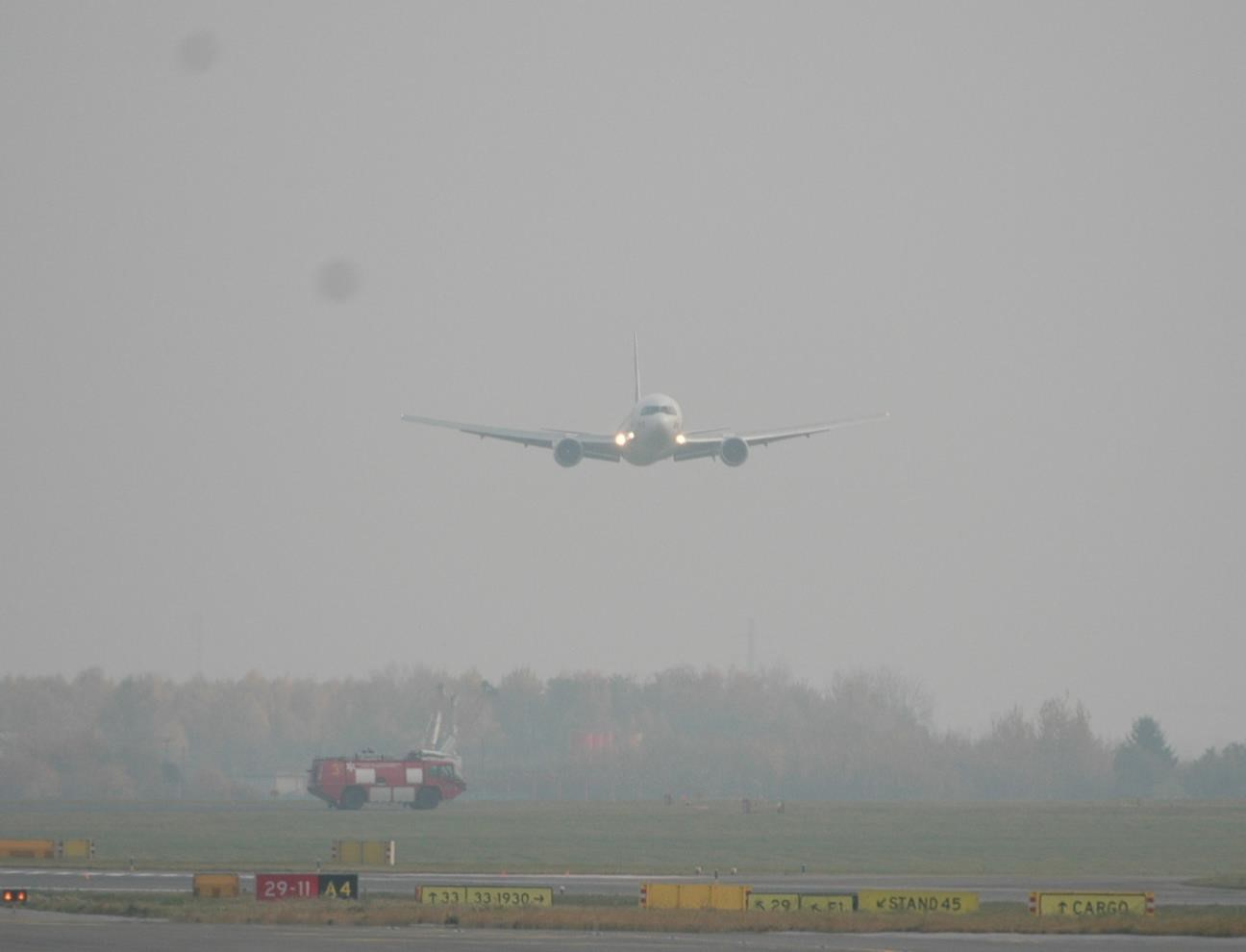
Flight 16, seconds before touchdown

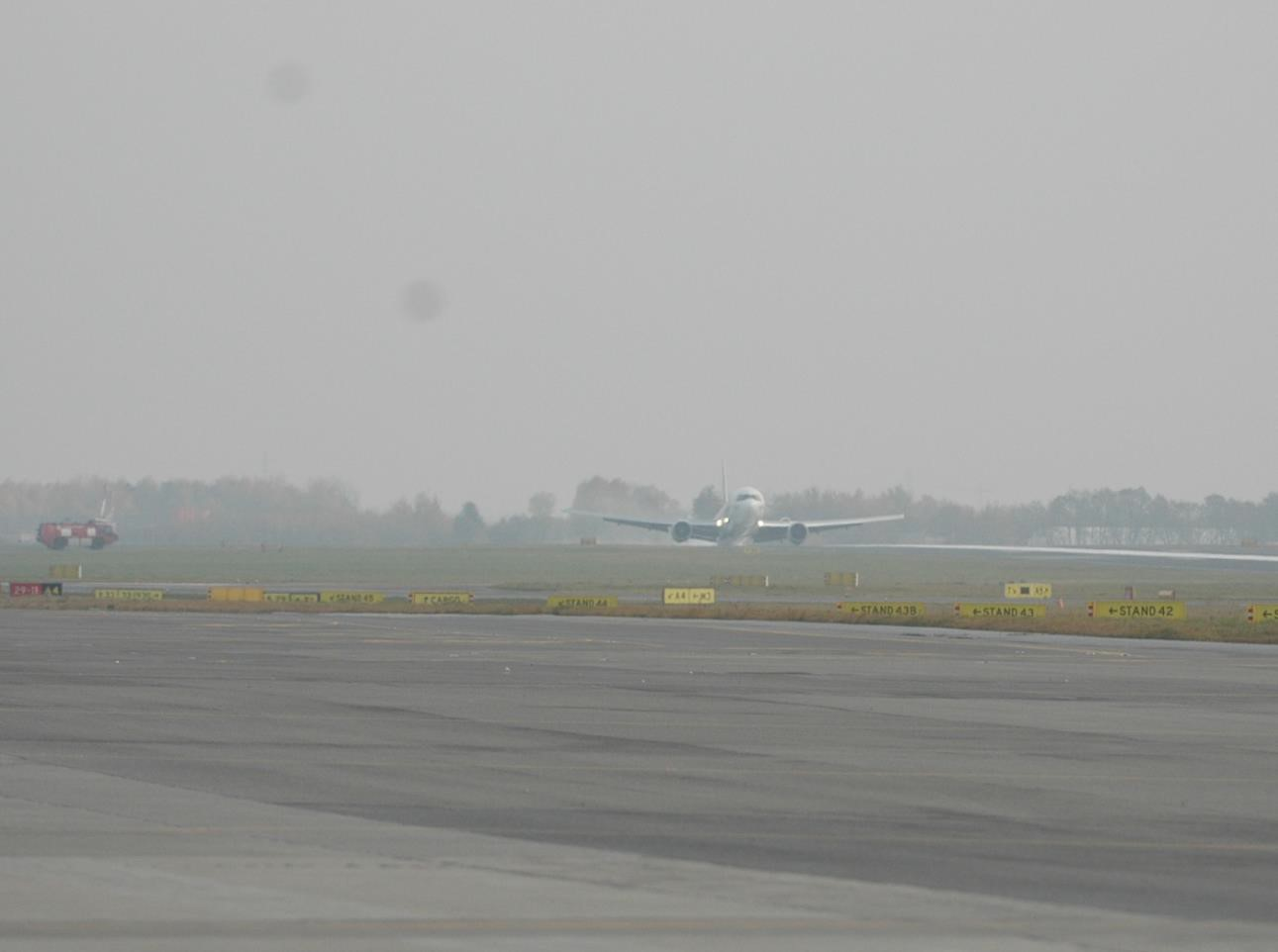
Point of touchdown

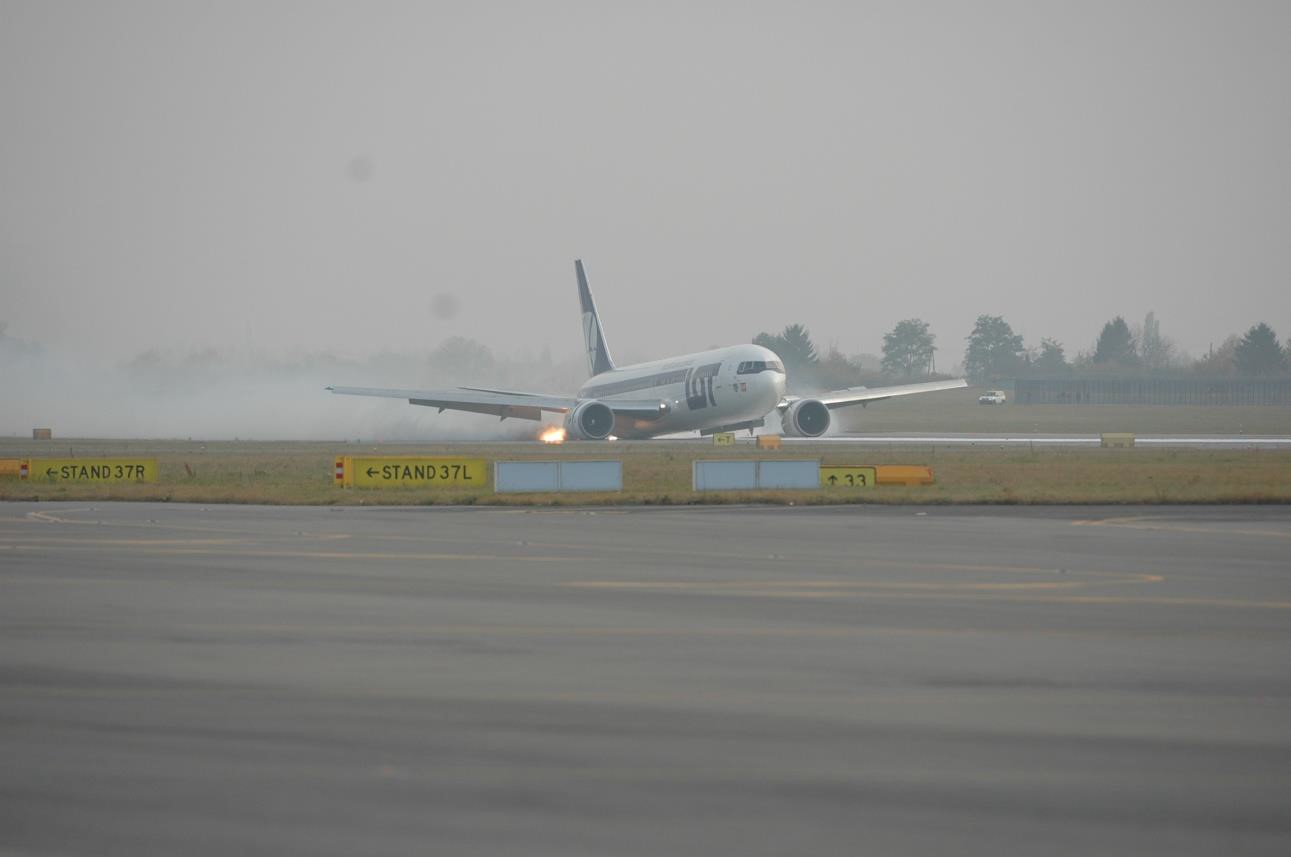
Seconds after touchdown; still at motion

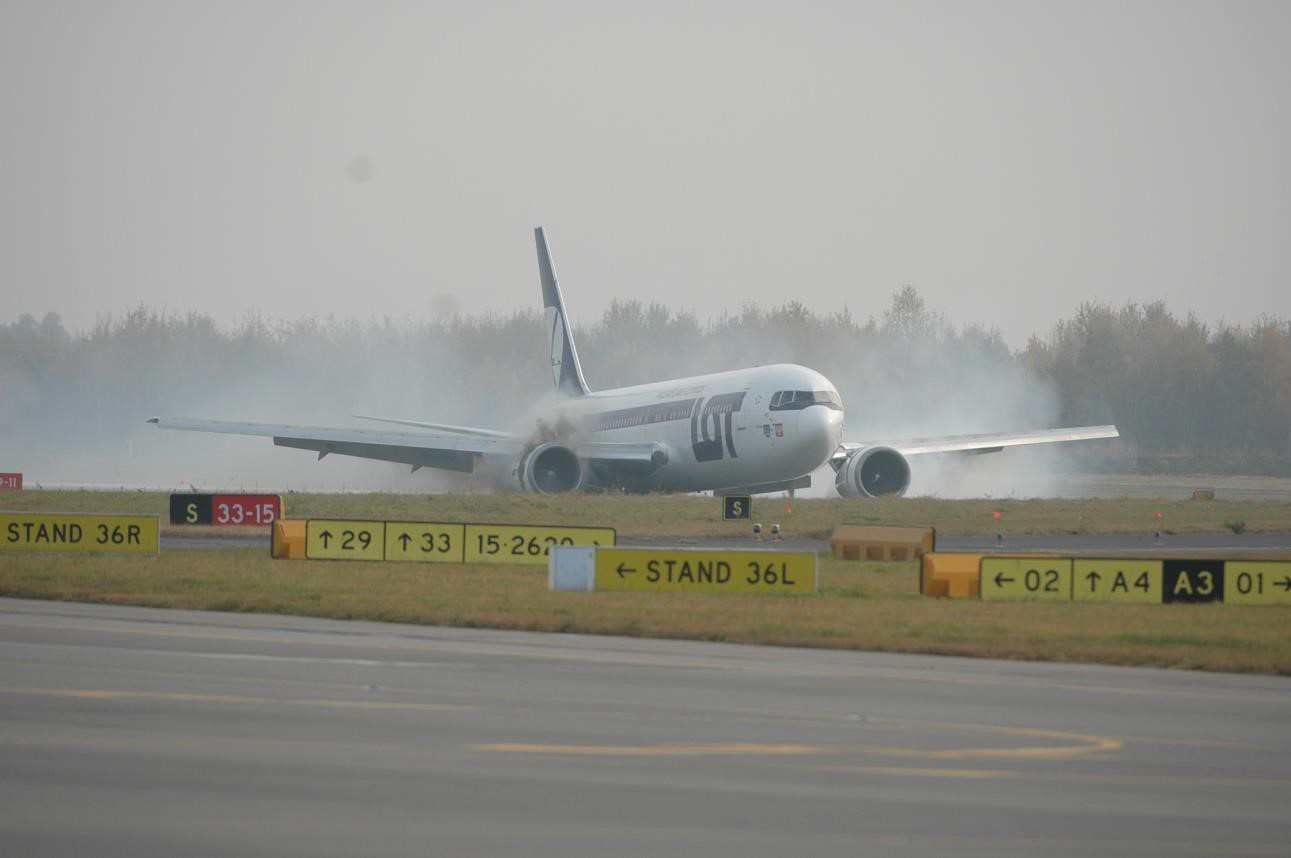
After stopping on the runway

=== Preparation for landing ===
The airport was evacuated for the arrival of the aircraft, and roads around the airport were closed to accommodate emergency services. Other flights which were due into Warsaw were diverted or returned to their point of departure.

At 14:40 CET the crew made a successful gear-up landing on Runway 33, with no injuries to anyone. The aircraft however, sustained substantial damage, resulting in a hull loss. All of those on board were evacuated within 90 seconds.

The airport runways remained closed to traffic until 16:00 CET, 3 November 2011, to enable removal of crash debris and then a final inspection of runways and aprons.

Shortly after the evacuation, a team from the Polish State Commission on Aircraft Accidents Investigation (SCAAI) discovered that the C829 circuit breaker, which protects a number of systems including the alternate landing gear extension system, was "popped", or opened, interrupting the circuit. The C4248 breaker for the alternate landing gear system remained closed.

After the plane was lifted off the runway, the C829 circuit breaker was closed, and the landing gear was extended using the alternate system. The plane was then towed to the LOT maintenance hangar for further investigation.

== Flight crew ==
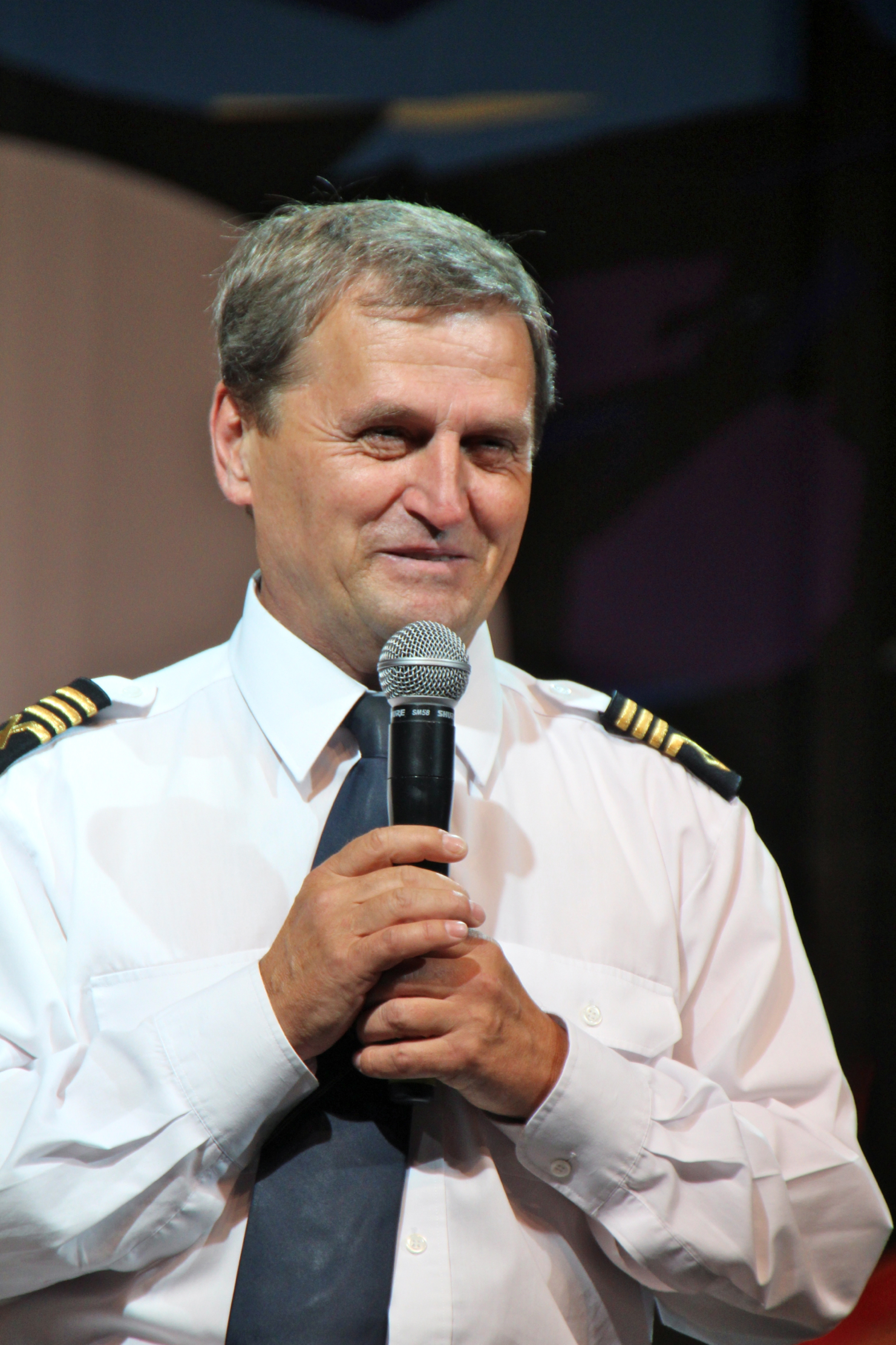
Captain Tadeusz Wrona in 2012

Flight 16 was captained by Tadeusz Wrona, a 57-year-old veteran pilot with twenty years of Boeing 767 experience. Both the captain and the 51-year-old first officer, Jerzy Szwarc, held Airline Transport Pilot Licenses with a combined total of over 25,000 flying hours, including 15,000 hours on the Boeing 767. This accident gave rise to a new saying (Wrona in Polish means crow): "Leć jak Orzeł, ląduj jak Wrona" (Fly like an eagle, land like a crow).

== Investigation ==
The preliminary report by the SCAAI found that a hydraulic leak occurred shortly after takeoff, after the landing gear and flaps were retracted. The leak was caused by excessive bending of a flexible hose in the center hydraulic system, resulting in the loss of all fluid in that system. The drop in pressure was indicated by the EICAS and recorded by the flight data recorder. Later investigation indicated a popped circuit breaker just to the right of the F/O at floor level would have enabled the electric motor for releasing the undercarriage. The breaker was reset after landing and the undercarriage extended normally.

The final report of the accident was released in 2017. The causes of the accident were the center hydraulic hose leak, the C829 circuit breaker popping, and the flight crew's failure to detect the C829 breaker during the approach, which could have allowed them to lower the landing gear. Contributing factors were the lack of safeguards to prevent accidental opening of circuit breakers, the C829 circuit breaker being in a low position where the flight crew would have difficulty noticing its condition, LOT's operations center inadequate procedures, and LOT's failure to incorporate a Boeing service bulletin on the prevention of excessive bending in the hydraulic system hose.

== Aftermath ==
Polish President Bronisław Komorowski praised and thanked the crew for the successful landing. The Boeing 767, registration SP-LPC, was extensively damaged and LOT deemed the aircraft a hull loss. The accident represents the 14th hull loss of a Boeing 767. In November 2013, two years after the incident, the aircraft was scrapped.
