= Firefighting foam =

Foam used for fire suppression

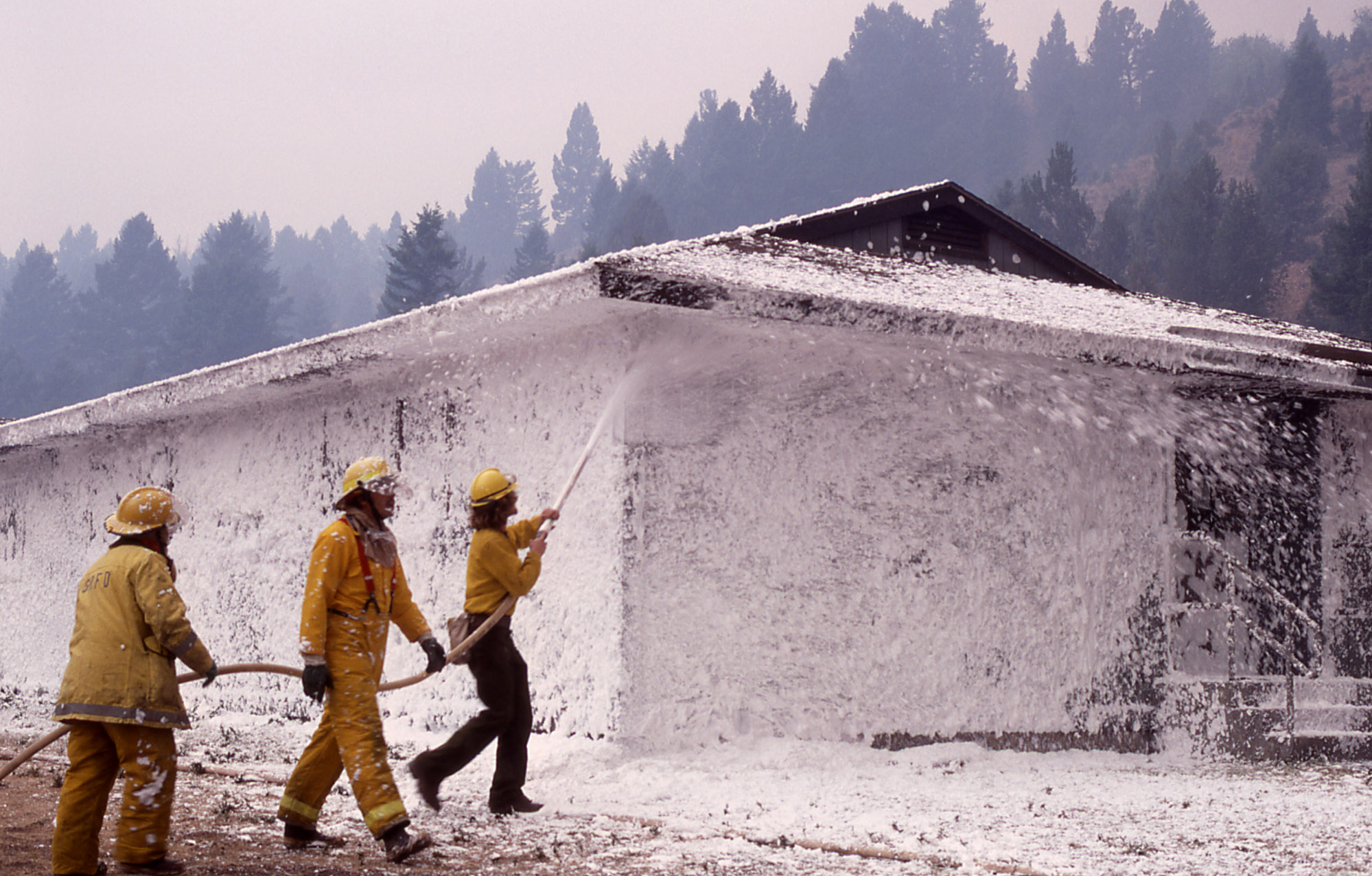
Firefighters spraying foam on structures in the Mammoth Hot Springs complex on 10 September 1988 during the Yellowstone Fires

Firefighting foam is a foam used for fire suppression. Its role is to cool the fire and to coat the fuel, preventing its contact with oxygen, thus achieving suppression of the combustion. Firefighting foam was invented by the Moldovan engineer and chemist Aleksandr Loran in 1902.

The surfactants used must produce foam in concentrations of less than 1%. Other components of fire-retardant foams are organic solvents (e.g., trimethyl-trimethylene glycol and hexylene glycol), foam stabilizers (e.g., lauryl alcohol), and corrosion inhibitors.

== Overview ==
- Low-expansion foams, such as aqueous film forming foams (AFFFs), have an expansion ratio of less than 20, are low-viscosity, mobile, and can quickly cover large areas.
- Medium-expansion foams have an expansion ratio of 20–200.
- High-expansion foams have an expansion ratio over 200–1000 and are suitable for enclosed spaces such as hangars, where quick filling is needed.
- Alcohol-resistant foams contain a polymer that forms a protective layer between the burning surface and the foam, preventing foam breakdown by alcohols in the burning fuel. Alcohol-resistant foams are used in fighting fires of fuels containing oxygenates, e.g. methyl tert-butyl ether (MTBE), or fires of liquids based on or containing polar solvents.

== Class A foams ==
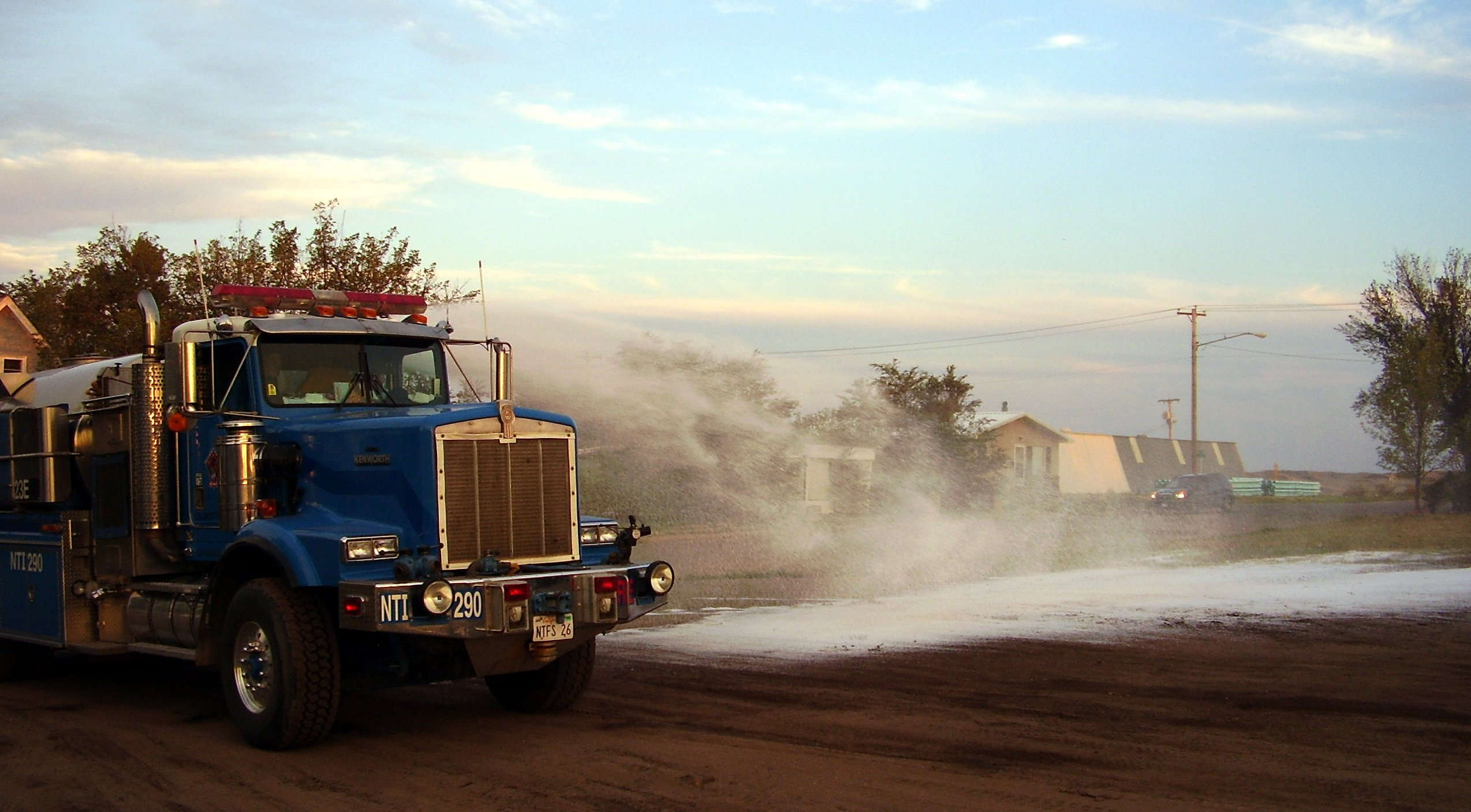
A fire demonstrating Class A foam in a CAFS system

Class A foams were developed in the mid-1980s for fighting wildfires. Class A foams lower the surface tension of the water, which assists in the wetting and saturation of Class A foams with water. It penetrates and extinguishes embers at depth. This aids fire suppression and can prevent re-ignition. Favourable experiences led to its acceptance for fighting other types of class A fires, including structure fires.

== Class B foams ==
Class B foams are designed for flammable liquid fire classes. The use of class A foam on a class B fire may yield unexpected results, as class A foams are not designed to contain the explosive vapours produced by flammable liquids. Class B foams have two major subtypes.

=== Synthetic foams ===
Synthetic foams are based on synthetic surfactants. They provide better flow and spreading over the surface of hydrocarbon-based liquids, for faster knockdown of flames. They have limited post-fire security and are toxic groundwater contaminants.

- Aqueous film forming foams (AFFF) are water-based and frequently contain hydrocarbon-based surfactants such as sodium alkyl sulfate, and fluorosurfactants, such as fluorotelomers, perfluorooctanoic acid (PFOA), or perfluorooctanesulfonic acid (PFOS).
- Alcohol-resistant aqueous film-forming foams (AR-AFFF) are foams resistant to the action of alcohols and can form a protective film.
- Fluorine-free foams (FFF, also called F3) are mostly based on hydrocarbon surfactants and are free of any fluorosurfactant.

=== Protein foams ===
Protein foams contain natural proteins as the foaming agents. Unlike synthetic foams, protein foams are bio-degradable. They flow and spread slower, but provide a foam blanket that is more heat-resistant and more durable.

Protein foams include regular protein foam (P), fluoroprotein foam (FP) (a mixture of protein foam and fluorinated surfactants), film-forming fluoroprotein (FFFP), alcohol-resistant fluoroprotein foam (AR-FP), and alcohol-resistant film-forming fluoroprotein (AR-FFFP).

=== Composite foams ===
Composite foams or "dry foams" take a very different approach to suppressing vapors. Where in lieu of adding exotic chemicals to increase the durability of fragile water bubble, they begin with a styrene or similar core and add thin engineered coatings. The principle is the same in that they occupy the surface area of liquid fuels, denying the ability to develop a vapor layer above. This approach requires no water or PFOS chemicals. They are often buoyant, do not break down even in the presence of polar solvents and do not mix with fuels. In certain geographies like the arctic where water is impractical to store and deploy, it is the only viable option for full surface fire suppression. These are not biodegradable, but they are landfill acceptable if cleaned of hydrocarbons, and in some cases can be reused.

== Applications ==
Every type of foam has its application. High-expansion foams are used when an enclosed space, such as a basement or hangar, must be quickly filled. Low-expansion foams are used on burning spills. AFFF is the best for spills of jet fuels, FFFP is better for cases where the burning fuel can form deeper pools, and AR-AFFF is suitable for burning alcohols. High-performing FFF are viable alternatives to AFFF and AFFF-AR for various applications. The most flexibility is achieved by AR-AFFF or AR-FFFP. AR-AFFF must be used in areas where gasoline is blended with oxygenates, since the alcohols prevent the formation of the film between the FFFP foam and the gasoline, breaking down the foam, and rendering the FFFP foam virtually useless.

=== Application techniques ===
There are two main application techniques of applying foam onto a fire, recognized by the European (EN1568) and international (ISO7203) standards:

Sweep (roll-on) method - Use only on a pool of flammable product on open ground. Direct the foam stream onto the ground in front of the product involved. May need to move the hose line or use multiple lines to cover the material. If multiple lines are used, be aware of other firefighters in the area.

Bankshot (bankdown) method - Firefighter uses an object to deflect the foam stream so it flows down the burning surface. Application should be as gentle as possible. Direct the foam at a vertical object. Allow the foam to spread over the material and form a foam blanket.

Raindown method - Used when unable to employ the bankshot method or the roll-on method. Loft the foam stream into the air above the material and let it fall gently onto the surface. Effective as long as the foam stream completely covers the material. Might not be effective if wind conditions are unfavorable

== History ==
Water has long been a universal agent for suppressing fires, but is not best in all cases. For example, water is typically ineffective on oil fires, and can be dangerous. Fire-fighting foams were developed for extinguishing oil fires.

In 1902, a method of extinguishing flammable liquid fires by blanketing them with foam was introduced by Russian engineer and chemist Aleksandr Loran. Loran was a teacher in a school in Baku, the center of the Russian oil industry at that time. Impressed by large, difficult-to-extinguish oil fires that he had seen there, Loran tried to find a liquid substance that could deal effectively with them. He invented fire-fighting foam, which was successfully tested in experiments in 1902 and 1903. In 1904 Loran patented his invention, and developed the first foam extinguisher the same year.

The original foam was a mixture of two powders and water produced in a foam generator. It was called chemical foam because of the chemical action to create it. In general, the powders used were sodium bicarbonate and aluminium sulfate, with small amounts of saponin or liquorice added to stabilise the bubbles. Hand-held foam extinguishers used the same two chemicals in solution. To actuate the extinguisher, a seal was broken and the unit inverted, allowing the liquids to mix and react. Chemical foam is a stable solution of small bubbles containing carbon dioxide with lower density than oil or water, and exhibits persistence for covering flat surfaces. Because it is lighter than the burning liquid, it flows freely over the liquid surface and extinguishes the fire by a smothering (removal/prevention of oxygen) action. Chemical foam is considered obsolete today because of the many containers of powder required, even for small fires.

In the 1940s, Percy Lavon Julian developed an improved type of foam called Aerofoam. Using mechanical action, a liquid protein-based concentrate, made from soy protein, was mixed with water in either a proportioner or an aerating nozzle to form air bubbles with the free-flowing action. Its expansion ratio and ease of handling made it popular. Protein foam is easily contaminated by some flammable liquids, so care should be used so that the foam is applied only above the burning liquid. Protein foam has slow knockdown characteristics, but it is economical for post-fire security.

In the early 1950s, high-expansion foam was conceived by Herbert Eisner in England at the Safety in Mines Research Establishment (now the Health & Safety Laboratory) to fight coal mine fires. Will B. Jamison, a Pennsylvania Mining Engineer, read about the proposed foam in 1952, requested more information about the idea. He proceeded to work with the US Bureau of Mines on the idea, testing 400 formulas until a suitable compound was found. In 1964, Walter Kidde & Company (now Kidde) bought the patents for high-expansion foam.

In the 1960s, National Foam, Inc. developed fluoroprotein foam. Its active agent is a fluorinated surfactant that provides an oil-rejecting property to prevent contamination. In general, it is better than protein foam because its longer blanket life provides better safety when entry is required for rescue. Fluoroprotein foam has fast knockdown characteristics and it can also be used together with dry chemicals that destroy protein foam.

In the mid-1960s, the US Navy developed aqueous film-forming foam (AFFF). This synthetic foam has a low viscosity and spreads rapidly across the surface of most hydrocarbon fuels. A water film forms beneath the foam, which cools the liquid fuel, stopping the formation of flammable vapors. This provides dramatic fire knockdown, an important factor in crash rescue firefighting.

In the early 1970s, National Foam, Inc. invented alcohol-resistant AFFF technology. AR-AFFF is a synthetic foam developed for both hydrocarbon and polar-solvent materials. Polar solvents are combustible liquids that destroy conventional fire-fighting foam. These solvents extract the water contained in the foam, breaking down the foam blanket. Hence, these fuels require an alcohol- or polar-solvent-resistant foam. Alcohol-resistant foam must be bounced off of a surface and allowed to flow down and over the liquid to form its membrane, compared to standard AFFF that can be sprayed directly onto the fire.

In 1993, Pyrocool Technologies Inc. acquired the patent rights to a wetting agent with superior cooling properties that is effective on Class A, Class B, Class D as well as pressurized and 3-dimensional fires involving both hydro carbon based fuels and polar solvents such as alcohol and ethanol. The wetting agent is marketed under the name of Pyrocool. Pyrocool Technologies Inc. was awarded the 1998 Presidential Green Chemistry Award by the USEPA. Carol Browner, the USEPA Administrator in 1998, described Pyrocool as the "Technology for the Third Millennium: The Development and Commercial Introduction of an Environmentally Responsible Fire Extinguishment and Cooling Agent". A dispute with the manufacturer, Baum's Castorine, resulted in Baum's rebranding this formula under the name Novacool UEF and has been selling this product under that name since 2008.

In 2002, BIOEX a French manufacturer of firefighting foam, pioneer in environmentally friendly foams, launched the first fluorine-free foam (ECOPOL) into the market. The foam concentrate is highly efficient on class B hydrocarbon and polar solvent fires, as well as on class A fires. Their environmental challenge has been to convince their customers to choose their new generation of green products, which are 100% fluorine free, and have proven to be effective.

In 2010, Orchidee International of France developed the first FFHPF, the highest performing fluorine-free foam. The foam has achieved a 97% degradability rating and is currently marketed by Orchidee International under the brand name "BluFoam". The foam is used at 3% both on hydrocarbon and polar solvent fires.

== Environmental and health concerns ==
Studies have shown that PFOS is a persistent, bioaccumulative, and toxic pollutant. It was added to Annex B of the Stockholm Convention on Persistent Organic Pollutants in May 2009. Regulations in the United States, Canada, European Union, Australia, and Japan have banned the new production of PFOS-based products, including firefighting foams. 3M phased out production of PFOS in 2002 due to toxicity concerns.

One study, published in 2015, found that firefighters were more likely to have fluorinated surfactants in their bloodstream. In 2016, the United States Air Force paid $4.3 million for a water treatment system for residents downstream of Peterson Air Force Base in Colorado.

Aqueous Film Forming Foam (AFFF) contains ethanol, 2-(2-butoxyethoxy) which is a glycol ether. Glycol ethers are a hazardous substance according to the Comprehensive Environmental Response, Compensation, and Liability Act, or CERCLA. The Clean Air Act categorizes glycol ethers as hazardous air pollutants. The main organic chemical component of the AFFF does not degrade. Instead, it remains present in the ecological system as well as the human body. Due to the environmental and public health impact of AFFFs, legislation has been put in place to phase out the use of AFFFs.

In the United States, discharges of AFFF by vessels to surface waters are regulated by the United States Environmental Protection Agency (EPA) and Department of Defense, pursuant to the Clean Water Act.

In Australia, in 2015 a public safety announcement was issued by the New South Wales Environment Protection Authority following a water source contamination near RAAF Base Williamtown. Surface water, groundwater, and fish were reported to contain chemicals from firefighting foams that had been released by the local Royal Australian Air Force base prior to training protocol changes in 2008. The residents of the area were advised to not consume any bore water, in addition to eggs and seafood from fauna exposed to the contaminated water. The discovery led to the banning of all forms of fishing in the waters of Fullerton Cove until the beginning of October 2016.

As of 2017, the Australian Department of Defence was dealing with two class-action suits brought by those affected by contamination at Williamtown and at Army Aviation Centre Oakey. Along with many airports and fire services, the Department of Defence is investigating possible contamination at 18 military sites across Australia. At Williamtown, it is also conducting studies on the uptake and residual contamination in plants, chickens, and eggs.

In December 2017, New Zealand's Minister for the Environment announced that higher than acceptable levels of PFOS and PFOA were found in groundwater at two Royal New Zealand Air Force bases, thought to be from historic use of firefighting foam containing the substances. Residents residing near the airbases were told to drink bottled water until more extensive testing could be carried out.

In 2020, state government agencies in the US are planning to dispose of firefighting foam, either by incineration or landfilling. Nearly 1 million US gal (3,800 kl) of foam will be disposed by the US. The potential health risks of incinerating AFFF are still being investigated by EPA and state agencies.

In 2020, Congress gave the U.S. Department of Defense until October 2024 to phase out and stop the use of AFFF. This was under the National Defense Authorization Act (NDAA) for Fiscal Year 2020. This act allowed the U.S. Department of Defense to use two one-year extension waivers which the Department of Defense (DoD) has since utilized. As of August 11, 2026, the U.S. Department of Defense notified Congress that it has extended its deadline to end its use of AFFF. The Department of Defense has struggled to comply with the AFFF ban and now can use only one more delay. The U.S. Department of Defense emphasized that it requires more time to transition to per-and polyfluoroalkyl substances (PFAs)-free foam. On July 31, 2026, the Department of Defense’s secretary for acquisition and sustainment, Michael Duffey, requested a one-year extension of the deadline for the department to comply with the PFAs ban related to AFFFs, extending the deadline for DOD’s compliance until October 1, 2027.

The DoD claims that it has made significant progress towards phasing out AFFF. Despite its progress, the DoD requested more time to transition to per- and polyfluoroalkyl substances (PFAS)-free alternative foams. One such fluorine-free foam is known as F3. There are new formations of firefighting foams that contain less PFAs compared to previous AFFF formulations. These new formulations are fluorine free foams (F3) and have less than 1 μg/liter PFAS according to the U.S. Environmental Protection Agency (EPA) Method 1633. Other alternatives to AFFF include high expansion foam, trench nozzles, water-only sprinklers, optical flame detection, water mist, and ignitable liquid drainage floor. An additional alternative is the C4-based eco-friendly AFFF, a fire extinguishing chemical developed in China.

== See also ==
- Compressed air foam system
- Foam depopulation – often done with firefighting foam
- Foam path
- Timeline of events related to per- and polyfluoroalkyl substances
- Wet water
