= Door breaching =

Methods used by military, police, firefighters to forcibly enter a structure

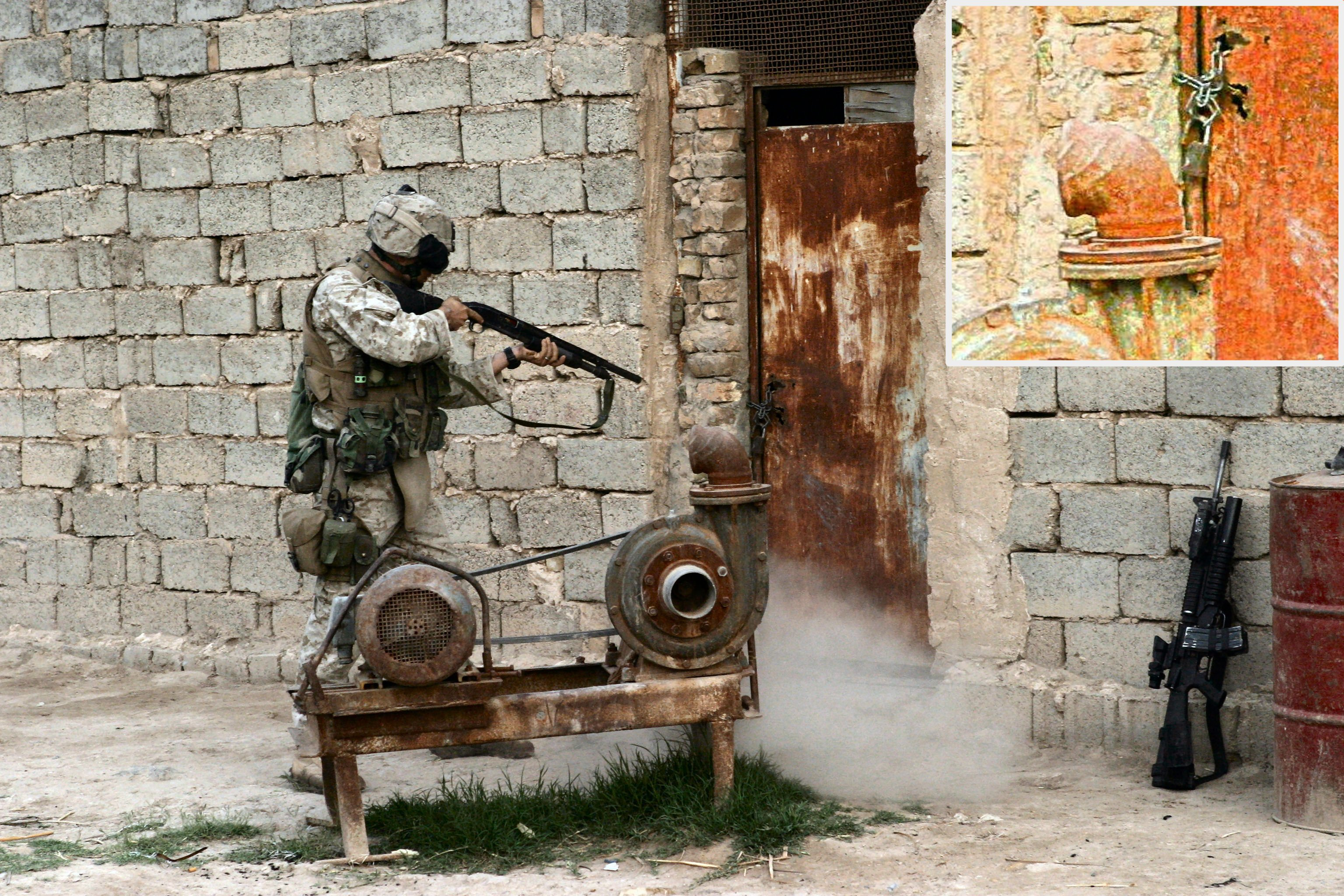
A U.S. Marine performs a ballistic breach of a padlocked door using a combat shotgun

Door breaching is a process used by military, police, or emergency services to force open closed or locked doors. A wide range of methods are available depending on the door's opening direction (inward or outward), construction materials, etc., and one or more of these methods may be used in any given situation. In the United States, residential doors typically open inward while commercial building doors usually open outward. Some breaching methods require specialized equipment and can be categorized as one of the following: mechanical breaching, ballistic breaching, hydraulic breaching, explosive breaching, or thermal breaching.

== Methods of entry ==
=== Manual methods ===
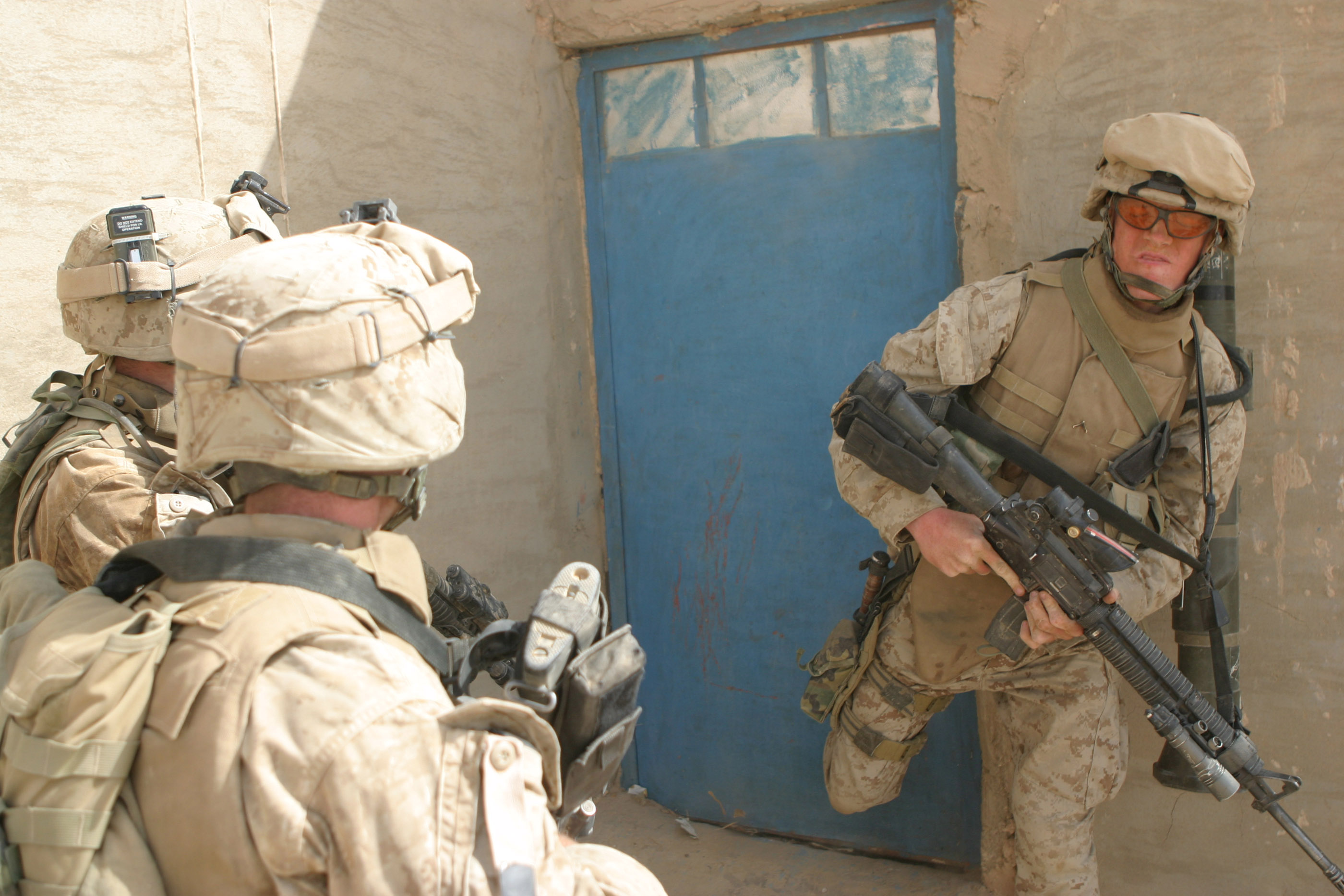
Back kicking a door

The simplest solution is to check the door knob first. Utilizing a breaching tool is unnecessary if the door is unlocked and easy to open. If the door is locked, breachers can attempt to force inward-opening doors with a strong kick. The breacher will aim to hit the door near the locking mechanism, but not kick the doorknob itself as one can easily twist an ankle doing so. Other methods, like ballistic breaching, can be supplemented afterward with a kick to force the door in.

=== Mechanical ===
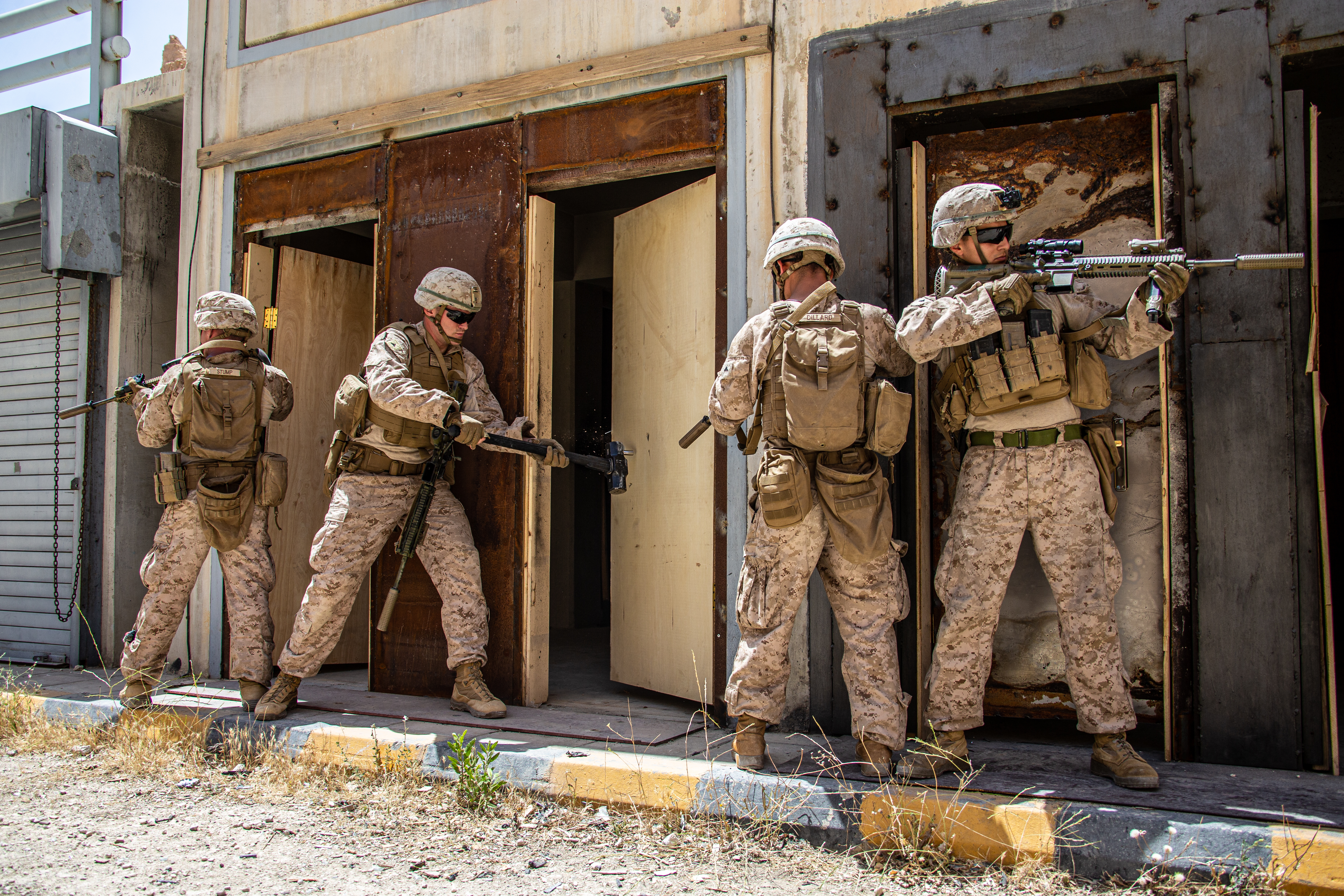
US Marines breach a door using a sledgehammer

Mechanical breaching can be used to defeat the latch, lock, hinges, or door itself and methods can vary from minimally destructive to very destructive. Lockpicking with traditional lock picks is a minimally destructive method but is relatively slow and requires a trained operator. Alternatively, a snap gun can be used to defeat the lock, which requires less skill and training. Tools can also be used to bypass the lock itself; for example, shims can be used to unlock padlocks by directly interacting with the bolts holding the padlock's shackle in place. For doors, a shove knife can be wedged into the door jamb and open the latch bolt without having to deal with the lock itself. Another option is to remove the cylinder lock from the door using instruments like an A-tool or K-tool; these methods also allow the door to be closed and re-locked afterward.

More dynamic methods use significantly more force to break the lock or door. Tools like the Halligan bar, pry bar, Denver tool, Kelly tool, claw tool, or "the pig", can be used to lever a door open. Other tools, like sledgehammers or battering rams (like the enforcer), concentrate a large amount of kinetic force on the door to defeat the locking mechanism. Padlocks and similar barriers can also be removed with bolt cutters. Doors can also be breached by cutting through the material of the door itself with a circular saw, though this is much slower. Although not strictly pertaining to door breaching, windows can also be breached to gain entry using a "break and rake" tool. This tool first "breaks" the window, then "rakes" aside pieces of broken glass as well as any window frame.

=== Hydraulic ===
Hydraulic breaching utilizes a hydraulic system to force the door open. These systems include hydraulic rescue tools (of the type used to extract people entrapped in vehicle wreckages) as well as specialized tools made specifically for door breaching. The hydraulic device may be powered manually, pneumatically, or electrically.

=== Ballistic ===
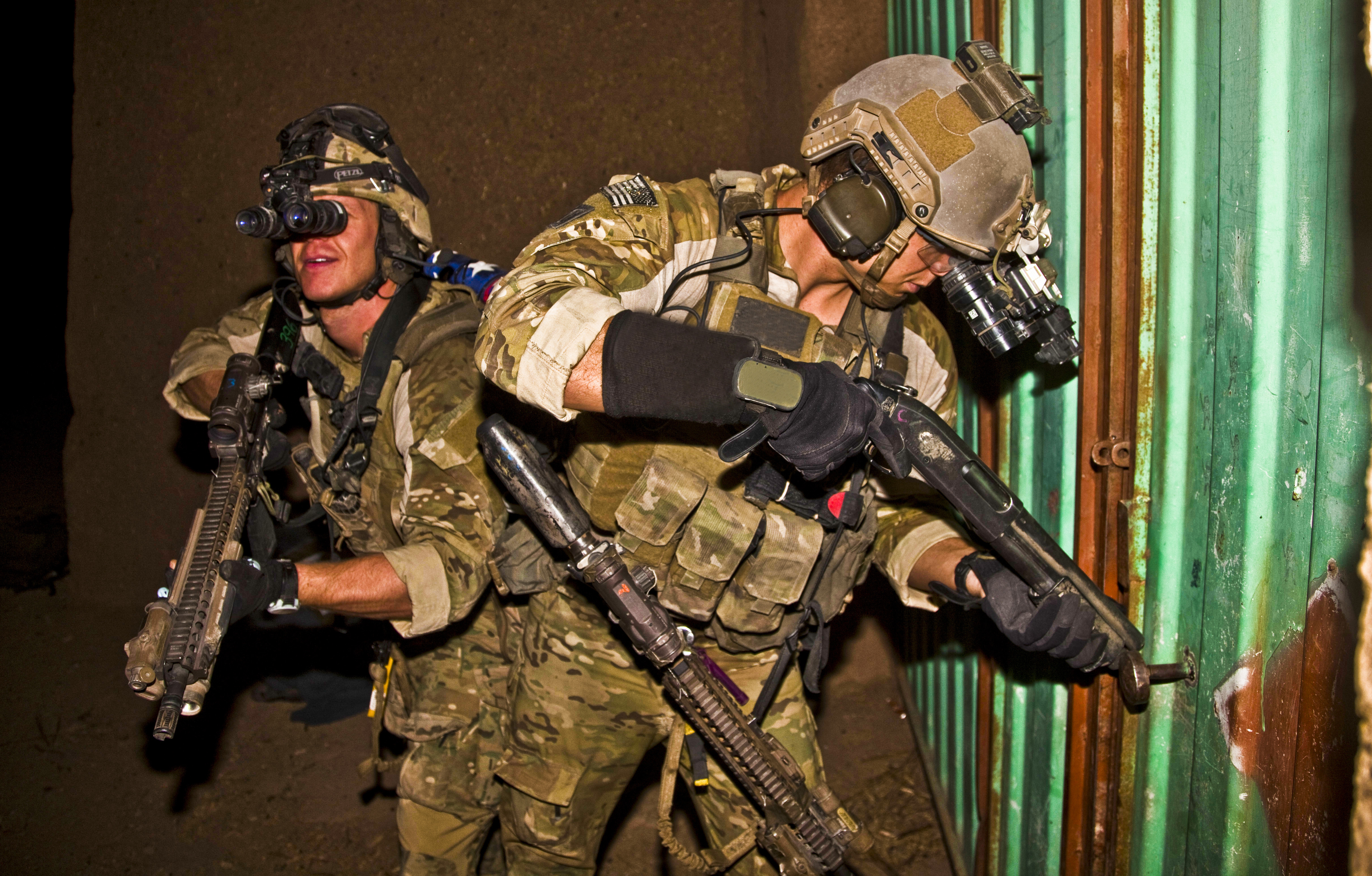
U.S. Army Rangers shotgun breach a door in Afghanistan

Ballistic breaching uses a projectile weapon to breach an opening. Weapons used can range from various small arms to a 120mm tank gun, which will easily breach most obstacles, though the force involved may violate the rules of engagement.

In practice, shotguns are usually used to destroy the latch and lock, or the hinges of the door. While in theory other firearms can be used, handguns are usually underpowered and rifles are less effective than the shotgun and pose a far higher risk of ricochet and collateral injury. Short pump-action shotguns are commonly used as they are less bulky and easier to maneuver. The shotgun can be used as a primary weapon by the breacher or be dedicated solely for breaching. If the latter, the shotgun can be holstered or slung in a harness when not in use. There are also breaching shotgun systems which can be mounted to a rifle to avoid the issue of managing two weapons. Examples include the KAC Masterkey, Ciener Ultimate Over/Under, M26 MASS, Metal Storm MAUL, and Crye Six12.

Most shotgun ammunition can be used for breaching, though the risk of injury varies with type. Of the available shotgun ammunition, shotgun slugs pose the highest risk, as they will retain significant energy to cause lethal wounds well after they have penetrated the door. Buckshot is far safer and birdshot even more so, as the multiple small projectiles disperse quickly after penetration, reducing the chances of causing a lethal wound (though more shots may be required if using birdshot). The safest option is a frangible round such as the TESAR or Hatton round, which turns to dust upon penetrating the door and disperses completely upon exit, though, these rounds are also more expensive.

Breaching a door with the fewest shots possible is faster and reduces the chance of collateral damage. Attacking the latch and lock is easiest, as it requires fewer shots and is easiest to target, whereas attacking the hinges requires more shots, and the hinges may not be visible from the outside. According to US urban warfare doctrine, the breaching operation is performed with the muzzle in contact with the door, or as close as possible, and angled downwards at a 45-degree angle. This process provides the best chance of hitting the desired point, while minimizing risk to occupants of the room being breached. Muzzle attachments are available on some specialized breaching shotguns to facilitate this operation, by holding the barrel securely in place while providing a slight standoff to allow powder gases to escape. For a breach on the latch side, US doctrine calls for two shots to be fired at a point halfway between the lock or handle and the door frame to hit the lock's bolt, and then an attempt made to open the door. If the door cannot be opened, the process would need to be quickly repeated. A hinge-side breach calls for a total of three shots per hinge followed by an attempt to open the door.

=== Explosive ===
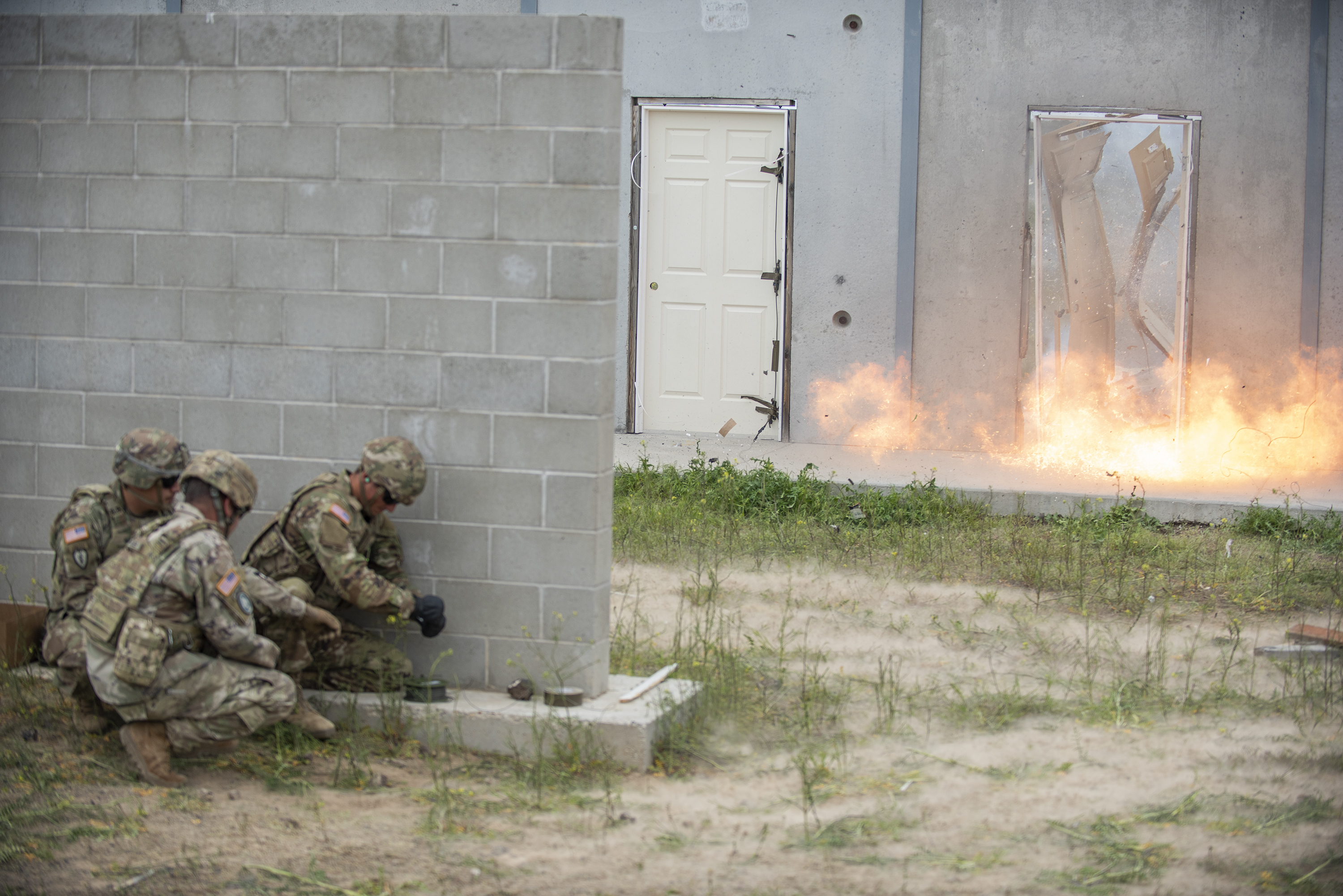
Idaho National Guard combat engineers practice explosive breaching. Explosive breach charges have been placed on the adjacent door's hinges.

Explosive breaching can be the fastest method, though it is also the most dangerous, to both the breachers and the room occupants. Depending on the situation, explosive breaching is potentially slower than a ballistic breach due to the large standoff required (if there is no cover available). Breaching can be performed with a specially formed breaching charge placed in contact with the door, or with various standoff breaching devices, such as specialized rifle grenades like the SIMON breach grenade.

Explosive breaching usually breaches doors via one of several mechanisms: pushing the door inward (e.g. water charge), cutting through the door's material (e.g. linear shaped charge), defeating the lock or hinge, or general blast effects (i.e. explosives in contact with door). The explosive breaching charges used can range from highly focused methods, such as detcord, plastic explosives, or strip shaped charges that explosively cut through doors or latches, to large satchel charges, containing 20 pounds (9.1 kg) of C-4, that can breach even reinforced concrete bunkers.

The explosive method of entry can be a safe and effective tool in the hands of qualified breachers. Whereas in the past, the rule of thumb was to use "P for plenty" if unsure whether adequate explosives were being applied, breachers today strive to use the least amount of explosive necessary to secure penetration into a target. Using the minimum amount of explosives necessary produces the least shockwave which reduces standoff distance for the team, potential injury to occupants, and damage to the general vicinity. This can be accomplished by calculating the net explosive weight (NEW) which is the equivalent weight of TNT that would be required to effect entry through various obstacles like reinforced concrete, plywood of various thicknesses, steel doors of various thicknesses, etc. The net explosive weights of commonly used explosives is recorded so breachers can refer to these values when calculating how much of a certain explosive would be needed to meet the necessary NEW.

The minimum standoff distance or minimum safe distance is the minimum distance from the explosive charge the breachers must be to avoid serious injury from overpressure. The minimum standoff distance is calculated based on the amount and type of explosive placed and is used to ensure that breachers do not experience greater than 4 psi (28 kPa) of overpressure. Hearing damage can occur at 3.4 psi (23 kPa) or greater, but this is negated by using hearing protection. Blast overpressure dissipates quickly in open air so it is ideal for creating standoff distance but it is not always available depending on tactical circumstances. Conversely, overpressure within structures is especially troublesome as sound reflects off walls and ceilings. Reduced minimum safe distance can be achieved by staying off axis from the explosive (including around a corner) or having a physical obstacle between the team and the explosive (like a wall or a blast blanket).

Minimum safe distance and effectiveness of explosives can be augmented by tamping. This entails laying materials over the explosive to help direct the blast toward the door or material that needs to be breached. Tamping can be done with sandbags, rubble, or even filled water containers. A water charge refers to an explosive breach charge that is tamped with water, typically consisting of two water bags and some detcord in the middle. Soldiers hit upon the idea to use saline-filled IV bags, which are commonly carried by medics, for such tamping and the practice spread to police organizations as well. While effective, these water charges are not without their downsides. Water is heavy and difficult to transport; it also makes the explosive charge heavier and more difficult to place. Special adhesives or a prop stick may be necessary to hold the charge in place. This adds complexity to the breach and the prop stick (if one is used) can become shrapnel. After detonation, the water will splash over the breach point and can present a slip hazard. Additionally, lower-than-freezing temperatures will render water unusable as a tamping agent. As a result, synthetic gel tamping agents have been developed as alternatives.

In addition to their tactical use, explosives have been used for search and rescue and other critical access situations.

=== Thermal ===
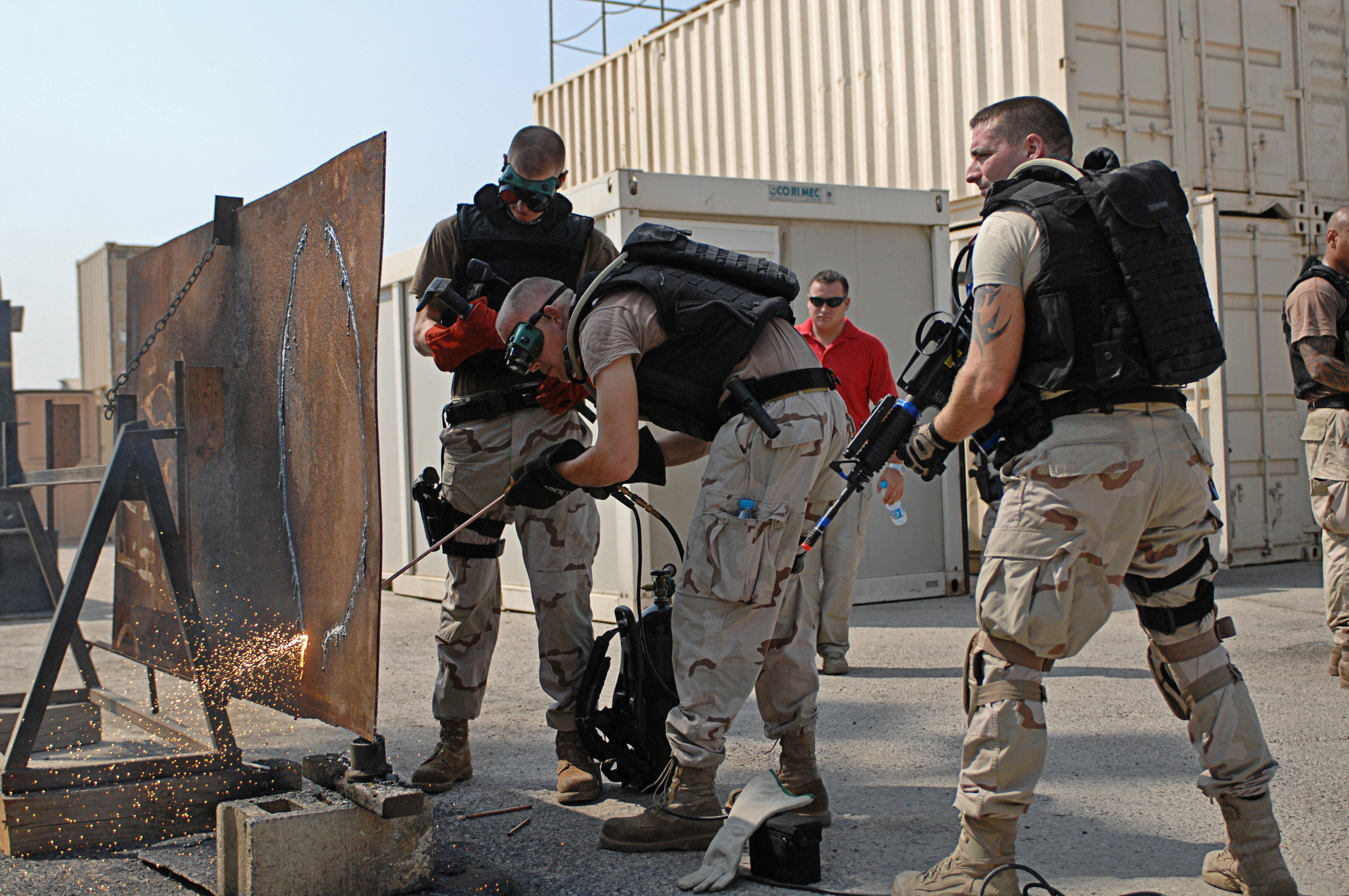
Crewmembers from a U.S. Coast Guard cutter practice exothermal breaching techniques

Thermal breaching is one of the least common techniques and also one of the slowest. It involves the use of a cutting torch to cut through metal doors. While man-portable cutting torch systems exist, they still weigh a significant amount. A lightweight single-use cutting torch has been developed which does not require the bulky, heavy oxygen cylinders typically employed by such systems, though, the torch has a limited use time and multiple torches may be required to complete a cut.

== Examples of entry tools and operations ==
Mechanical breaching

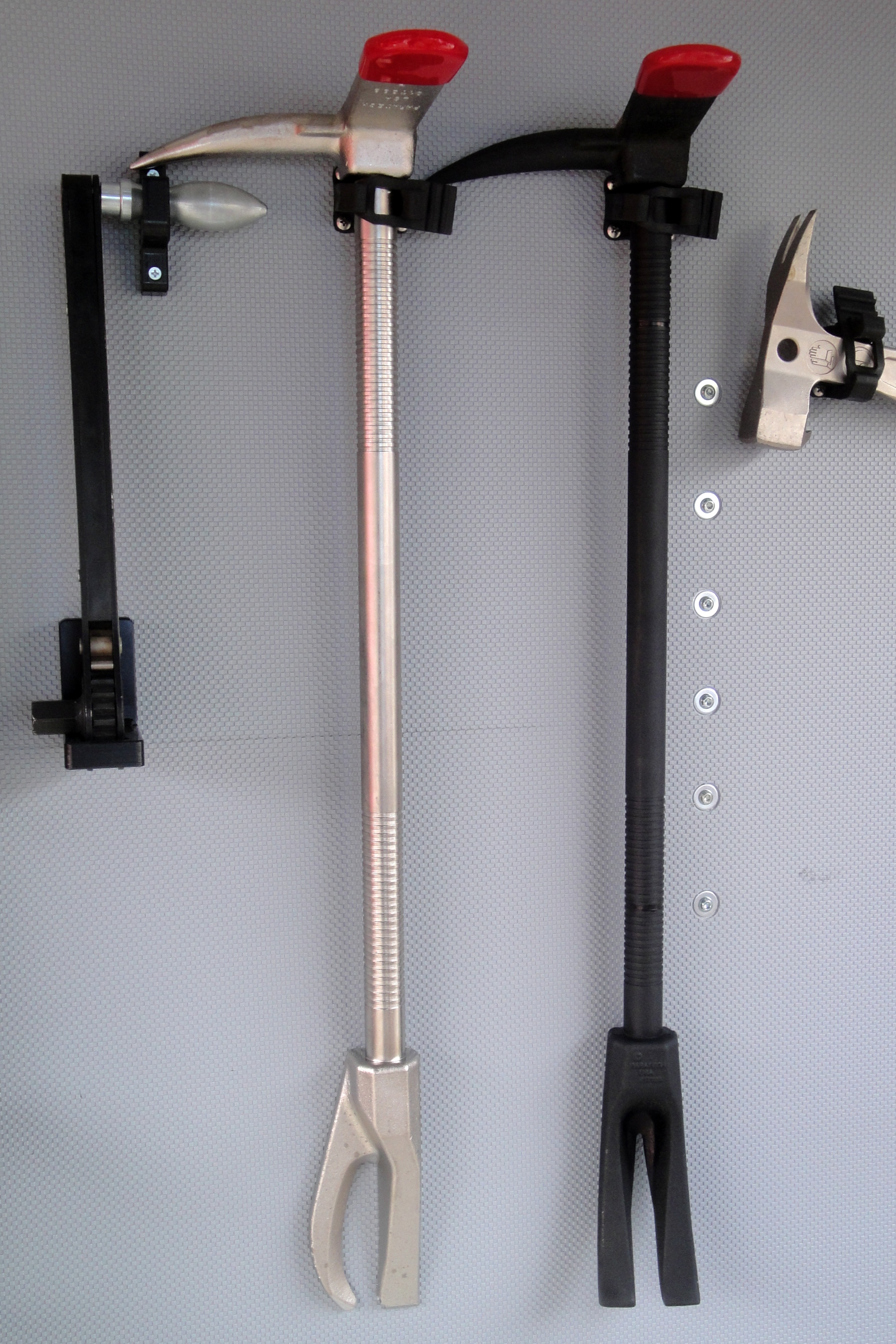
Halligan bars, commonly used by firefighters for gaining entry. When paired with an axe, they are referred to as "the irons"

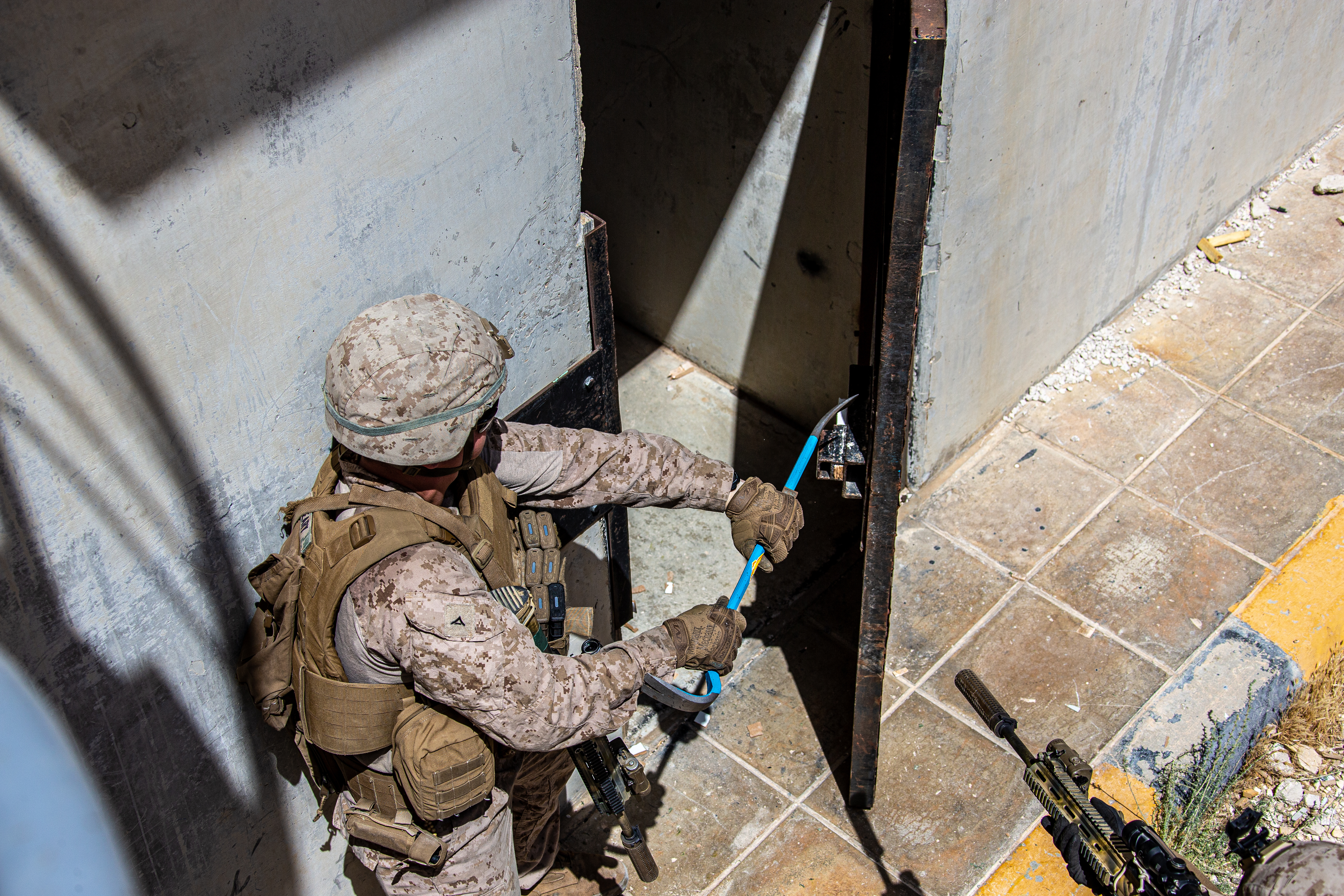
A pry bar being used to breach a door

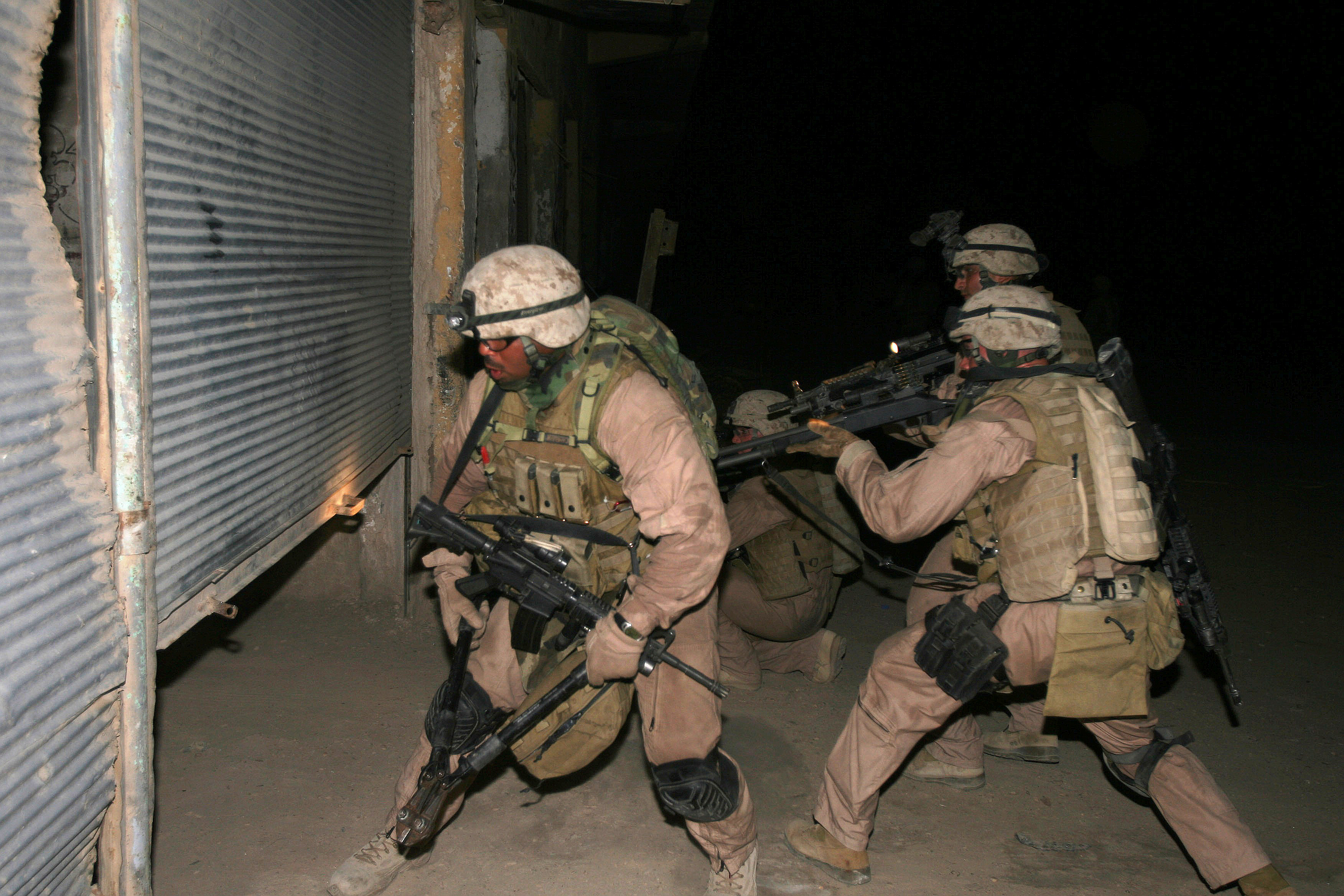
Bolt cutters being used to cut the padlock on a door

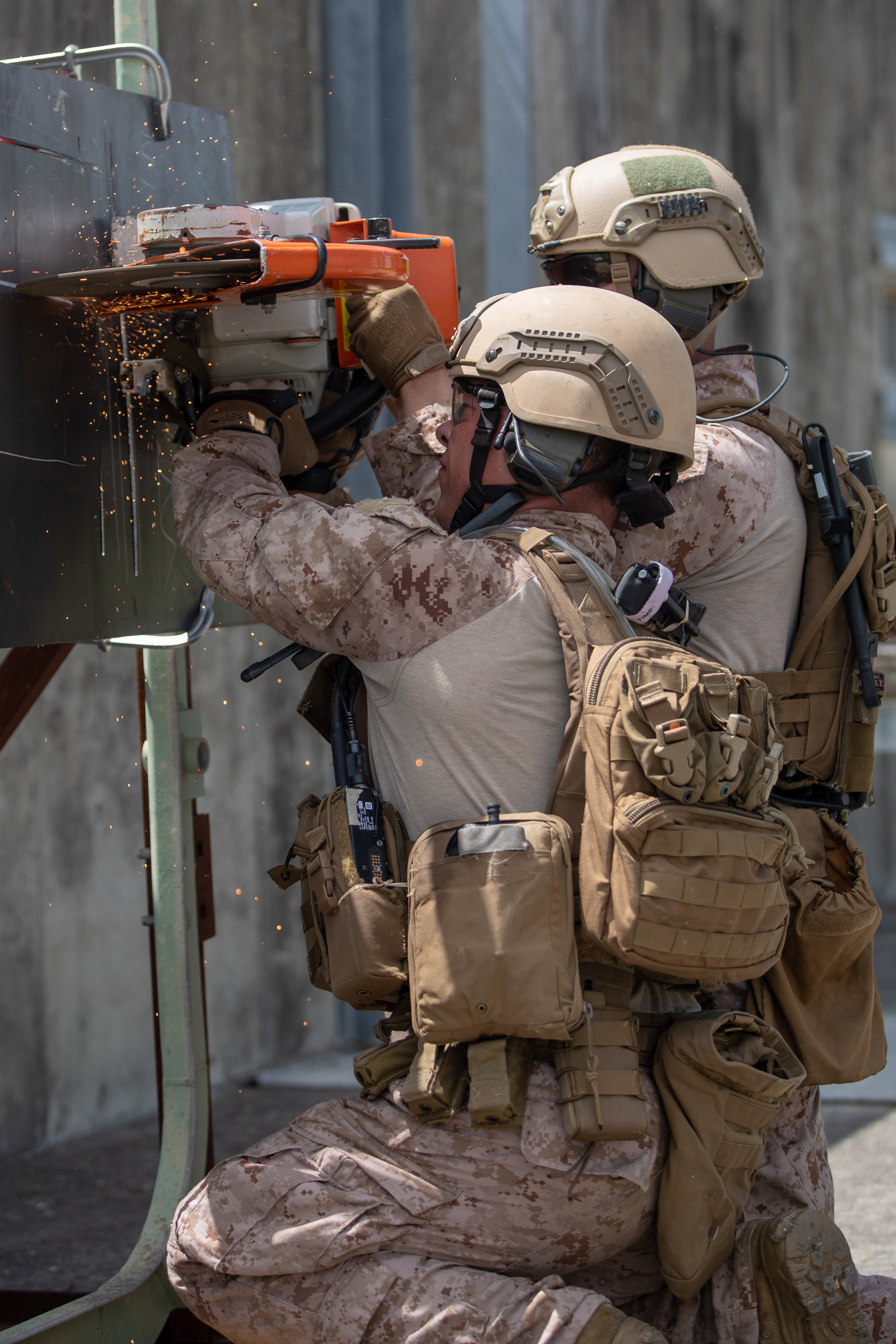
A circular saw being used to cut through a metal door

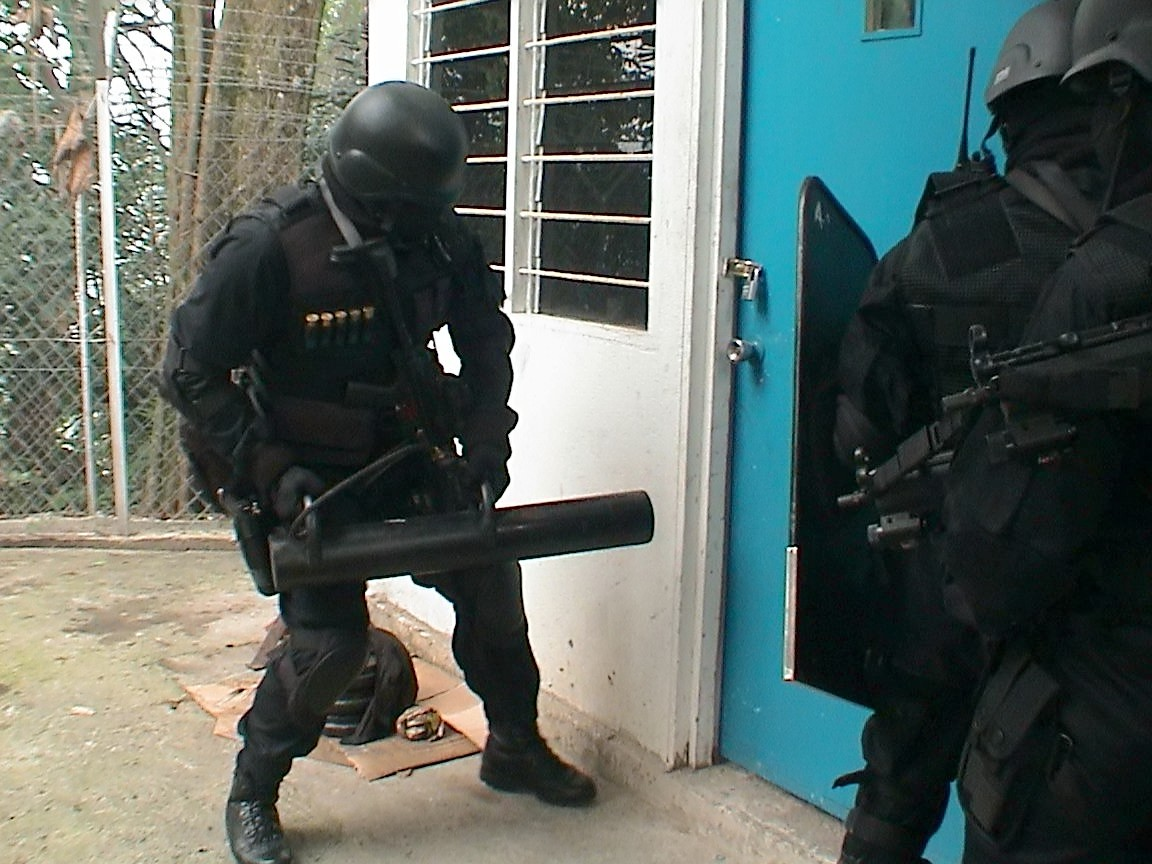
An enforcer used to ram doors
Hydraulic breaching

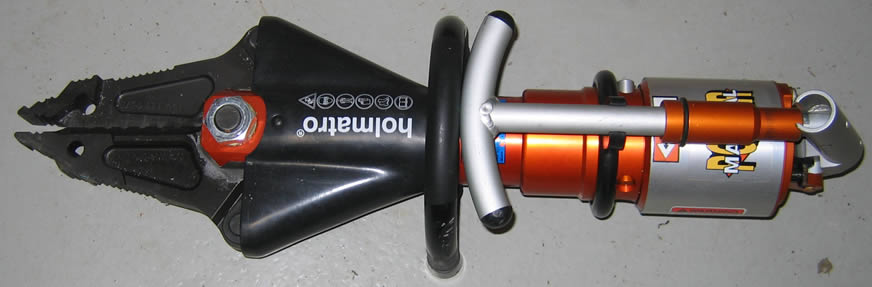
A manually operated hydraulic spreader-cutter of a type used by rescue workers to force open doors

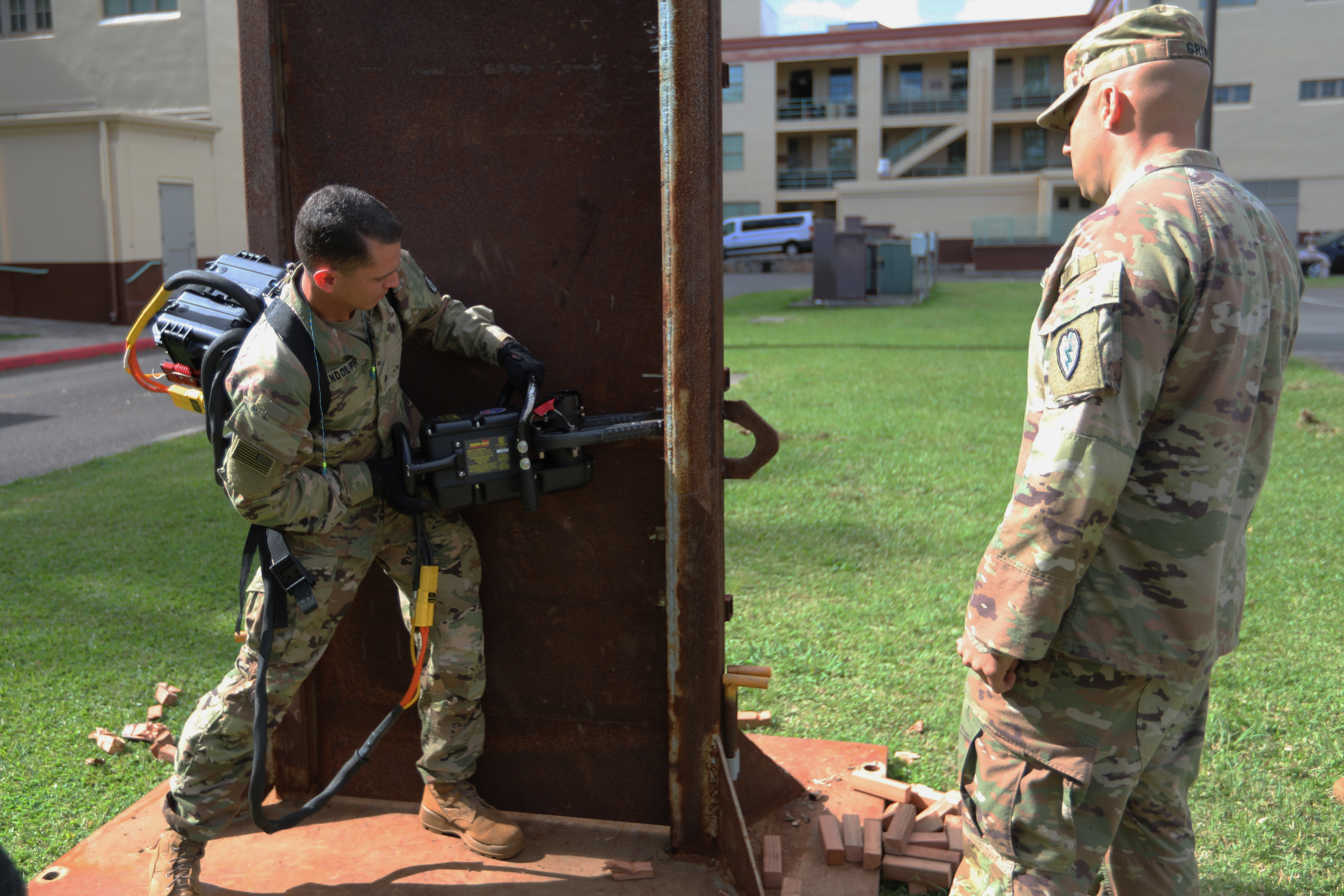
Externally powered hydraulic spreader being used on a door

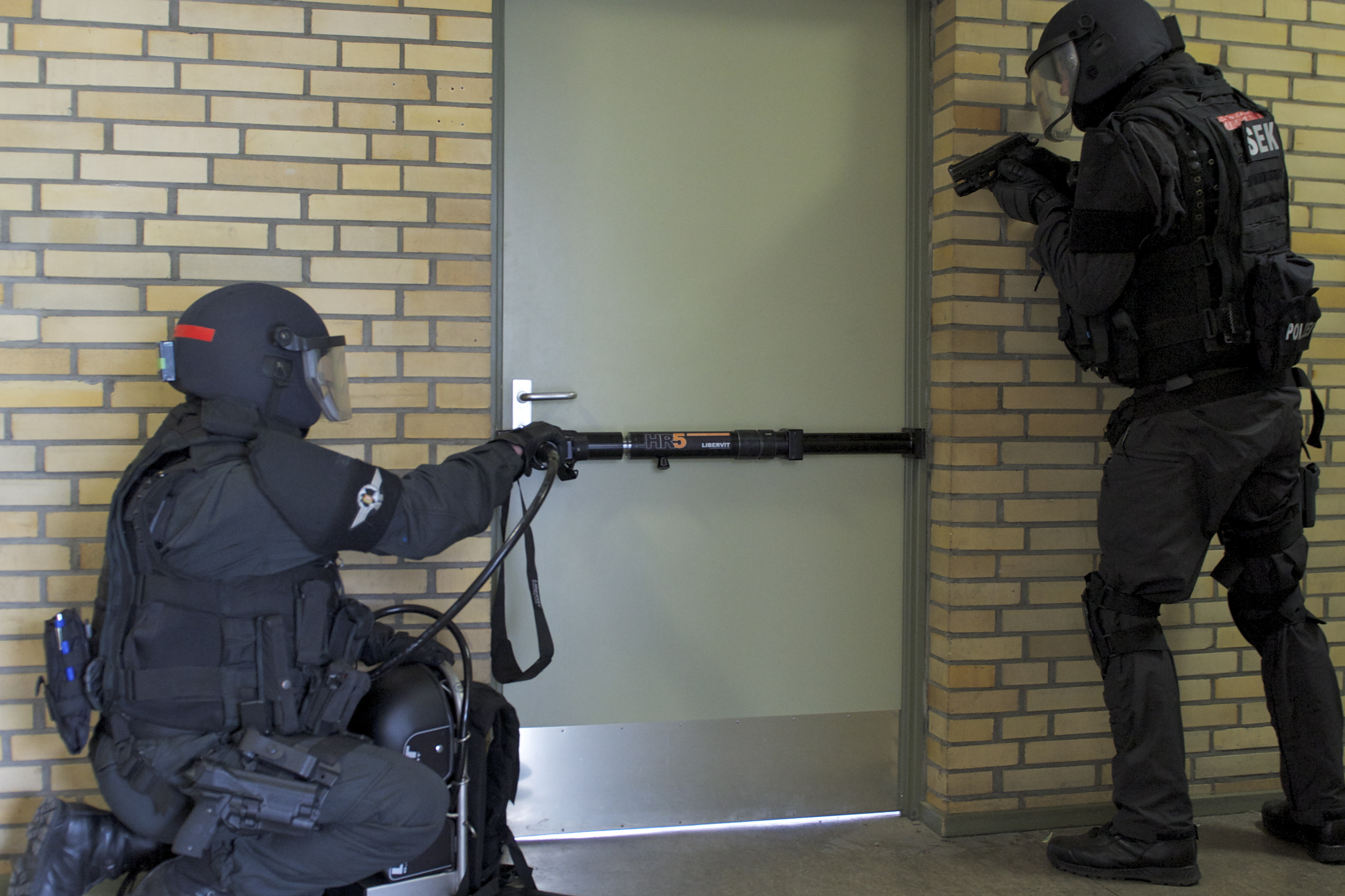
Hydraulic door opener
Ballistic breaching

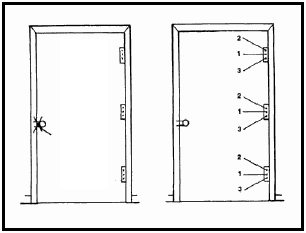
Suggested target locations for breaching a door at the latch (left) or the hinges (right)

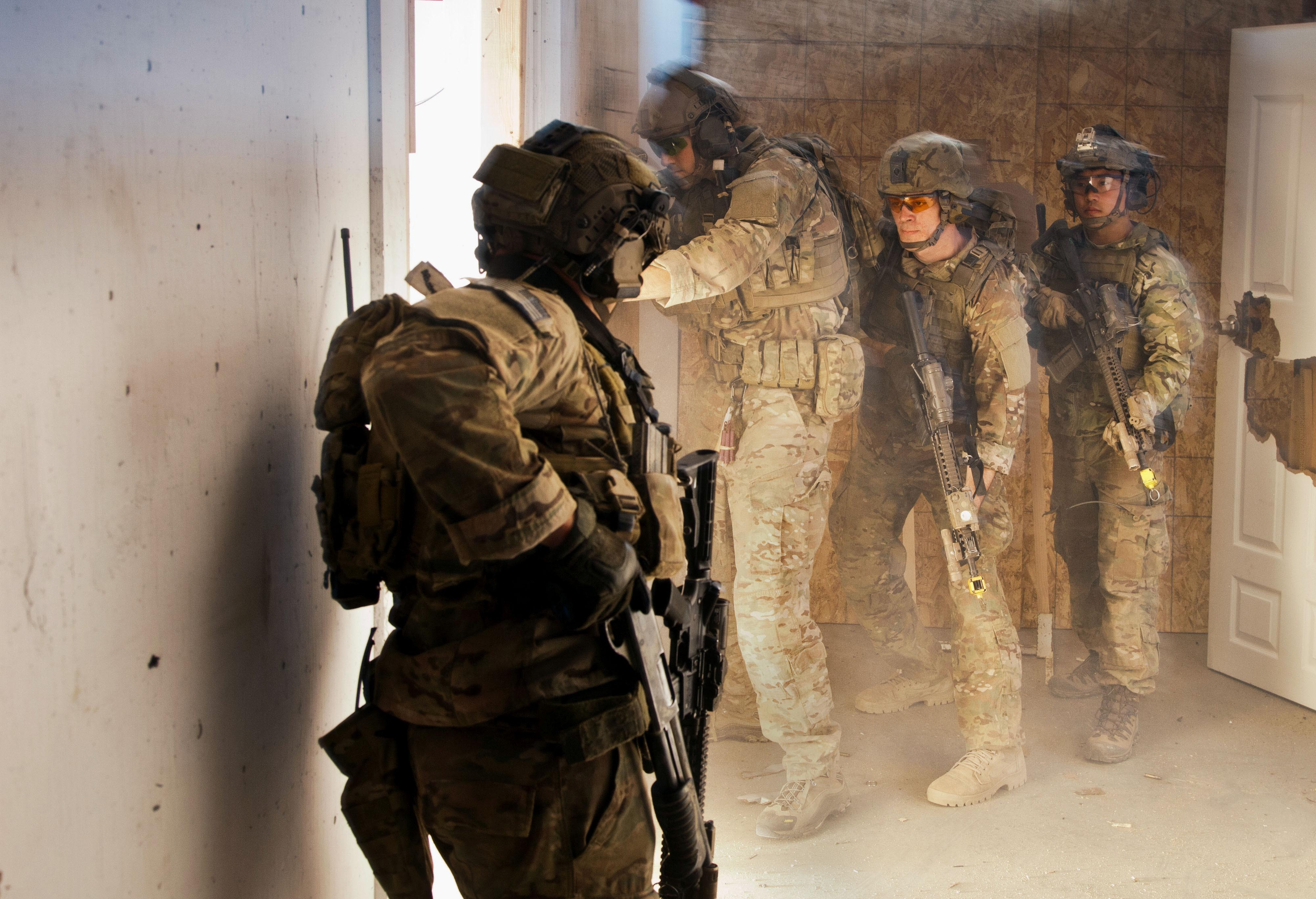
Short-barreled breaching shotgun without a stock being holstered in a harness under the operator's strong side

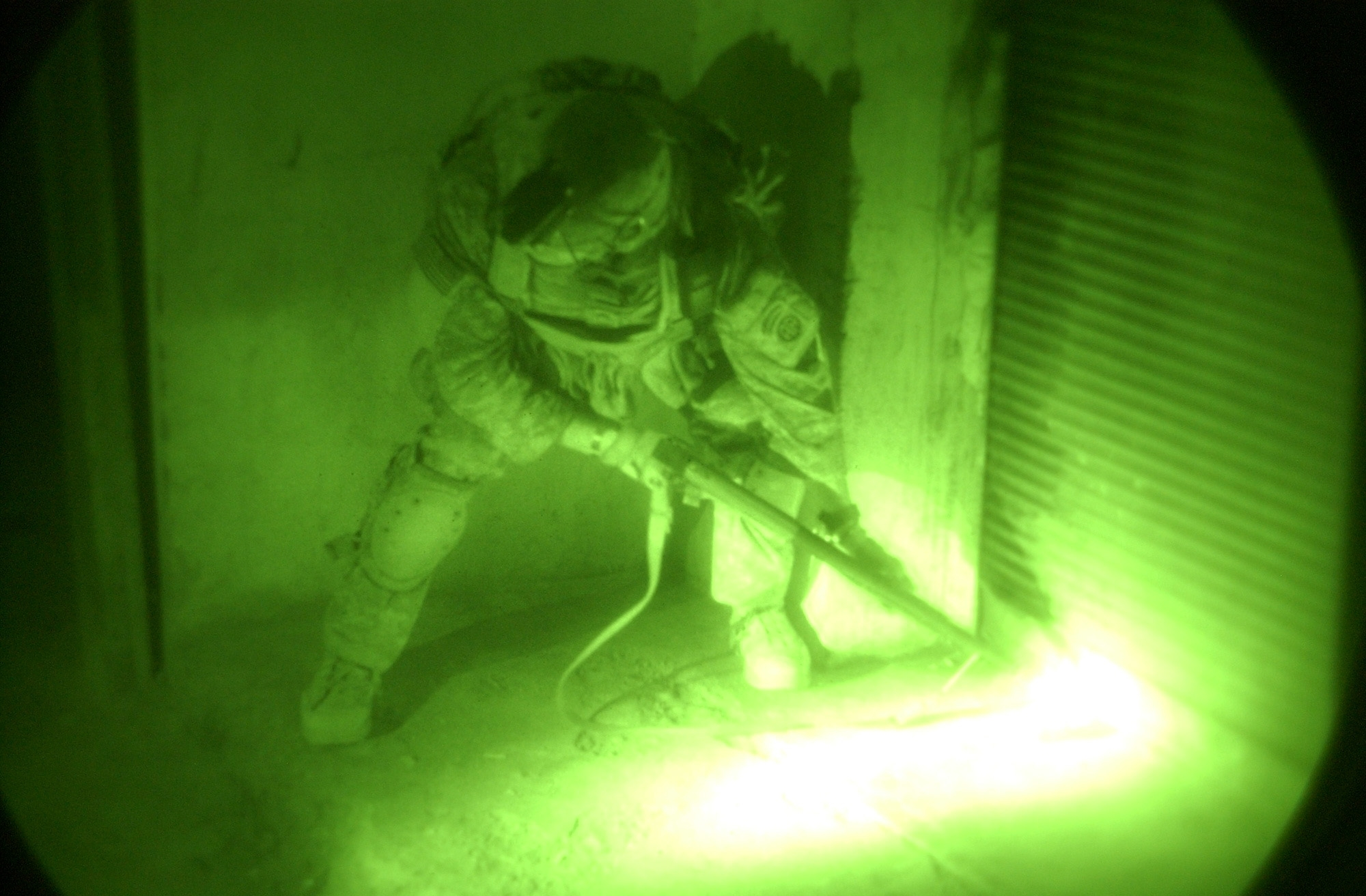
A ballistic breach at night of a padlocked door

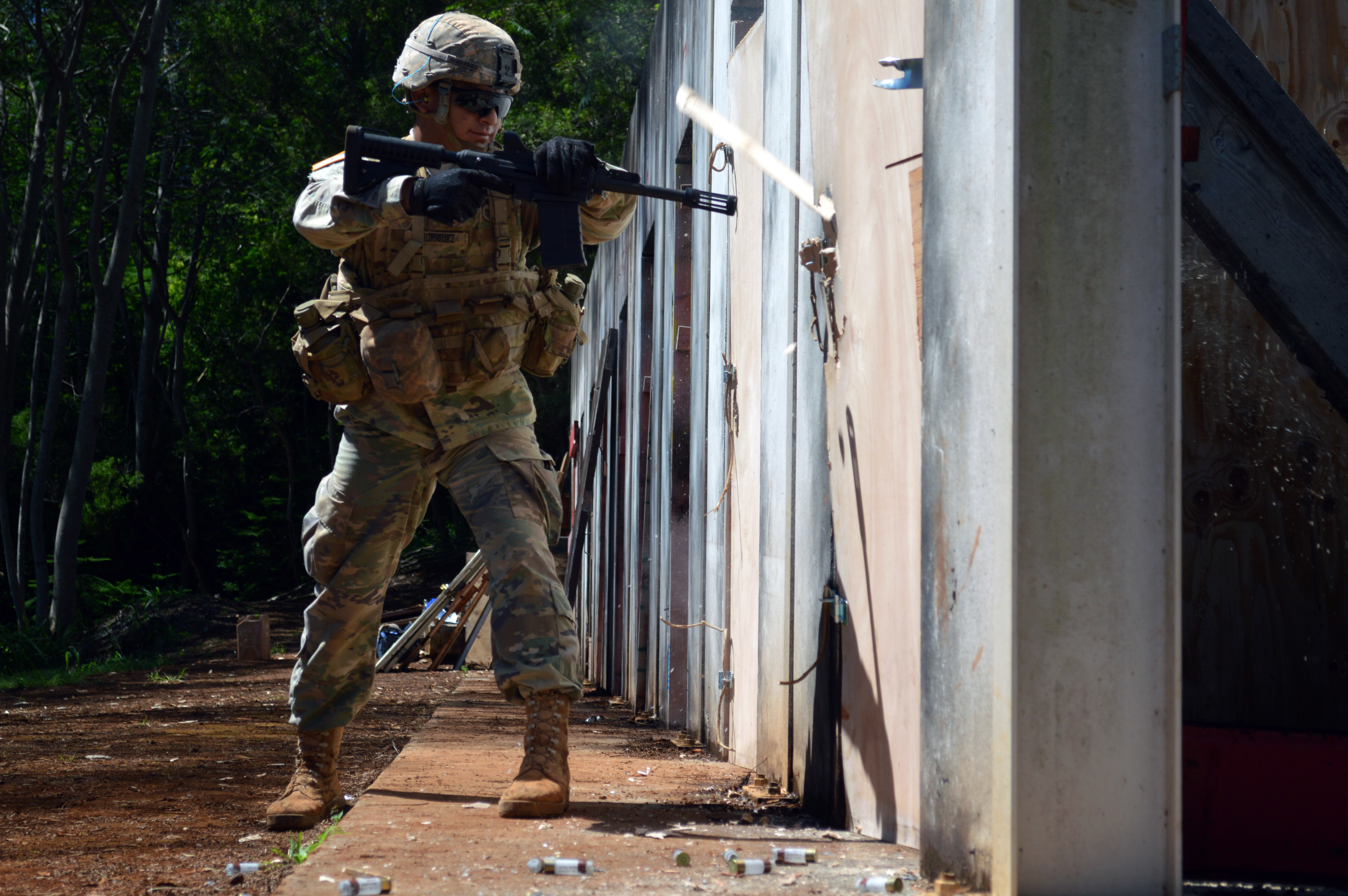
Using an M26 MASS to breach a door

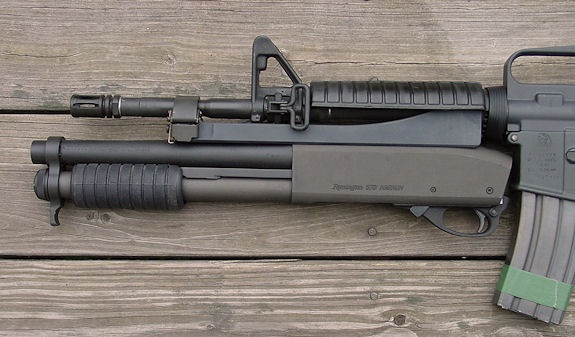
KAC Masterkey system
Explosive breaching

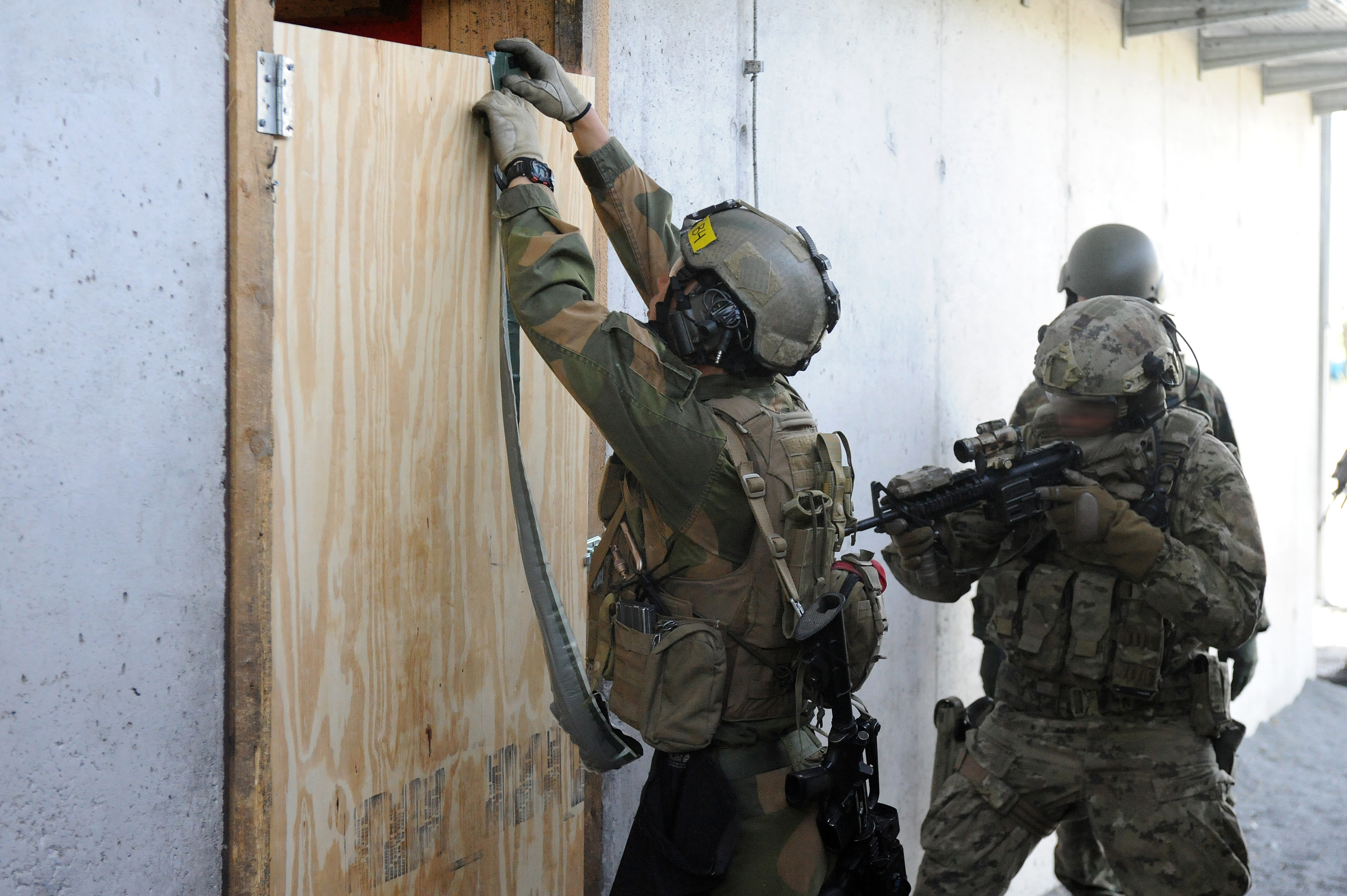
Placing an explosive breaching charge on a door, positioned to separate the door from its hinges

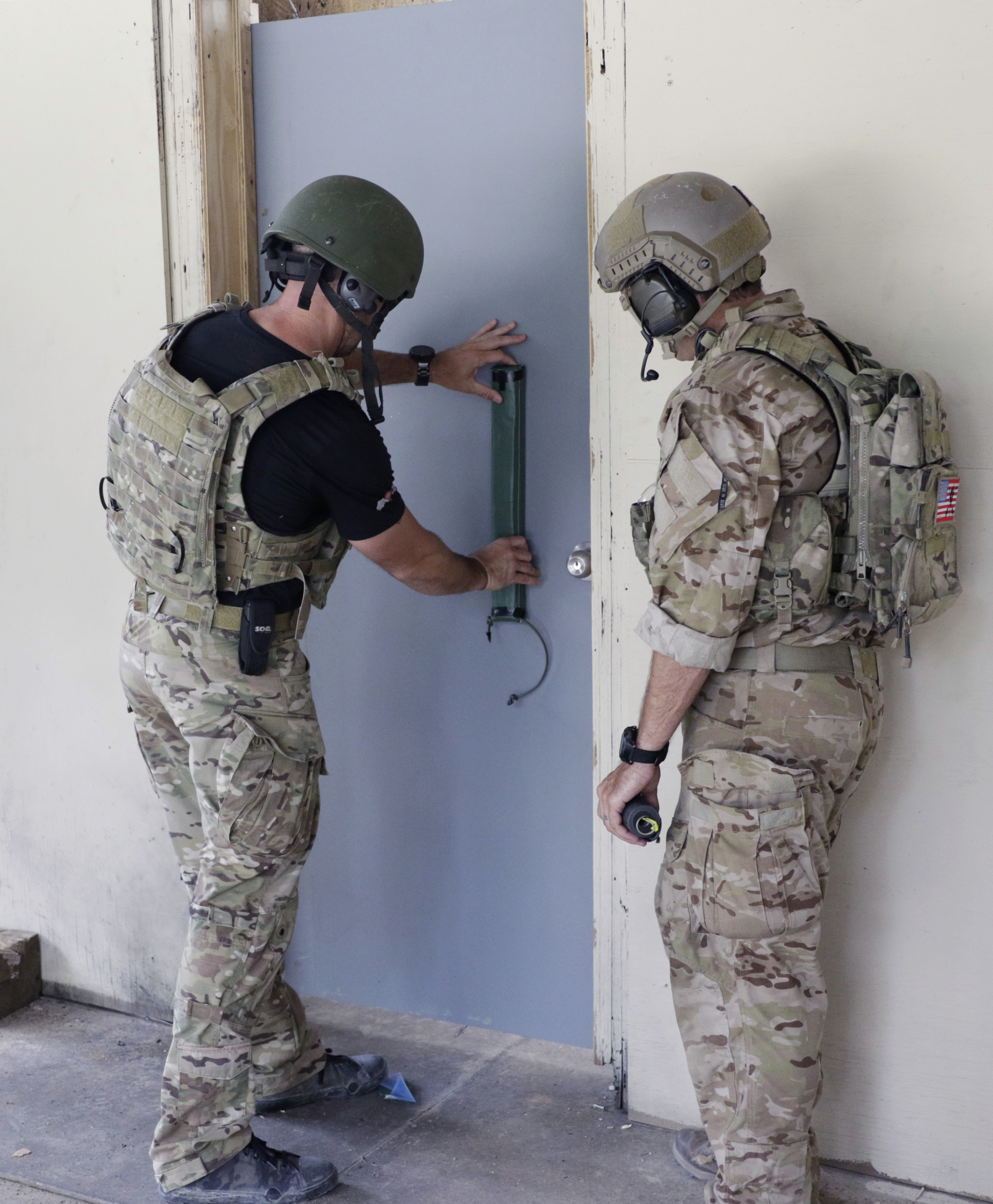
Explosive breach training at the John F. Kennedy Special Warfare Center and School

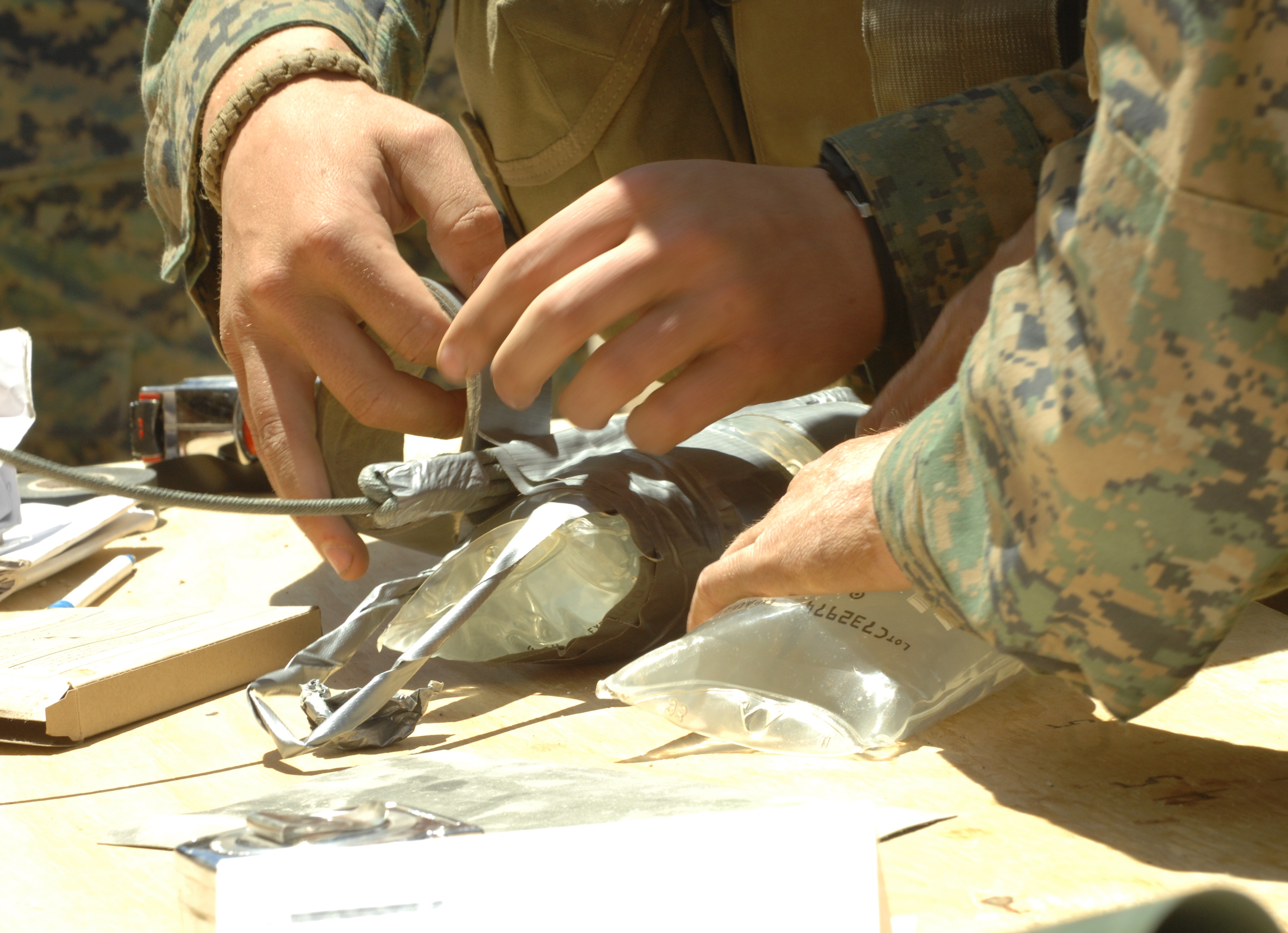
Preparing a water charge – coiled det cord taped to an IV bag.

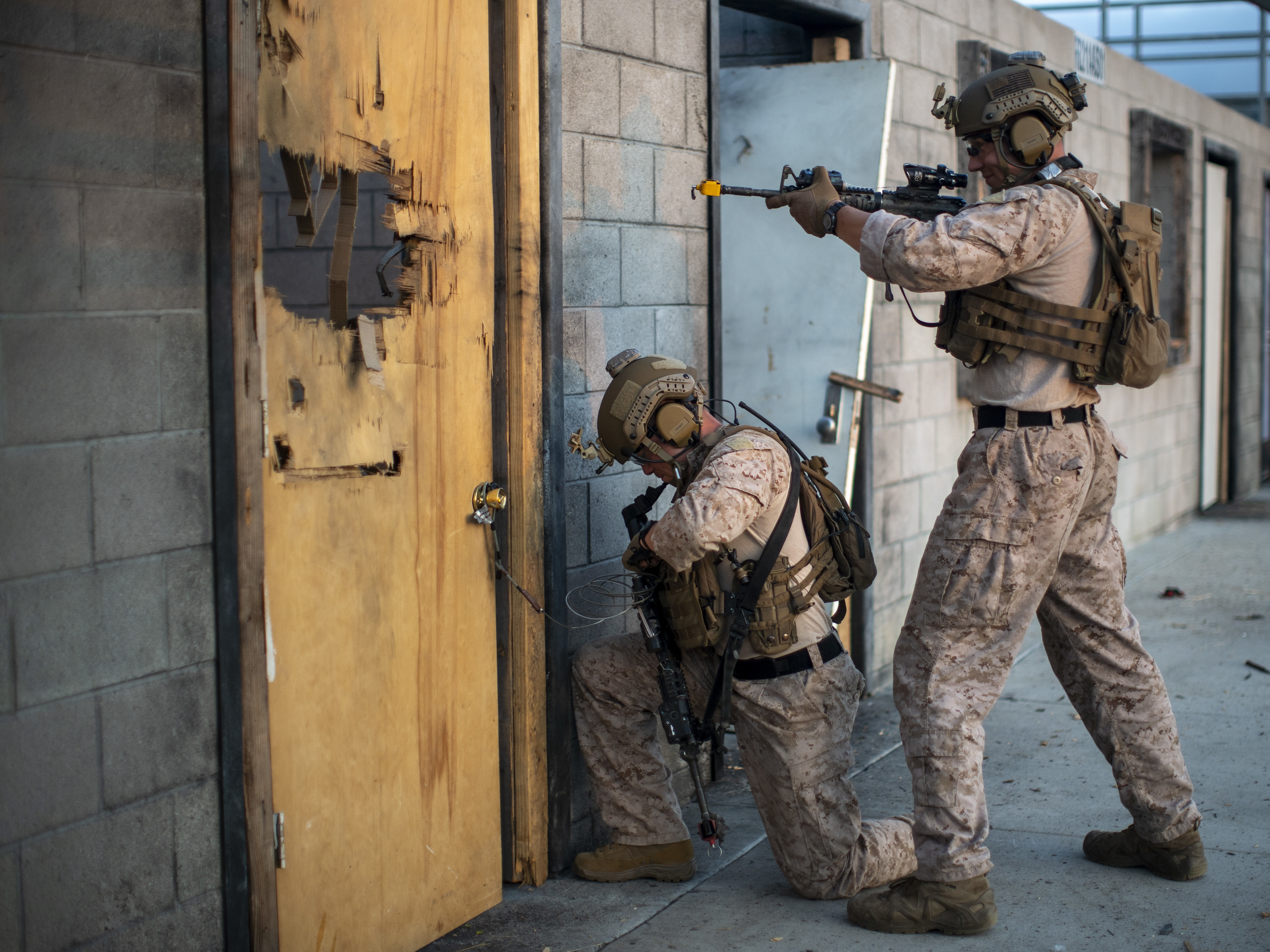
A doorknob charge being placed

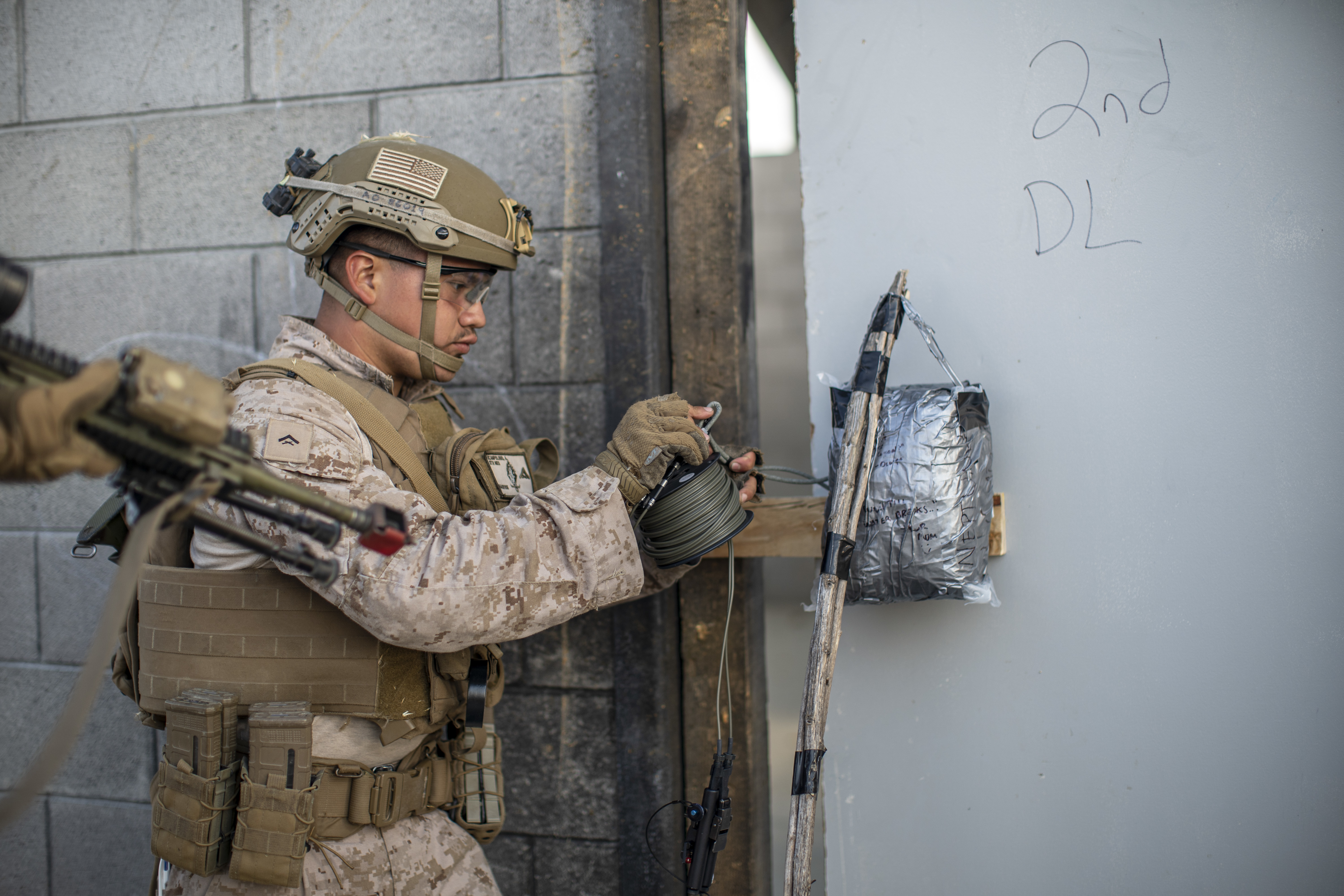
A heavier charge being supported with a prop stick

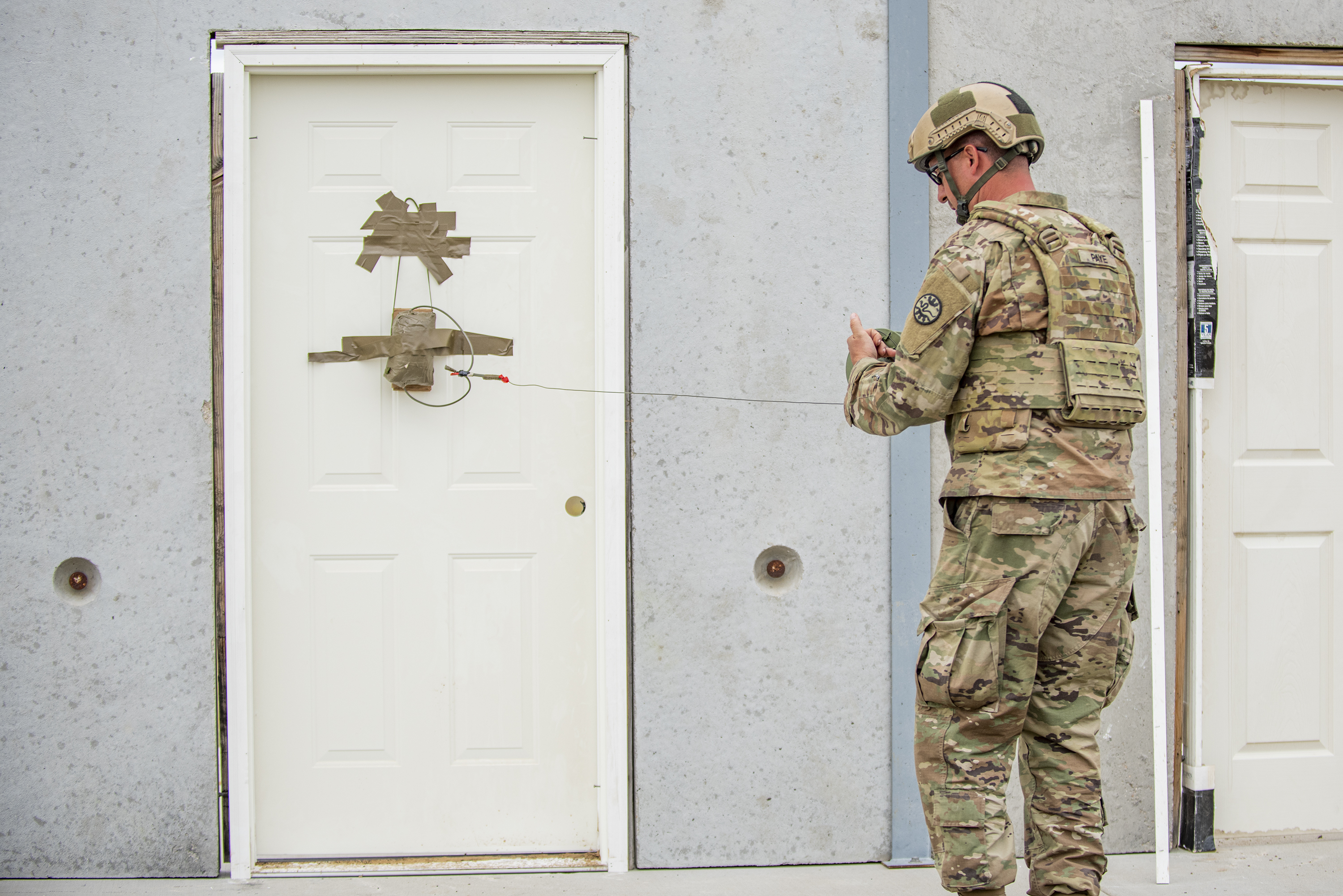
Uncoiling detcord from an explosive charge

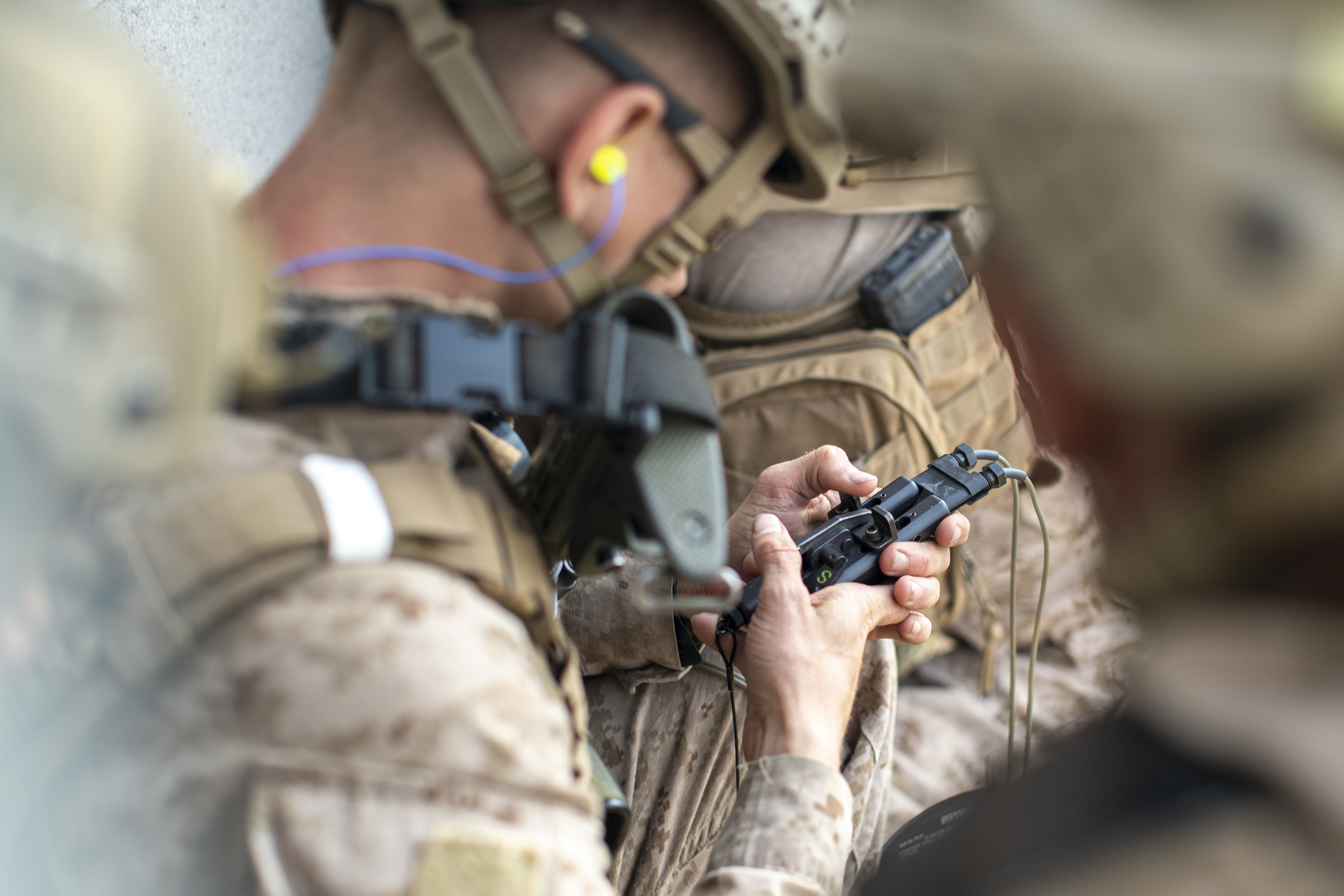
Preparing to detonate a breach charge

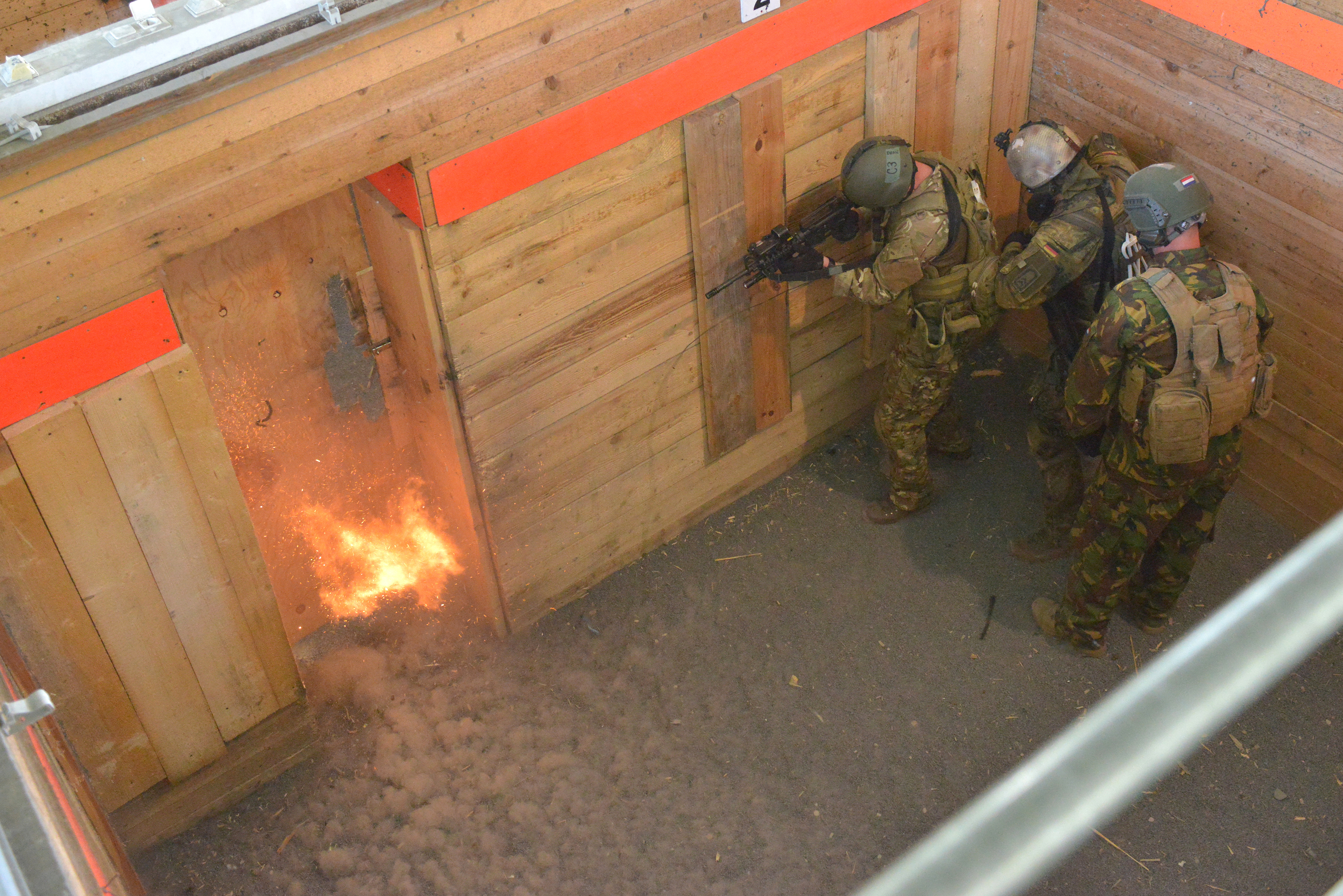
Explosive breaching within a structure, particularly dangerous

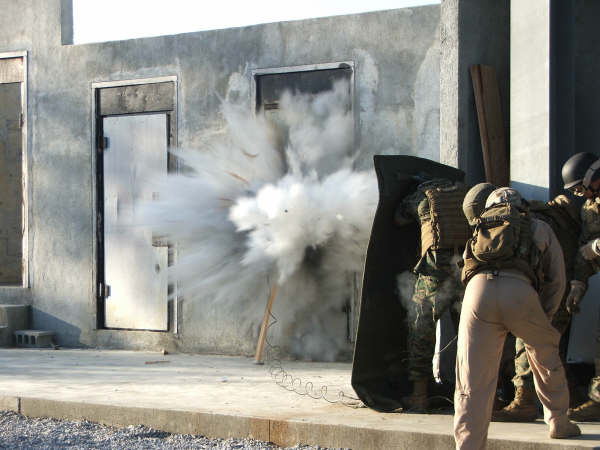
Marines covered behind a blast blanket during a breach

A US M100 Grenade Rifle Entry Munition (a SIMON derivative) detonates against a door
Thermal breaching

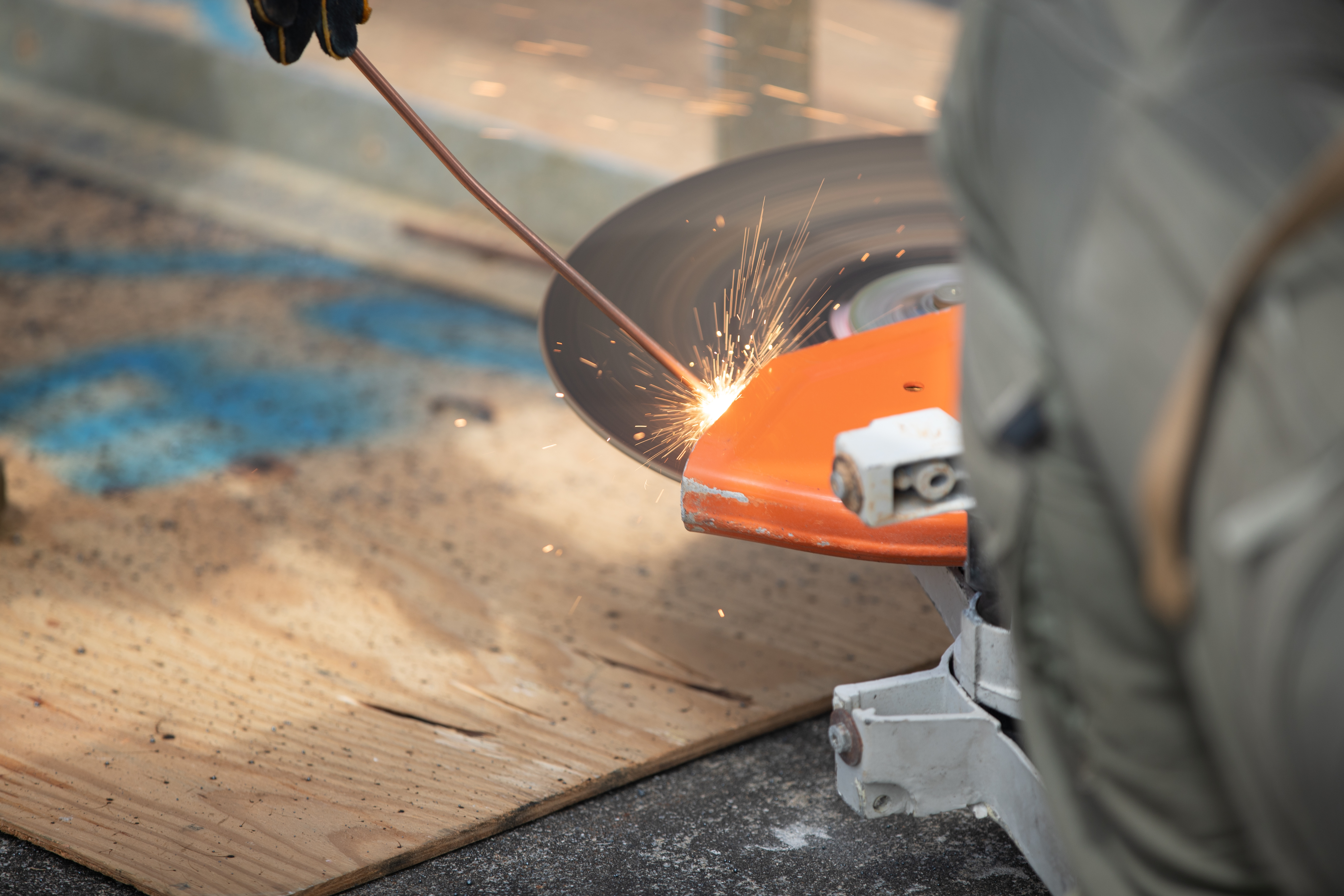
Striking a thermal breaching rod against a circular saw to ignite it

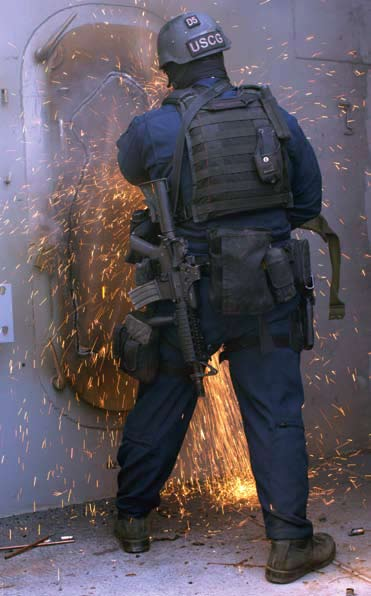
A member of the U.S. Coast Guard Maritime security Response Team uses a torch to cut through a ship's watertight door

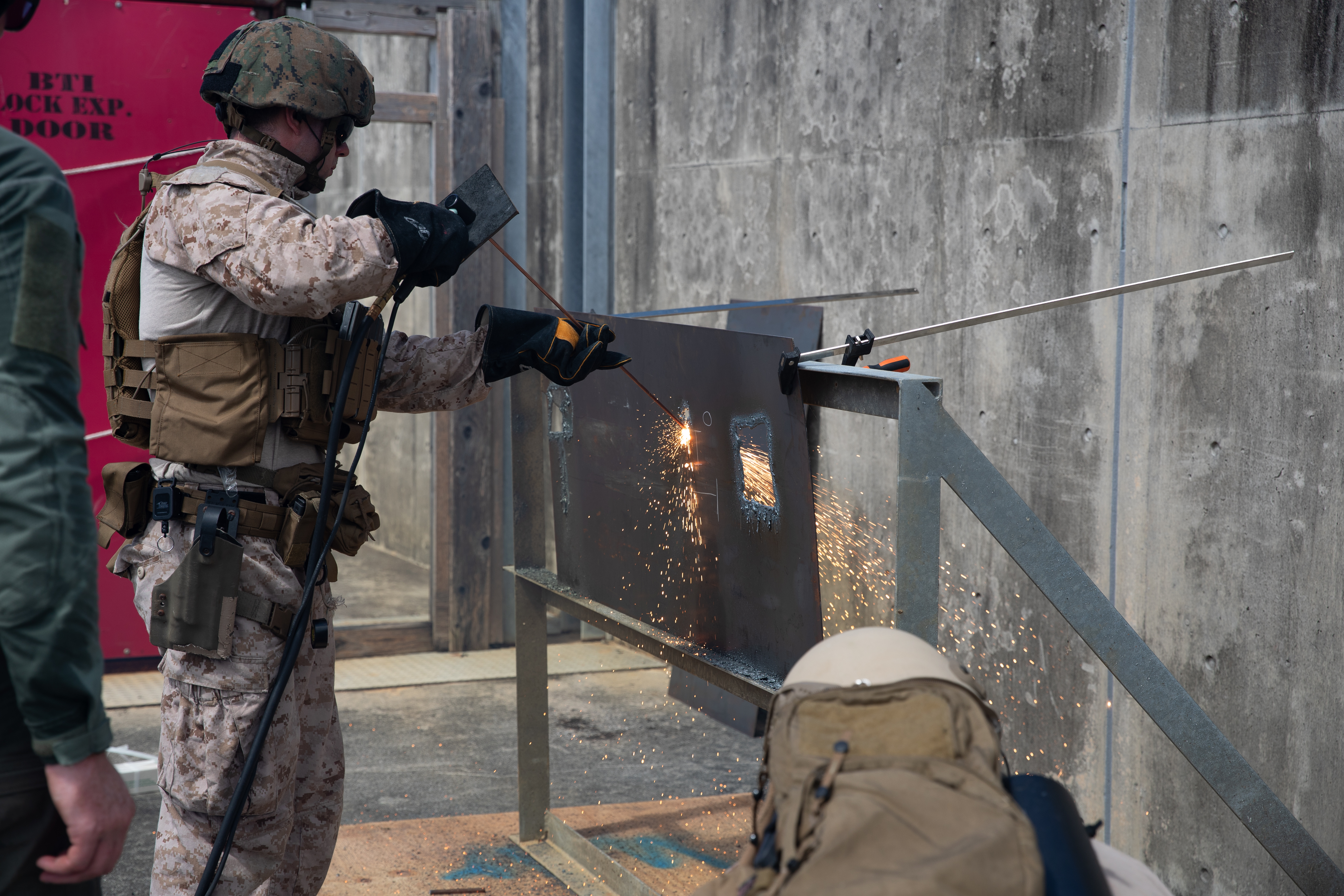
Marines practicing thermal breaching

== See also ==
- Hydraulic rescue tools
- Mouse-holing
- No-knock warrant
- Petard
- Glass breaker
