= Officer's tool =

Device for forced entry through a door lock

An officer's tool (also known as an A-tool, rex tool, or lock puller) is a forcible entry device used by firefighters and other first responders. Officer's tools are designed to completely remove cylindrical locks from doors without causing major structural damage, allowing for direct access to the internal locking mechanism.

Officer's tools can be used on any type of cylindrical lock, including rim locks, police locks, dead-bolts, or key-in-the-knob locks. A door that has had its lock cylinder removed can be outfitted with a new one afterward with only minor cosmetic damage, making officer's tools a less destructive alternative to other forcible entry devices like fireman's axes and battering rams.

== Design and usage ==
An officer's tool is composed of two primary sections: a heavily padded metal handle, and a two-sided metal head. One side of the head terminates in a flat striking surface, while the other features two metal prongs that taper outward. The angle of the prongs resembles an upper-case letter A, hence the name "A-tool". Individual firefighters and fire departments may make modifications to officer's tools based on the types of locks and doors found in their area. A common modification involves adding metal spikes and forks to one end of the tool, similar to a Halligan bar.

To remove a cylindrical lock from a door using an officer's tool, a user positions the head of the tool so that the exposed portion of the lock cylinder is directly between the tool's prongs. The user then holds the tool at a slight angle and hits the striking surface with a blunt object until it is firmly wedged in place around the lock. At this point, the lock cylinder can be pulled out of the door by using the handle of the officer's tool as a lever.

The door will still be locked after the lock cylinder is removed, as the internal locking mechanism will still be intact. Many officer's tools come with shove knives capable of manipulating the locking mechanism directly, which ultimately unlocks and opens the door.

Officer's tools are designed to cause minimal damage to doors and their internal locking mechanisms during the process of removing a lock cylinder. This is especially useful for doors that cannot be broken down easily or safely, such as those made of glass or outfitted with iron bars.

A similar device, the smaller K-tool, is also capable of removing lock cylinders from doors. K-tools can be used on locks that are too small or narrow to remove with an officer's tool, or on locks that are so flush with a door that the prongs of an officer's tool cannot grip it properly.

== See also ==
- Door breaching
- Halligan bar
