= Battering =

Battering can refer to:

- Batter (cooking)
- Battery (crime)
- Battering ram

== See also ==
- Domestic violence
