= Enforcer (battering ram) =

Battering ram used by British police

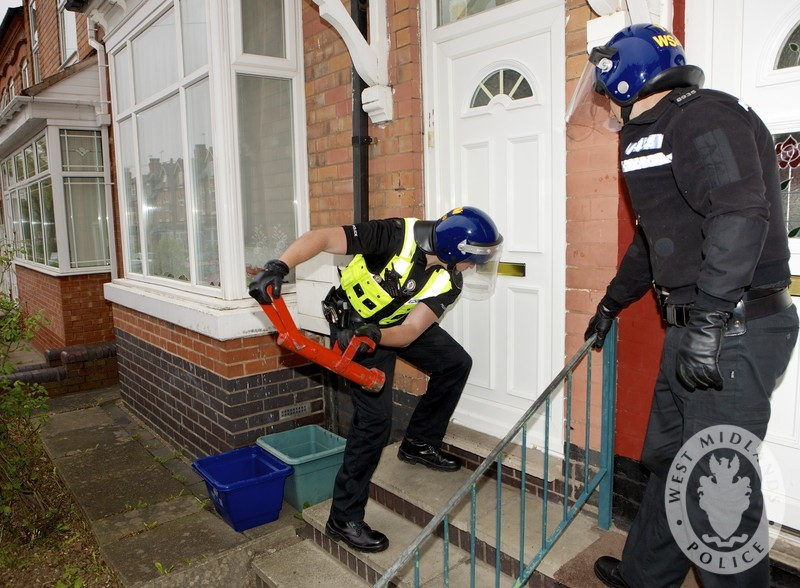
An Enforcer ram of the West Midlands Police in use during Operation Intrusive, 2013

Enforcer (also known informally as a "Rammit", "the Sam", "Donker", "Sam", "Bosher" and "the big red key") is the term given to a specially designed manual battering ram manufactured by Sigma Security Devices Ltd and currently used by British police and armed forces, fire services and other agencies to aid in gaining entry to premises.

== Construction ==
The Enforcer is a 16 kg (35 lb) hardened steel construction with a steel pad at the impact end so that it can absorb the impact, and a handle at the opposite end angled so that the user can swing accurately at inward-opening doors without actually applying their own pressure more than necessary. There is a handle in the middle of the tube aiding the user in handling. The Enforcer can apply more than three tonnes of impact force to door locks. It is 58 cm (23 in) long.

== Police use ==
In London, the Metropolitan Police Services' Armed Response Vehicles and most station vans carry them. Within most forces, an officer can only use such a tool once they have attended a course receiving training in the safe handling and operational use. Most forces also insist that the user wears gloves to cushion their hands from the shock created when a door is struck with the ram.
