= SIMON breach grenade =

Israeli door breaching rifle grenade

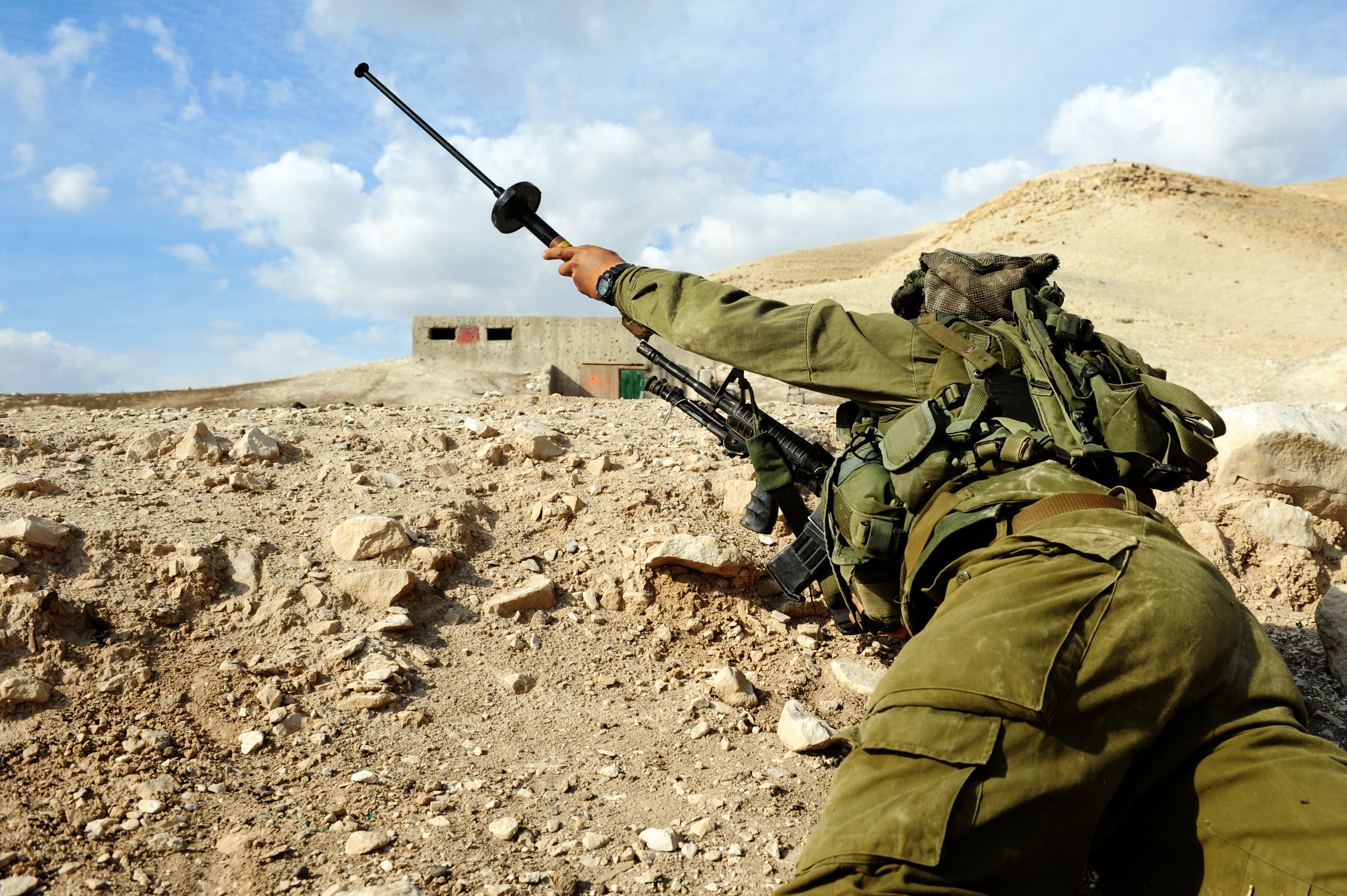
IDF soldier with a SIMON rifle grenade

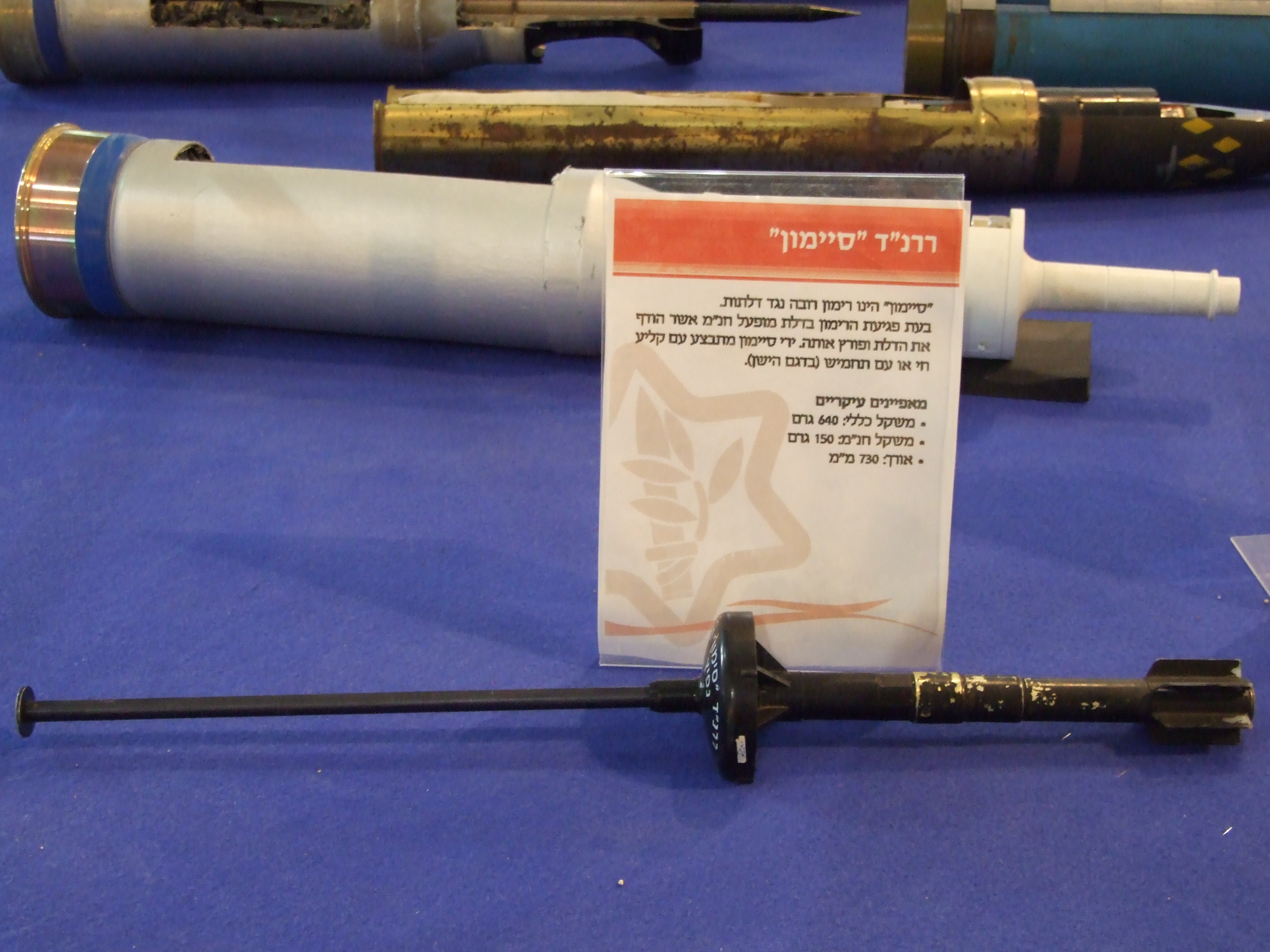
SIMON rifle grenade close up (bottom)

Video of U.S. troops using GREM (Simon) rifle grenade system

The SIMON is an Israeli bullet-trap rifle grenade designed to breach through doors, developed by Rafael Advanced Defense Systems. It is intended for use with 5.56 mm rifles such as the M4 carbine.

== Overview ==
The system consists of a bullet-trap tail section which slides over the muzzle of the rifle, an explosive midsection and a front standoff rod. The grenade is propelled by a normal ball or tracer round to a maximum range of 30 m (98 ft) and is detonated by the impact of the standoff rod against the door to be breached, the standoff distance allowing the blast wave to affect as much of the door surface as possible, negating any need to aim for hinges or locks.

A version which is manually attached to the door is also available, known as "static SIMON".

== Specifications ==
- Weight: 640 g (23 oz) (including standoff rod)
- Length:
  - Standoff rod: 400 mm (16 in)
  - Overall: 730 mm (29 in)
- Warhead diameter: 100 mm (3.9 in)
- Explosive fill:
  - SIMON 150: 150 g (5.3 oz)
  - SIMON 120: 120 g (4.2 oz)
- Range: 15–30 m (49–98 ft)

== Operators ==
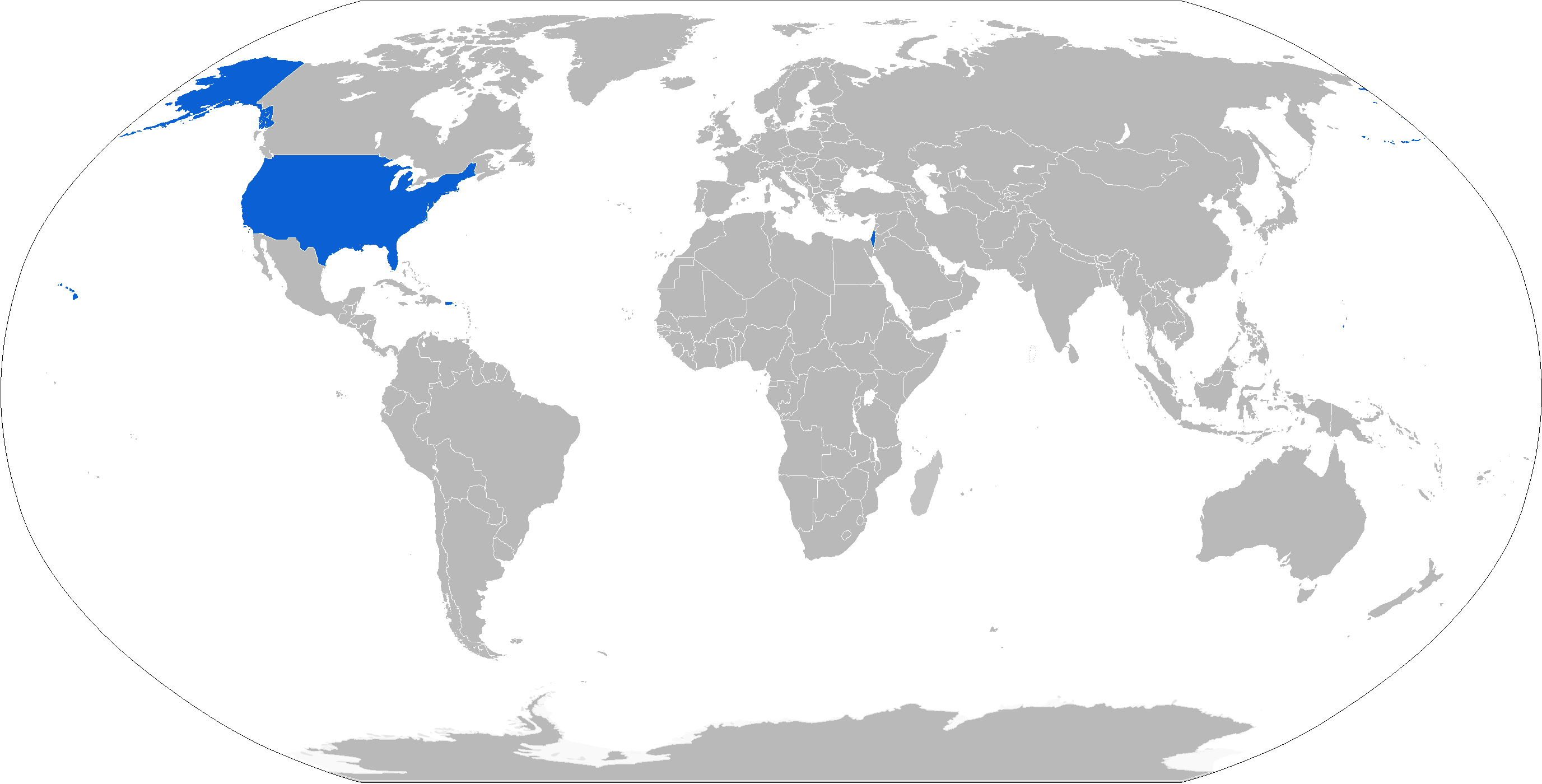
Map with SIMON operators in blue

=== Current operators ===
- Israel
- United States - A variant of the SIMON 120 is in service with the U.S. Army as the M100 Grenade Rifle Entry Munition (GREM). Changes from the original specification involved fuzing and reliability issues. An inert round, the M101 GREM-Target Practice (GREM-TP) allows training for accuracy without the explosive hazard. The system was given a U.S. Army award as one of the top ten best inventions of 2005.
- Belgium - Used by the Belgian Federal Police Special Units supported by the French GIGN during an anti-terrorism raid in Verviers (Belgium) in 2015.
