= The pig (tool) =

Firefighting tool

- Classification: Striking tool
- Inventor: Chris Moren
- Manufacturer: Lonestar Axe LLC

The pig is a specialty firefighting tool used mainly for roof ventilation, forcible entry and wall breaching. Invented by a member of the Austin Fire Department, the tool combines the butt-end of a flat head axe on one side and a pick on the other. The pig can be married with a Halligan to create a forcible entry system as an alternative to the classic axe and Halligan combination.
