= Lock bypass =

Lockpicking technique

A lock bypass is a technique in lockpicking, of defeating a lock through unlatching the underlying locking mechanism without operating the lock at all. It is commonly used on devices such as combination locks, where there is no natural access (such as a keyhole) for a tool to reach the locking mechanism. Because the mechanism itself is not being manipulated, this could technically not be considered lockpicking at all. However, it does fall under the repertoire of techniques used to open locks. Lock bypass is one of the most important parts of locksmithing, especially with respect to public buildings which must be able to be opened from inside in case of fire, thus allowing the use of "letter box tools" among other techniques. Locks may be bypassed by a variety of other techniques including loiding, i.e. the "credit card" technique, against self-closing "latch systems."

Padlocks may be bypassed by shimming, where one inserts a sprung steel device to retract the spring-loaded catch that restrains the shackle. Locked cars may be bypassed by introducing a stiff wire (also known as a "slim jim") between the door and the cars structure to operate internal unlocking catches. The previous method may be assisted by gently prying the door from the frame with an air wedge or lever.

To avoid bypass, a door should be secured using a deadbolt system, in which the locking mechanism and bolt are operated by the key. This prevents the device from being opened without the locking mechanism itself being properly operated.
