= Shim (lock pick) =

Lock picking device used to bypass traditional spring loaded padlocks

A shim is a tool that is used to bypass padlocks. It works by retracting the spring-loaded catch that restrains the shackle. Like other types of lockpicks, shims can be professionally made or improvised out of easily available materials like aluminum cans.

Higher security padlocks typically use techniques that make shimming impossible. The most common being the use of ball bearings instead of a spring-loaded catch, noticeable because the indentations on the shackle are round instead of wedge-shaped.
