= Shove knife =

Forcible entry tool used mainly by firefighters

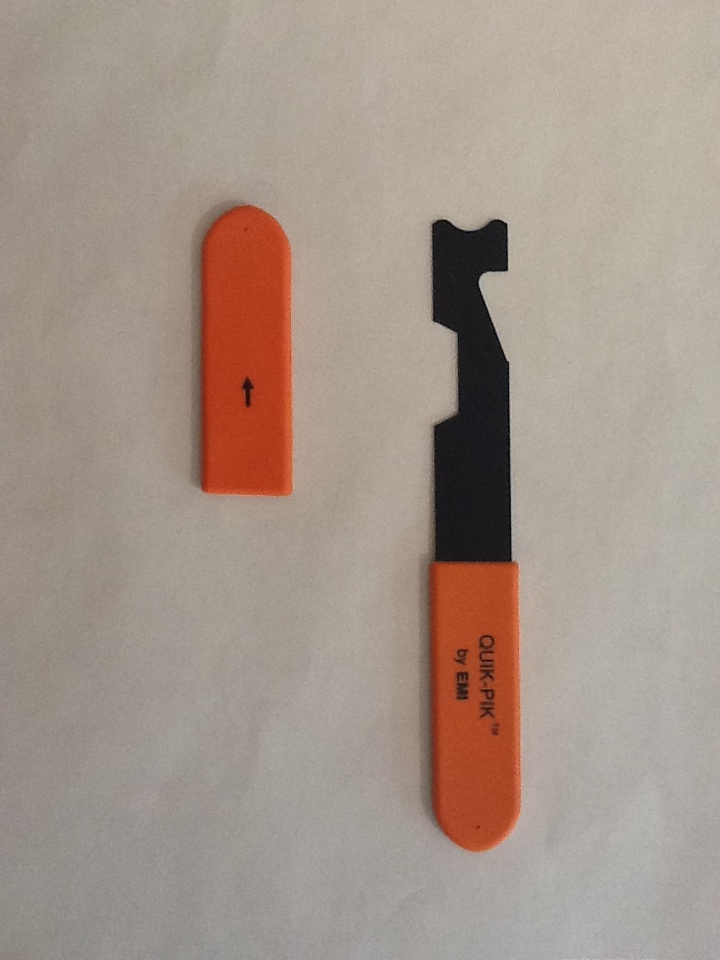
Quik-Pik EMI Shove Knife, June 2012

A shove knife is a forcible entry tool used mainly by firefighters. Generally, they consist of a small, semi-rigid piece of 10 gauge steel with an indented end. The device is inserted between a door and the door frame, above the spring latch on outwardly-swinging doors equipped with key-in-the-knob locks. The tool is pulled down and outward, releasing the locking mechanism.
