= Glossary of firefighting equipment =

This is a glossary of firefighting equipment.

== A ==
Adapter
Fitting for connecting hose couplings with dissimilar threads but with the same inside diameter. See also reducer, increaser, double male, double female. May contain combinations, such as a double-female reducer. Adapters between multiple hoses are called wye, Siamese, or distributor, which see below.
Air pressurized water (APW) fire extinguisher
A hand held fire extinguisher using water for the extinguishing agent which is expelled by compressed air. Wetting agents may be added to the water and AFFF foam can be used in similar extinguishers.
Automatic distress signal unit (ADSU)
An alarm device that signals that a firefighter is in trouble. It can be activated manually by the firefighter, or activates automatically if the firefighter stops moving. May be integral to SCBA or separately activated. Also known as a PASS device (personal alert safety system) or PDA (personal distress alarm).
Aerial fire apparatus
Fire truck, meeting National Fire Protection Association (NFPA) Standard 1901, Motor Fire Apparatus, Chapter 6 and Chapter 18, having a multi-section extending ladder, raised using power shifted from the truck's propulsion engine. May also carry other portable ladders and tools.
Aerial ladder
A rotating, power-operated (usually hydraulically) ladder mounted on a self-propelled automotive fire apparatus.
Aerial ladder platform
A hydraulic aerial device which combines an aerial ladder with a personal carrying platform supported at the end of a ladder.
Air monitoring meter
Electronic device for measuring the presence of one or more chemicals in air, such as oxygen, carbon monoxide, hydrogen sulfide or volatile organic compounds; may have preset danger threshold alarms.
Airbag
1. inflatable device used for lifting or spreading
2. vehicle safety device with potential explosion hazard during vehicle extrication if not already blown.
Airpack
Jargon for self-contained breathing apparatus (SCBA).
Apparatus
Fire apparatus is divided into seven categories by NFPA Standard 1901: Pumper Fire Apparatus, Initial Attack Apparatus, Mobile Water Supply Apparatus, Aerial Apparatus, Quint Fire Apparatus, Special Service fire apparatus, and Mobile Foam fire apparatus. Each category is defined in detail by the NFPA Standard that applies to all fire apparatus in the United States. Note: There is no separate category for Rescue Truck; rescue trucks are covered under Special Service Apparatus.
Appliance
Term for fire suppression equipment used by firefighters to manage or direct a water stream.
APW
Air-pressurized water fire extinguisher, partially filled with water and then pressurized with an air pump; popular in the US in the 2½-gallon size, rated 2A. See APW fire extinguisher.
Aqueous film-forming foam (AFFF)
(pronounced "A-Triple-F", also called "Class B"): bubbles that act as surfactant to coat and penetrate ordinary fuels (e.g., wood, paper) to prevent them from burning at normal temperatures; also used on "Class B" (oil/gasoline) fires to spread a non-volatile film over the surface of the fuel. Applied using eductor or compressed air foam system (CAFS) and pumped through fire hose to a foam nozzle (or sometimes a less-effective fog nozzle).
Attack hose
(Attack line) A use classification of a fire fighting hose connected to output of a pump or other pressure source (e.g., gravity). Fire hose used to apply water or other fire fighting agent directly to a fire or burning substance. Typically of 2 1/2 inches (64 mm) diameter or less in the United States. Historically 1.5 inch hose was the primary initial attack line but has been supplanted in most of the US by 1.75-inch-diameter (44 mm) hose that carries 175 gallons per minute. Two-inch hose is available as an option.
Attic ladder
Narrow, collapsible ladder used to access an attic space via a scuttle hole, which are often found in closets and other narrow passages. Also known as a closet ladder, folding ladder or "pencil ladder." Required to be carried on pumpers by NFPA 1901.
Automatic sprinkler
System of pipes serving fire sprinklers, for automatically directing water to a fire when the sprinkler is heated to its actuation temperature (usually 155 deg F). The piping may be normally pressurized with water ("wet") or with air ("dry"), depending upon the application. When a sprinkler-head (or heat sensor) detects heat from a fire, the sprinkler opens, automatically spraying water onto the fire area.

== B ==
BA
Royal Navy abbreviation for breathing apparatus.
Bomb line
A preconnected attack line, typically 2½ inch in diameter, used in the same manner and purpose as a trash line. Bomb lines are stored either on the front bumper of the apparatus or in an exterior (exposed) side well. Bomb lines are typically shorter length than cross-lays, and are intended for use against dumpster fires, etc., where a longer length of hose (and consequent rebedding after the suppression is complete) is not desired.
Booster hose
Small-diameter fire hose (3/4–1 inch), often carried on booster reel, preconnected to pump of an engine (and the booster tank) for putting out small fires near the truck without having to connect to a fire hydrant; easily recovered with a motorized reel. Also known as "red line" for the common red rubberized outer layer. Booster hose is also used for high pressure fog (HPF) applications.
Branch pipe
See Nozzle. There are many types of branch pipes (nozzles) available, depending on situation and scene of fire, one of them is selected. They are named:
1. Simple: Creates a simple jet as per size of diameter of nozzle.
2. Diffuser: The nozzle of branch pipe rotates. If we rotate it to one side, it creates a spray of water; and at the end of rotation, it gives a water curtain to protect the firefighters when direction of wind changes while fighting a fire. Rotated the other direction, it will produce a jet of water; and at the end of rotation the water will be shut off. The shut off option can not be used for a long time as line is charged with pressure and it may burst the hose line.
3. Landon hand control diffuser: This branch is fitted with a handle. Moving handle we get fog, spray, jet and shut off.
4. Water mist: This branch pipe gives a water mist.
5. Revolving: The ball shape head of the branch pipe is fitted with many small nozzles pointing in different directions and the head rotates when water passes through it. This creates a rotating jet at different angles. It is used for fighting a ship fire or enclosed shaft fire.
6. Duck bill nose: The nozzle is shaped like a duck's bill, hence it is named as duck bill nose branch pipe. When water passes through this branch pipe it creates a water curtain, used to create a water curtain in between two buildings so the fire of one building can not spread to its very close neighboring building.
Bresnan cellar nozzle
Rotating nozzle tip having two or more outlets forming water jets that propel the tip while spraying water in a circular pattern; conveniently attached to several feet (a meter) of rigid pipe with handles or legs for supporting the nozzle while it is suspended through a hole in the floor above.
Bulk tank
Large tank designed to be transported to an incident and left; larger than a tote tank.
Bunkers (or "bunker gear")
Colloquial term for protective pants and boots kept near a firefighter's bunk (cot) for rapid deployment; more modernly includes firefighting jacket. Basis for command to "bunker up!" in preparation for hazardous duties. May also refer to entire protective clothing ensemble. Also known as "turnouts" or "turnout gear."

== C ==
Cellar pipe
Cellar nozzle. The Bresnan nozzle is a distributing type nozzle that is inserted through an opening in the floor and into the space below, typically a basement or cellar. The nozzle directs a broken stream horizontally, either extinguishing or controlling the fire enough to allow a direct attack to be safely made. The Baker cellar pipe consists of a smoothbore, straight stream nozzle on the end of a brass pipe 36-inches long or more that can be remotely angled from the floor above by firefighters to direct the stream to the desired cellar location.
Charged line
Fire hose under pressure from the pump at the engine.
CFA 3-thread
A type of coupling used by the CFA, it is used mainly on the Australian 64 mm hose. It provides a very secure coupling - the threading of the coupling is repeated 3 times. It is non-hermaphrodite.
Check valve
See Backflow preventer
Cistern
Underground water storage tank that is intended for firefighting use in areas with inadequate water supply.
Class A, B, C, D, K
Classes of fire extinguisher and corresponding type of fire they extinguish.
Claw tool
Early striking and prying tool.
Closed-circuit SCBA
See SCBA.
Closet hook
Pike pole under 5 ft long
Closet ladder
See Attic ladder.
CO_{2} extinguisher
Fire extinguisher that releases carbon dioxide gas to displace oxygen to smother and cool a fire, such as a flammable liquid.
Combination nozzle
A low pressure fog nozzle (usually 120 to 150 lbf/in² or 820 to 1030 kPa that can be adjusted to produce a near straight stream. Also commonly referred to as a Taskforce tip (TFT).
Compressed air foam system (CAFS)
A water / surfactant (foam) mixture, with compressed air forced into the mix. The result is a very homogeneous, small "air bubble" distribution; the resulting suppression agent is the consistency of soggy shaving cream, consisting of relatively pure surface area and little actual water. CAF is gaining favor in selected compartmental fire scenarios because of its high (explosive) conversion rate, on top of the penetrative advantages of the surfactant. It is also inappropriate for many fire scenarios because of that conversion rate, as an unmanaged steam expansion path may cook the firefighters. Secondary advantages are a graceful degradation during equipment failure; CAFs, without a compressed air supply, emit classic foam; without foam, water!
Cooper hose jacket
A Cooper hose jacket is a clamping device made out of metal, and is designed to clamp around leaking or burst hose sections. It can also be used to connect two hoses with incompatible couplings, e.g. different threads or sizes.

== D ==
Deck gun
A master stream device mounted to top deck of pumper.
Delivery
Term for any hose that conveys water to a fire e.g., each outlet from a fire appliance supplies a delivery with water.
Deluge gun
A master stream device that can be positioned on the ground based on the need of the incident commander.
Deluge system
Type of sprinkler system where sprinkler heads do not have individual valves, and the water (or other extinguishing agent) is disbursed from all sprinkler heads simultaneously when a central (or zoned) valve is triggered by a sensor (or manually). This is typically reserved for industrial areas where rapid fire spread must be prevented at the cost of damaging non-burning materials.
Denver door opener
Heavy pry bars connected with a hinge, one with an adjustable foot, used for prying open doors.
Denver tool
(also called TNT tool): A combination axe, sledgehammer, pry tool, ram, and D-handle pull tool used to gain forcible entry to buildings, automobiles, etc. during emergency situations.
Detection system
See Alarm system.
Detergent foam
See Aqueous film-forming foam.
Distributor pipe
Portion of fire hydrant or sprinkler system connecting main loops to smaller loops where outlets are located.
Divisional valve
A valve isolating a segment of a (usually underground) piping system. This may be useful for dealing with impairments or maintenance.
Double female
Fire hose adapter for connecting two "male" couplings together; may also adapt different sizes on either side.
Double-headed standpipe
A pipe that screws directly into the main water supply that has two outlets on each side.
Double male
Hose coupling adapter with two male-threaded connectors back-to-back; used for connecting two female couplings together.
Dry chemical
A fire extinguishing agent. It works by breaking the chemical chain reaction in the "fire tetrahedron".
Dry hydrant
A fire hydrant with a valve located at the bottom of the barrel, near the water main. The barrel of the hydrant remains dry until used. The prevents the hydrant from freezing in sub-zero temperatures. A dry hydrant is also an unpressurized pipe that can be used to draft (or draw) water from a pond or lake.
Dry powders
Fire extinguishing agents for use on flammable metals. Each agent is typically designed for use on either a single metal or very similar metals.
Dry sprinkler
A sprinkler system having pressurized air (rather than water) in the distribution pipes until a heat-activated sprinkler head opens and releases the stored air pressure, which in turn opens the main water valve (and possibly an accelerator valve) to flow water to the open sprinkler(s); used where the protected premises are not heated during freezing temperatures.
DSU
Distress signal unit, another term for a type of PASS device.

== E ==
Eckert hook
Sharp hook on pike pole for cutting metal siding or roofs.
Engine
A vehicle outfitted for firefighting, specifically one outfitted to pump water. Many rural fire engines carry a reservoir of water to pump, and use drafting and water tenders to obtain further supply. Historically, an engine ("enjin" or other spellings) was any kind of machine, tool or "contrivance". The hand squirts and manual pumps used to spray water onto a fire (an advancement from a bucket brigade) were types of engines in this obsolete sense of the word and are the origin of the modern term fire engine.
Eductor
Venturi device through which water flows under 200 psi pressure to create a partial vacuum in a tube attached at 90-degrees and open to the water stream passing overhead. The vacuum draws liquid foam concentrate from a reservoir, which mixes with the water stream through a metering device on the discharge side of the eductor where a firefighting hose is connected. Typically the 200 psi inlet water pressure is reduced to 95 psi discharge pressure as a result of the narrowness of the venturi in the eductor device.
Ejector
See Smoke ejector.
Ejector pump
Pumps that use the venturi principle to pump water on a fire ground. Can be used for salvage by removing flood waters or supply water to a fire appliance from an open water source. Water in the appliance is used to supply a flow of water to the ejector pump, which uses high pressure nozzles to entrain an increased volume of water in the hose returning to the fire appliance.
Elevator key
control panel override key to take elevator car to desired floor. May also refer to special tool used to open elevator shaft-protection doors from outside.
Encapsulated suit
HAZMAT protective clothing used with SCBA inside the suit to protect a firefighter (HAZMAT technician) from gaseous contaminants. Also known as a Gas Suit.
Encoder
1. Device for converting an input to a coded output
2. tone-generating system for broadcasting one or more tone codes on a radio frequency to alert selected pagers and alarms
3. alarm-system component that transmits coded sensor and subscriber information to a monitoring center to be processed into address and alarm-type information.
Extension ladder
A 20–60-foot ladder with one or more movable sections that extend beyond a base section, generally using a halyard rope and pulley mechanism for lifting and locking cams to latch the moving sections at a selected height.
Extinguisher
Device containing fire suppressant, often pressurized to expel suppressant when triggered by operator or an automatic release mechanism. Important to properly select type of extinguisher appropriate to type of material burning (wood, grease, electrical, etc.). May be portable or permanently installed for special suppression purposes, such as fires in recreational vehicles, boats, aircraft engines, restaurant exhaust hoods, or computer rooms.
Extractor
A heavy duty washing machine used to clean turnout gear. Due to the size and weight of turnout gear, specialty equipment that meets NFPA is required for cleaning it.
Extrication gloves
Gloves designed for vehicle extrication and other rescue applications, but not rated for fighting fires. They resemble mechanics gloves but are usually made from a stronger material, such as Kevlar, and designed to protect a firefighter's hands from cuts or scrapes that may occur from glass or metal fragments.

== F ==
Fire alarm control panel
System for receiving and announcing location of fire based upon input from smoke, flame or heat detectors, or manual call points or pull stations.
Fire axe
There are two main types of axes used in firefighting, a flathead axe, which has a single wedge for cutting into objects, and a pickhead axe, which has a cutting wedge on one side and a pointed pick on the other.
Fireboat
A specialized watercraft with pumps and nozzles designed for fighting shoreline and shipboard fires. A famous historical example is the “343”, widely recognised among firefighting circles, and the former record-setting vessel “Branddirektor Westphal” (Europe’s largest fireboat) delivers up to 120 000 L/min (reference: www.fifisystems.com).
Fire damper
This device is fixed in the ducts of the central air conditioning system to restrict the fire travel from one room to another. This device can be operated manually and/or automatically i.e. activated by fire alarm system or some other thermally activated instruments.
Fire department keys
Special keys provided to firefighters to access a Knox Box or other lockbox, located on some commercial buildings, containing additional keys required for entry or other safety features.
Fire extinguisher
See Extinguisher above.
Fire bike or firefighting motorcycle
A motorcycle that is equipped to fight fires or used as support. Commonly used in Japan.
Fire hose
See also hose, below.
Fire hydrant
See hydrant.
Fire pump
a pump installed in a building specifically for sprinkler and standpipe water systems.
Fire station alert system
fire department dispatching system using radio controls to activate remote signals at designated fire stations and to transmit emergency information via audio or digital channels.
Fire streams
Water (possibly mixed with foam) emitted at nozzle and directed at burning materials.
Fire train
A train that is designed to fight fires, typically includes large amounts of water storage and water cannons.
Fit 5
Handheld fire suppression device designed to be thrown into needed area. Fit stands for Fire Interruption Technology. Effective against Class A, B, or C fires.
FFFP
Fluoroprotein film forming foam.
Fly
The moving portions of an extension ladder.
Fog nozzle
A nozzle that discharges water in small droplets. Often, the nozzles are adjustable, permitting the pattern to range from a straight stream to a narrow fog to a wide fog stream. Can also be designed to automatically adjust pressure depending upon selected pattern.
Fog stream
A fire stream characterized by small droplets of water. The droplets are unable to travel very far, but absorb heat very quickly because of the high surface area they present.
Foot valve
Backflow preventer at inlet of suction hose used in drafting; helps avoid losing prime by keeping water from running back out of the suction hose.

== G ==
Glas-Master tool
brand of specialized vehicle extrication tool, most notably including a glass cutting saw for removal of automobile windshields.
Gamewell
brand of wind-up, fire alarm telegraph system for sending coded pulses to alert central alarm station of fire alarm activation; often still found in red boxes on street corners.
Gate valve
Control valve with a solid plate operated by a handle and screw mechanism. Rotating the handle moves the plate into or out of the waterway. (See also hydrant gate)
Gravity tank
Water storage tank for fire protection; arranged above protected area to provide flow of water by gravity when needed.
Green line
a garden hose.
Fire grenade
glass bottle filled with carbon tetrachloride or similar fire extinguishing fluid; meant to be thrown and shatter at base of fire to mix with air to produce non-combustible mixture; Similar to extinguishers made of glass fixtures with spring-loaded clapper released by heat-fusible link. Limited effectiveness, and phased out in the 1950s when better extinguishers became available.
Ground ladder
A portable ladder designed to rest on the ground. Compare aerial ladder and roof ladder.

== H ==
Halligan tool (or "Hooligan")
Prying tool with a claw at one end and a spike or point at a right angle to a wedge at the other end. It is used in combination with maul or flat-headed axe for forcing padlocks, doors and windows.
Halon
Chemical gas fire extinguishing or liquid agent for diminishing the combustion reaction rate by acting as a thermal ballast; used mainly in closed computer rooms, aircraft, and other high-value installations where corrosive chemicals or water extinguishers are judged inappropriate. Effective at low concentrations (5%) as compared with CO_{2} (34%). Being phased out with suitable replacements in most applications, with very restricted exemptions, due to international environmental concerns with this and other CFCs.
Halyard
Rope used on extension ladders to extend the fly sections. Also called Fly Rope.
Hand squirt
A historical device used to squirt water onto a fire by hand. Also called simply a squirt or a syringe, these are perhaps the simplest and most ancient form of fire extinguisher. Known from the times of the Roman Empire but not documented in Europe until the 16th century. A squirt is a long metal or wooden tube with a plunger holding water. Held by two men, a third man forced the water out of a nozzle with the plunger, all three working together to aim the stream of water. An air-pressurized-water fire extinguisher is similar but its water is expelled by the air pressure, it is held by one person, and a flexible hose makes aiming the water stream easy.
Handtub
A historical fire engine pumped by hand with the water supply held in a tub or cistern on the wagon, the water supply delivered by a bucket brigade. The similar terms hand pumper or hand engine may be a handtub or could have a suction hose drafting water from an external source rather than a tub, but still pumped manually.
Hard suction hose
A flexible rubber hose reinforced with a steel core to prevent collapse from atmospheric pressure when drafting; connected between the intake of a fire pump and a water supply and must be used when drafting. Also called hard hose, hard sleeve, or hard intake/suction hose.
Helmet
Developed in the early 19th century, the original firefighter helmets were felt caps and did nothing more than keep water off the firefighters' faces. Later editions of the fire helmet included leather, metal, and fiberglass, and most departments are currently using a form of plastic composite. More information under Bunker gear.
Higbee cut
Special cut at the beginning of the thread on a hose coupling that provides positive identification of the first thread to eliminate cross threading.
Higbee indicators
Notches or groves cut into coupling lugs to identify by touch or sight the exact location of the Higbee cut.
High pressure fog (HPF)
A suppression technique consisting of finely atomized water droplets at several hundred pounds per square inch of pressure. By far, one of the most efficient suppression techniques available. Advantages include a *very* high conversion rate, unmatched atmospheric cooling and control of thermal layers, very little wasted water (and consequent water damage), and the ease of managing a small diameter booster line (defined above) during application. Disadvantages are lack of distance, lack of penetration into various materials, and high risk of burns to the attack crew. HPF is quite popular in Europe, but was discarded in the U.S. due to different building construction and the resulting increase in disadvantages.
High-rise pack
Hose bundle prepared for carrying to a standpipe in a high-rise building, usually consisting of 50 or more feet of 1¾-inch hose and a combination nozzle.
Hook
forged steel hook at end of insulated pole of varying lengths; used for piercing and pulling building materials away from walls and ceilings. Similar to nautical gaff hook. Short hook with a pointed tip is a pike pole; longer hook on a San Francisco hook; two offset hooks on either side of tip is a universal hook; long p-shaped hook is a Boston rake for pulling plaster and lath; short hook with claw on opposite side of tip is either a gypsum hook or the narrower ceiling hook; pike pole with a short handle is a somewhat useless closet hook.
Hook and ladder
Originally the "hook and ladder" was a horse-drawn carriage which brought ladders and "hooks" (pike poles) to the fire location. Later the term "Hook-and-ladder truck" was used for early fire engines
Hose
flexible conduit for moving liquids under pressure; made of various materials including cotton, rubber or plastic (such as PVC); construction may be braided, woven, wrapped or extruded, often in layers (liner and jacket); hose construction and size differs according to its intended use (e.g., hard suction, attack, forestry, booster); typically stocked in standard lengths and coupled together with standardized fittings. See hose coupling.
Hose bed
part of fire engine (or hose wagon) where hose is stored for transport and easy access; stocked in layers or rows for quick selection of the desired length, diameter and type of hose; may include hoses "pre-connected" to pump outlets on the engine.
Hose bridge
mechanical ramps permitting vehicle tires to roll over top of hose without pinching or damaging the hose. Sudden hose-pinch can cause dangerous backpressures in a running hose and at the pump and release of the pinch can cause a staggering surge at the nozzle end.
Hose cart
See Hose wagon.
Hose coupling
rigid interlocking end-pieces on fire hose; used for connecting hose to hydrants or fire engine pumps and other hose appliances (nozzles, wyes, manifolds, strainers, etc.); standardized sizes and threads or other (non-threaded) pressure-sustaining interlocks (e.g., "Storz" or other "quarter-turn" connectors); lugs, cams, or pins are used to tighten and loosen couplings by hand or with a hose wrench.
Hose pack
A general term covering all types of hose configurations a person would carry to deploy.
Hose roller
rigid frame with rollers designed to fit over windowsill or roof parapet to prevent chafing as hose is pulled across it. Can also refer to a machine designed for rolling hoses in preparation for storage.
Hose strap
Strap or chain with a handle suitable for placing over a ladder rung used to carry and secure a hoseline.
Hose tower
structure for hoisting hoses to permit them to drain and dry.
Hose wagon
a handcart, vehicle, or trailer adapted for storing and hauling hose and related equipment; used by industrial fire brigades with large buildings, or where supplemental hoses are needed beyond that normally carried on a fire engine; also used for taking attack hose into a high-rise and for returning dirty, wet hose to the station instead of loading it onto the hose bed along with dirt and corrosive moisture. Vehicular hose wagon may carry 1,000 to 3,000 feet (910 m) of hose. May also include small booster pump.
Hose wrench
tool for holding hose couplings against opposite turning forces (tighten/loosen); may be one of several designs for different shapes of cleats or lugs on couplings (round, flat, recessed, etc.), and also of different sizes according to the couplings being handled, and come in various combinations to minimize the number of different tools necessary on the fire ground. Also known as a "Spanner wrench".
Hose vacuum
A small pneumatic vacuum generator that removes air from the inside of a fire hose, making it smaller and firm, and therefore easier to pack and less space-consuming.
HPF
See High pressure fog.
Hurst tool
See Hydraulic spreader.
Hux tool
Largely obsolete hydrant wrench made of stamped metal with holes sized for the hydrant valve.
Hydrant
pressurized water source for fire engine. May also be a "dry hydrant" for drafting from static water source. Compare "standpipe".
Hydrant assist valve
A valve connected to the hydrant by the first due engine allowing the second due engine to boost the pressure in the intake line. Used for hydrants with low pressure, attaching multiple engines to one hydrant, or boosting pressure in the intake line to accommodate for friction loss.
Hydrant gate
A gate valve used to control water flow through one of the discharge ports on a hydrant with two or more ports. Typically, one fire hose is initially connected to one discharge and the hydrant gate is connected to one or more of the other outlets. This allows a second hose to be connected to a hydrant that is flowing water without shutting down the main valve to make the connection.
Hydraulic platform
An aerial appliance with an elevating platform like a Cherry picker.
Hydrant wrench
Specially designed tool used to open or close a hydrant and to remove hydrant caps.
Hydraulic spreader (Jaws of Life)
mechanical levering device with hydraulic cylinders powered by a pump; used for forcible entry or spreading vehicle or structure parts to permit extrication of a victim. Also called Hurst Tool, which is a type that includes cutter and ram/jacking features.

== I ==
IDLH
Immediately Dangerous to Life or Health.
Increaser
Adapter used to attach a smaller diameter source hose to a larger diameter receiving hose.
Indian pump
(aka Indian tank) A brand of five-gallon water can, or back-pack bladder, featuring a short hose and hand pump for use in wildland firefighting.
Intake
Part of pump where water enters when pump forms partial vacuum.
In-line eductor
Eductor that is placed along the length of a hoseline.
Irons, or set of irons
Pairing of a flat-head axe and a Halligan tool. A common combination used in forcible entry operations.

== J ==
Jaws of Life
A Hurst tool. See hydraulic spreader.
J-Tool
A device made of rigid, heavy gauge wire and designed to fit through the space between double-swinging doors equipped with panic hardware.
Jet-Axe
A Jet-Axe was a shaped charge of two to six ounces of RDX, and was used for forcible entry and ventilation in the 1960s and 1970s.
Jet siphon
A venturi appliance used for moving large amounts of water from one reservoir tank to another by pumping a small amount of pressurized water into the jet to create a vacuum to move larger amounts of water.
Jockey pump
A small pump connected to a fire sprinkler system.

== K ==
K-tool
A forcible entry tool for removing cylinder locks; used with a Halligan bar.
Kelly tool
A prying tool much like a Halligan tool without the right-angle pointed tip.
Knox Box
A box secured to the outside (esp. of a commercial occupancy) containing master keys, accessible by a high-security key available to responding firefighters.

== L ==
Ladder truck
A truck outfitted with an apparatus-mounted aerial ladder, not necessarily outfitted to pump water. Not to be confused with engine. Known as a "Turntable Ladder" in the United Kingdom.
Ladder Tender
A large medium or heavy-duty truck usually consisting of multiple storage compartments, carrying equipment equal to the capabilities of a ladder truck company, but lacking the aerial ladder.
Ladder pipe
Nozzle attached to an aerial ladder and used to direct heavy stream from advantageous height.
Landing valve
Globe valves that are installed on hydrants, a branch and hose is connected to a coupling on it.
Large diameter hose
(LDH) Fire hose with a diameter of 3½ inches or greater. LDH is typically used to supply water from a fire hydrant to fire apparatus such as an engine or tanker.
Leatherhead (helmet)
a cover or protective device worn by fire fighters in some countries, also slang denoting a fire fighter.
Left-handed smoke shifter
A non-existent device used to haze probationary firefighters during an overhaul phase, as a snipe hunt. A crew chief sends his probie to fetch one, but no such device actually exists. Each truck the probie visits consequently does "...not have one", or "...another crew just took it", but each truck operator knows for certain that, "THAT truck might have one, over there..." The process repeats until the probie has been to each truck looking for the device, while the crew chief increasingly chides him to "hurry up" over the radio. This is similar to military non-objects such as 'relative bearing grease' or 'winter air' for tires, or a trainee nurse being asked to fetch a 'neck tourniquet'.
Level A, B protective clothing
Different levels of encapsulation of firefighters used during HAZMAT incidents to minimize contamination.
Life net
Portable net for attempting to catch victims falling or jumping from upper floors of burning structure.
Life safety line
A rope used where its failure could result in serious injury; a rope used for connecting a firefighter/rescuer to a fixed anchor point or to another person.
Light water
An additive to use with water in the extinguishing of petroleum and similar fires.
LMR
Abbreviation for land mobile radio. Component of New Zealand Fire Service communications system between a communications centre and a fire appliance over a radio network

== M ==
Medium-diameter hose
A hose with diameter between 2½ and 3 inches (76 mm).
Monitor
Firefighting delivery that is established and left unattended. Typical uses include ground monitors, which deliver water onto large fires or provide a water curtain. Also known as deluge guns, Deck Monitors tend to be attended and deliver large water volumes onto the fire.
Multigas detector
Measuring device designed to indicate concentrations of multiple (typically four) selected gases, such as oxygen, carbon monoxide, volatile organic compounds, hydrogen cyanide, etc.
MDT
Abbreviation for Mobile Data Terminal, typically a specialized laptop-style personal computer mounted in the cab of the apparatus, using a radio network for data transmission between communication centres and the apparatus crew. Often connected to computer-assisted dispatch system. May be used with a Global Positioning System receiver to locate apparatus and map routes to call locations.

== N ==
NH
National hose thread, also known as NST (National Standard Thread). Commonly used in fire hose couplings, it has a slightly larger thread diameter and coarser pitch (fewer threads per inch) than the alternative NPSH thread. The threads specified in NFPA 1963 are "NH".
NIFTI
Naval InFrared Thermal Imager. A device used aboard naval ships to help locate hotspots where fire or personnel may be located in a dense smoke environment.
Nozzle
A device attached to the end of a fire hose that directs, shapes and regulates the flow of the water or fire fighting agent pumped into the hose. May have a control valve. Can also be referred to as a branch pipe.
Nozzle tip
Portion of firehose that forms the fire stream as it leaves the hose. Can be solid, fog, or other specialty nozzle (e.g., piercing, Bresnan cellar nozzle, wand tip, etc.).
NPSH
National Pipe Straight Hose thread, also known as IPT (Iron Pipe Thread, or International Pipe Thread). Like NH threads, NPSH threads are commonly used in fire hose couplings, but the two types are not interchangeable with each other and cannot be connected together without adapters. NPSH threads have a slightly smaller diameter and more threads per inch than NH, but NPSH hoses can be fitted to NPT (National Pipe Tapered) plumbing fixtures, as the diameters and thread pitches are similar.
New York roof hook
A pry tool.

== O ==
Officer's tool
A lock pulling device. Also called an A-tool.
Open-circuit SCBA
See SCBA. Exhaled air is not reused by the system.
Outside stem and yoke valve (OS&Y)
Type of gate valve actuator arranged such that the valve stem moves in and out of the handle, thus externally indicating whether the valve is open or shut, unlike the more common gate valve wherein the stem rotates and only the gate moves up and down inside the fixture.
Oxyacetylene cutting torch
A commonly used torch that burns oxygen and acetylene to produce a very hot flame. Used as a forcible entry cutting tool for penetrating metal enclosures that are resistant to more conventional forcible entry equipment.

== P ==
Panic doors, panic hardware
Fire safety appliance permitting locked doors (typically self-closing) to be opened from the inside when pressed with sufficient force, thus permitting a person to open the door without having to turn a knob or lever.
PASS device, personal alert safety system
An alarm device that signals that a firefighter is in trouble. It can be activated manually by the firefighter, or activates automatically if the firefighter stops moving. May be integral to SCBA or separately activated. Also known as an ADSU (automatic distress signal unit).
Passport (accountability)
System in which each firefighter has an identification document that is collected by the person in charge of accounting for the respective individuals in a dangerous area, and returned to the firefighter when he or she leaves the dangerous area.
Pike pole
See hook
Penetrator nozzle
A long narrow nozzle with a hardened steel tip designed to be forced through a wall or other obstruction to deliver water to a fire on the other side when other modes of access aren't possible or carry an unacceptable degree of risk. Also commonly used in aircraft fires to rapidly deliver water or foam to the interior of an aircraft.
Pickheaded axe
Standard fire axe having a 6 or 8 lb (2.7 or 3.6 kg) steel head with a cutting blade on one edge and a square, pointed pick on the opposite side. Come in various handle lengths.
Plec-Tron
Jargon, brand-name of early radio-frequency paging system for summoning firefighters.
The Pig
A blunt forcible entry tool.
Pineapple
Tool used to help suppress a basement fire.
Pipeman
The firefighter who is on the nozzle attacking the fire.
Plug
Slang term for a fire hydrant. This survives from the days when water mains actually had holes in the tops that were plugged. Many firefighters want to keep this word while many others think it should be replaced with the accurate term, "hydrant".
Pompier ladder
A style of ladder that is also known as a "scaling ladder". It is used to climb from one window to another. It differs from other ladders in that it does not rest on the ground. Instead it uses a large hook at the top to attach to a window sill. The word "pompier" is French for "firefighter".
Pony section
A shorter length of fire hose, especially large diameter hose, used to connect an apparatus to a hydrant or another apparatus.
Portable water tank
Collapsible reservoir used for storing water transported to fireground by tanker. May be inflatable or supported by a frame.
Positive pressure ventilation (PPV)
Ventilation of an area by the use of a fan to push clean air into that space and controlled use of openings for the escape of smoke and gasses.
Post indicator valve (PIV)
A type of valve used for underground piping, having a lockable actuator atop a post with a window indicating "open" or "shut" status of the valve. It can be used to control a sprinkler system, hydrant or other device, or may be used as a divisional valve. Post indicator valves are also used for process and domestic water systems, and when this occurs on the same property, they are distinguished by color: red for fire; blue, green or yellow for process water.
Preconnect
Firehose on a fire engine that has one end connected to a pump outlet, and usually a nozzle on the other end. May also be a preconnected inlet hose (e.g., soft suction). Reduces steps at scene of fire.
Pulaski
A tool that combines an axe and a mattock in one head, similar to that of the cutter mattock, with a rigid handle of wood, plastic, or fiberglass
Pumper
Vehicle apparatus for pumping water and other fire suppressants. See fire engine.

== Q ==
Quint
Fire apparatus equipped with a fire pump, water tank, ground ladders, and hose bed in addition to the aerial device.

== R ==
R-Tool
A forcible entry tool for removing cylinder locks; used with a Halligan bar. It is a larger version of a K-tool.
Rabbit tool
Hydraulic spreading tool that is specially designed to open doors that swing inward.
Red line
See booster hose
Reducer
Adapter used to attach a larger diameter source hose to a smaller diameter receiving hose. The female end has the larger threads, while the male end has the smaller threads.
Relief valve
A valve set to open at a specified pressure so as to not exceed safe operating pressure in hoses or pumps.
Rescue engine
A single piece of fire apparatus that can operate as either a rescue or an engine. This apparatus normally is outfitted with heavy rescue equipment, hoselines, pump, water tank, etc.
Rex Tool
A twenty-four inch bar with a U-shaped head, designed for grabbing and pulling lock cylinders. The other end is a chisel tip.
Rig
See apparatus.
Ringdown (telephone)
An automatic ringdown circuit consists of two phones at different locations. When either phone goes off-hook, the one at the other end instantly rings.
Ringdown (radio)
A radio, incorporating a selective calling capability, has an attention-getting device triggered by a dispatching center. A triggered device emits a sound alerting staff at a fire station, in an ambulance, on a vehicular radio or at a vehicular data terminal that an emergency call is pending. The act of ringing down a station may ring bells, activate a klaxon, turn off gas-fired cooking appliances, activate a volunteer alerting siren, turn on lights, and activate loudspeakers over which the call details are announced. Some systems use the voice path of a private line telephone circuit or a voice channel on a microwave radio instead of a two-way radio. Ringing down a vehicle may cause the radio or data terminal itself to beep continually until an "acknowledge" button is pressed.
Rope hose tool
Short strap or rope with a hooks at both ends for wrapping around a charged hose to secure it in position or to assist in moving it.
Roof ladder
Straight ladder with folding hooks at the top end. The hooks anchor the ladder over the roof ridge.

== S ==
Salvage cover
Tarps used to protect property (contents) during overhaul.
SCBA
Self-contained breathing apparatus, or air-pack, worn by firefighters to protect against toxic fumes and smoke, or where the air has insufficient oxygen. Often incorrectly called "oxygen mask" by laypersons. These are typically open circuit style, with a supply of compressed air, where expired air is exhausted, rather than closed circuit where it is filtered, re oxygenated from compressed oxygen, and inhaled again—which is used where an air supply is needed for an extended period (up to four hours).
Seatbelt cutter
A tool consisting of a razor blade recessed in plastic. Used to cut seat belts or other restrictions during an emergency.
Self-contained breathing apparatus
see SCBA
Shove knife
A semi-ridged metallic indented blade used to open an outwardly-swinging latch and spring type door.
Siamese
hose coupling for merging two streams into one, i.e., two female coupling inlets and one male coupling outlet.
Skid unit
A Skid unit or Slip-on is the common name used to refer to a self-contained fire fighting rig that includes hose, water tank, pump, and an engine to drive the pump, all mounted on a skid, designed to be slid into or onto the open or flat bed of a suitable truck.
Slip-on
See skid unit.
Small-diameter hose
Generally accepted to be fire hose 3" or less in diameter.
Smoke detector
1. part of a fire alarm system that detects and signals presence of smoke
2. self-contained household device for same purpose as (1) but with its own noisemaking device.
Smoke ejector
Powerful fan for moving large amounts of air and smoke as part of ventilation task while fighting fire in a burning structure. May be operated by electricity or gas motor for positive or negative pressure ventilation.
Soda-acid extinguisher
Weak water/acid solution inside a pressure vessel, which activates bicarbonate of soda when triggered, expelling "water" (mixture) under pressure from the resulting carbon dioxide. These are obsolete and usually replaced with an APW or multipurpose extinguisher.
Soft suction hose, soft sleeve
A short piece of fire hose, usually 10 to 20 feet (6.1 m) long, of large diameter, greater than 2.5 inches (64 mm) and as large as 6 inches (150 mm), used to move water from a fire hydrant to the fire engine, when the fire apparatus is parked close to the hydrant.
Solid stream
A fire-fighting water stream emitted from a smooth-bore nozzle. This fire-fighting stream has the greatest reach and largest drops of water.
Spanner wrench
Small tool primarily used to tighten or loosen hose couplings; can also be used as a prying tool or a gas key.
Special egress control device
Locking device on doors used for delaying opening for short period (10–15 seconds) after release is pressed. Permitted as panic hardware in limited circumstances. May also refer to a security system that releases electronic door locks when a fire alarm is activated, such as in stairwells of a high-rise building.
Spray nozzle
See fog nozzle.
Sprinkler system
fire suppression system in a building, typically activated by individual heat-sensitive valves, or remotely controlled by other types of sensors, releasing water onto the fire. May be "wet" (water-filled) or "dry" (air-pressurized).
Standpipe
1. (US) A system of pipes inside a building for conducting water for fire hose attachments; may be pressurized with water ("wet") or remain "dry" until activated in an emergency; supplied either from a fire hydrant attachment or from a fire engine's pump. Permits firefighters to reach higher levels of tall buildings without having to run hoses up the stairs. Known as "wet riser" and "dry riser" respectively in the United Kingdom.
2. (UK) A J- or T-shaped metal pipe used to access underground fire hydrants.
Station wear
The standard uniform worn by firefighters when they are around the station. It usually consists of Nomex uniform pants, a Nomex uniform shirt, and a pair of steel-toed uniform boots. The color of the uniform may differ from department to department. These are often worn under firefighting bunker gear, also referred to as PPEs (personal protective equipment), as an extra layer of protection against fires.
Steamer connection
A Siamese inlet to a standpipe or sprinkler system. Named for early application of steam engines for pumps.
Steamer outlet
Large outlet of fire hydrant.
Storz coupling
A type of coupling used on fire hose. The coupling is sexless, and secures with a 1/4 turn of the coupling. The coupling may or may not have some sort of locking device.
Straight stream
A fire-fighting water stream generated by a combination nozzle, characterized by a long reach and large water drops. It is essentially the narrowest of fog patterns that can be produced.
Strainer
1. A large metal device attached to the end of a suction hose that prevents debris from entering the hose or the pump when drawing water from a pond or other body of water.
2. A stationary accumulation of debris in a moving body of water.
Stream straightener
A smoothbore pipe with baffles inside of the pipe. Usually a stream straightener is used on a master stream device between the outlet housing of the device and a smooth bore tip to reduce the agitation of water traveling to the tip so as to produce a better stream.
Suction hose
A large, semi-flexible and non collapsible hose used to move water from a static source such as a pond, pool or storage tank to a fire pump by means of suction. The whole process is often known as "drafting". Should not be used to connect pressurized hydrants to pumps.
Sunila tool
A "through-the-lock" tool that is essentially a modified pinch bar, designed to pull lock cylinders out of doors, and thus allow entry for firefighters.
Supply line, supply hose, large-diameter hose
fire hose, usually larger than 2.5 inches (64 mm) in diameter, used to transport water from one source to another, such as from a hydrant to a fire engine or from one engine to another. In the US a 5" diameter hose is common. Short pieces of this hose used to attach to a hydrant are often called "soft suction" (see above).

== T ==
Tag accountability
System in which each firefighter is issued two identification tags, one of which is then collected by a safety officer and held while the firefighter is in a hazardous area. To reclaim the tag, the firefighter must present the matching tag upon exit from the hazard. Any unclaimed tags after an "event" (such as a collapse or explosion) means the corresponding firefighters are missing. May be implemented as passport system in which first tag is presented to staging officer upon arrival (for tracking) and second tag is held by IDLH safety officer, as above.
Water tender or Water tanker
A heavy truck or aircraft fitted with a large tank for water or other firefighting agent; as used in wildland firefighting or rural areas lacking hydrants.
Task Force Tips (TFT)
a popular brand of adjustable fog stream combination nozzle, now a ubiquitous term for that type of nozzle.
Thermal imaging camera (TIC)
Ruggedized infrared equipment used by some firefighters to detect hidden people, animals, heat sources (i.e., fire) and structural compromise.
Tones
A series of two or three musical notes, used as an auditory alert over a radio or radio-paging system to indicate that a particular fire company, district, or territory is dispatched to service on a particular incident.
Tower ladder
See aerial ladder.
Trash line
A preconnected attack line that is typically 1¾" diameter, and stored either on the front bumper of the apparatus or in an exterior (exposed) side well. Trash lines are typically shorter length than cross-lays, and are intended for use against dumpster fires, etc., where a longer length of hose (and consequent rebedding after the suppression is complete) is not desired.
Triple combination engine company
apparatus carries water, pumps water, carries hose and other equipment; firefighters who may carry out direct attack or support other engine companies.
Triple lay ("triple fold", "triple load")
A method of loading preconnected attack line into a hose bed or crosslay, often facilitating rapid hose deployment in a pre-flaked configuration.
Turnout gear
The protective clothing worn by firefighters, made of a fire-resistant material such as Nomex or Aramid, and designed to shield against extreme heat. Sometimes called bunker gear. See PPE. Includes helmet, jacket and boots, and some departments include fire-resistant pants.
Turntable
rotating base of an aerial ladder that permits the ladder to be elevated and extended in any direction from a fixed location.

== U ==
Utility rope
A rope designed for non-life safety applications. This includes hauling equipment or securing ladders, as opposed to belaying.
Uni-Engine
The Uni-Engine ("Klump pump") is a self-contained mobile firefighting apparatus, consisting of a water tank, high-pressure pump and storage area for fast transportation to remote areas

== V ==
Valve
Mechanical means for stopping and starting flow in a conduit; many types used in firefighting, including gate–, foot–, clapper– (backflow preventers), sprinkler-heads, etc.
Variable speed fire pump controller
A Variable Speed (VFD) Fire Pump Controller is a fire pump controller that is able to vary the speed of the motor depending on the demand of the fire pump, resulting in the ability to hold a constant discharge pressure.
Ventilation saw
A high-powered saw with metal-cutting teeth or disc for quickly making large openings in roofing materials. Often, a chain saw with an attached guard to limit the depth of cut.

== W ==
Wagon
See hose wagon.
Wall-indicator valve
Type of control valve for sprinkler systems that is mounted to an outside wall and indicates "open" or "shut" in an indicator window on the valve body.
Water can
See APW fire extinguisher.
Water curtain nozzle
A nozzle designed to throw a fan of water droplets to form a "curtain" in an attempt to reduce the risk of radiated heat igniting a nearby exposure. Also known as Water Wall.
Water flow alarm
An audible alarm indicating that one or more sprinkler heads have been activated. "Flow" is often detected by a change in pressure, subjecting these systems to false alarms if anything affects the water pressure feeding the system, however transient.
Water mist fire suppression
A sprinkler-like system that uses a very fine mist featuring much lower water flow than conventional sprinklers to suppress, rather than extinguish a fire.
Water tender or tanker
A vehicle that contains a substantial tank of water and perhaps a pump, primarily for drafting or bulk transfer to a portable water tank.
Webbing
A strong fabric woven into a strip. Used to drag victims, as a hose strap, or to secure objects.
Water thief (valve)
Type of gated wye having one or more outlets smaller than the largest outlet.
Wedges
Wooden blocks for temporary shut-off of activated sprinkler heads or holding doors open during firefighting or rescue operations.
Wet pipe sprinkler system
Sprinkler system containing pressurized water rather than air, such that water flows immediately upon release of a heat-sensitive head.
"Wet water"
Water into which a surface tension reducing agent has been introduced. The resultant mixture, with its reduced surface tension, is more able to penetrate burning product more deeply and extinguish deep-seated fire.
Wye
hose appliance used for splitting one line into two discharges. Often a gated wye is used to allow and disallow water flow through the two separate discharges. Not to be confused with Siamese, which is used to bring two smaller lines together into one.

== Y ==
Y-connect
See wye.

== Z ==
Z-adapter
Large hose appliance for connecting supplemental pumps into long supply lines, in the form of a "Z"; may be improvised from two gated wye valves and a double female between two of the gated outlets or from a siamese that has one inlet connected to one outlet of a gated wye.

== See also ==
- Glossary of firefighting terms
- List of basic firefighting topics
- Women in firefighting
