= Fire prevention =

Methods and actions taken to prevent a fire

Fire prevention is a set of proactive methods/practices to prevent fire-based emergencies and minimize the damage caused to the surrounding environment by them. There are two priority focuses of fire prevention: eliminating the factors that cause them, or controlling the conditions at which a fire can be born. These methods aim to significantly reduce the frequency or extremity of a fire. The prevention of fires relies heavily on Fire education as knowledge is a fundamental component to executing fire preventing/ controlling measures safely and effectively. Key aspects of fire prevention: Education/practices, Engineering, Enforcement, and Emergency Response.

== Safe practices ==
=== Smoke detector installation ===
The National Fire Protection Association reports 3 out of 5 deaths that occur during fires happen in homes that do not have smoke detectors installed or homes that do not have working smoke detectors. The chances of dying in a fire are reduced by 50 percent when smoke detectors are present. Approximately 74 percent of homes do have working smoke detectors installed.

Generally taught more to adults (particularly homeowners), a core part of fire prevention outreach involves encouraging people to ensure that they have an adequate number of smoke detectors installed in their home and how to maintain them.

- Smoke detectors are to be tested regularly to make certain that they are in good working order. These steps can significantly reduce deaths in household fires, particularly at night when people are sleeping.
- Smoke detectors generally make a persistent beeping sound when their batteries run low, and a key part of fire prevention outreach involves encouraging people to replace batteries promptly instead of just removing them to make the beeping stop.

=== Sprinkler systems ===
Sprinkler systems are used as a quick water delivery system to prevent a fire from growing beyond the capacity of the fire suppression systems allowing for safe egress. Most sprinkler systems are activated by the breaking of a glass bulb or fusible link by radiant heat of a fire which allows water to flow freely through the open parts of the system. The most common types of sprinkler systems consists of wet-pipe, dry-pipe, & deluge.

A wet-pipe sprinkler system is an automatic sprinkler system in which the supply valves are open and the system is charged with water. They are the quickest at getting water on the fire and are the simplest to maintain. Wet-pipe systems are installed where indoor temperatures can be maintained at or above 40 degrees Fahrenheit (4 °C). If the outside temperature is below freezing and the interior temperature is less than 40 degrees Fahrenheit, the steel sprinkler piping, which rapidly conducts heat and rapidly loses it, will cause the pipes to freeze. The frozen area may be isolated and near an opening or uninsulated portion of the building which could be enough to put the whole system out of service.

A dry-pipe sprinkler system uses a dry-pipe valve that holds water in a certain area leaving the sprinkler pipes empty. These are used in areas where freezing temperatures are common to reduce the risk of damage by water freezing in the pipes. These are activated by a glass bulb or fusible link which when exposed to radiant heat bursts allowing for the air pressure in the sprinkler pipe to drop opening the dry-pipe valve.

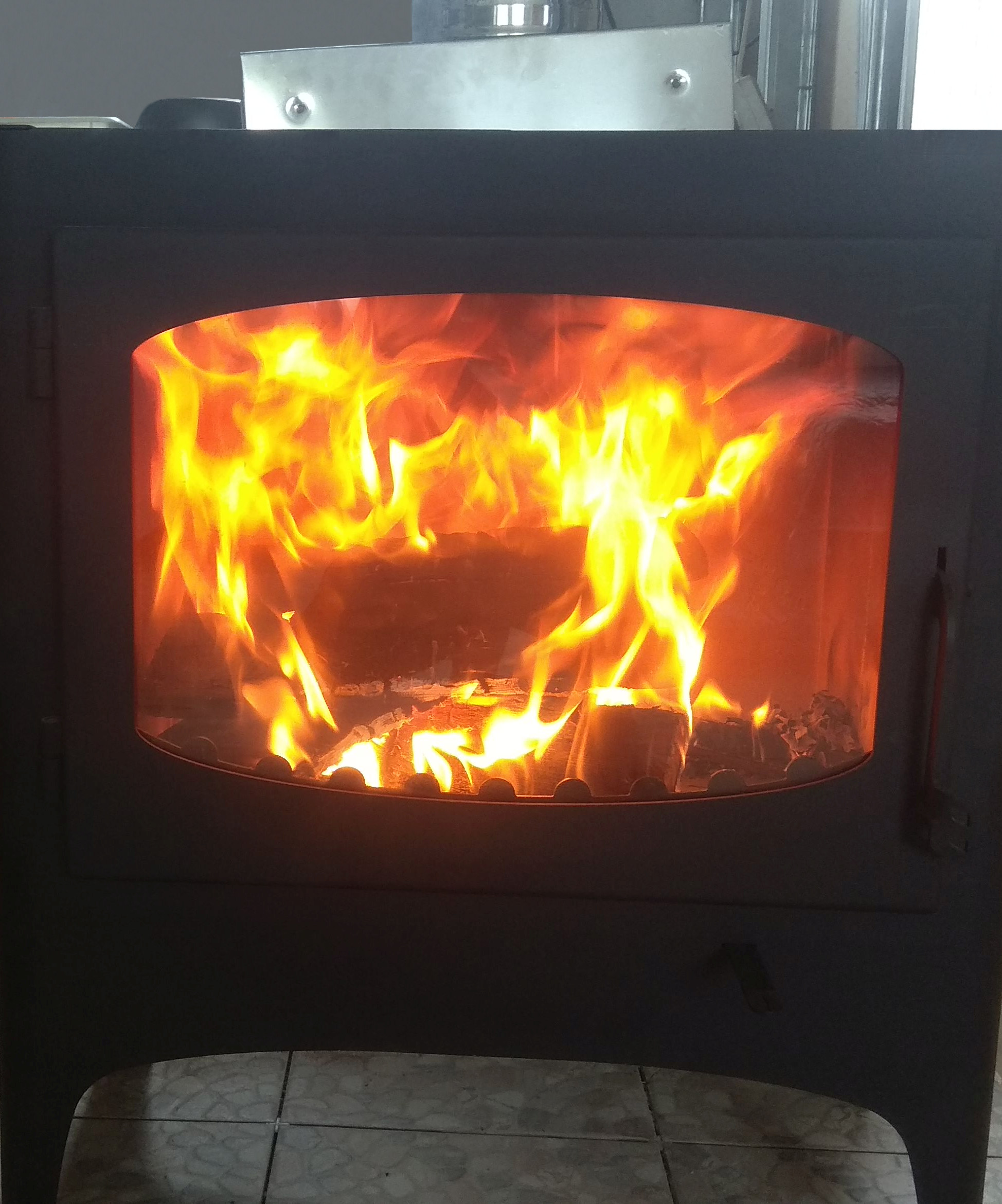
Stoves have sometimes caused accidental fires.

=== Reduction of false alarms ===
Much of fire prevention education also involves advice on how to reduce false alarms. False alarms have the potential to waste manpower and resources, which may be needed desperately during a real emergency. In addition, firefighters responding to calls in fire engines are at increased risk of traffic collisions when driving under emergency conditions. In 2008 the state of New York found that 18% of firefighter deaths in the line of duty had occurred whilst responding to calls.

=== Stop, drop and roll ===
Stop, drop and roll is the most taught part of fire protection education efforts as it is both a simple technique and an effective way of extinguishing burning clothing. It is particularly suited to children who may panic if their clothing catches fire and they do not know how to put it out.

== Target audiences and those at risk ==
These groups of people are those that are considered at higher risk for fires and should are the target of fire prevention education in a way to better protect them from fire emergencies. These are also target audience such as students that can benefit from the knowledge of how to prevent fires from starting in their homes.

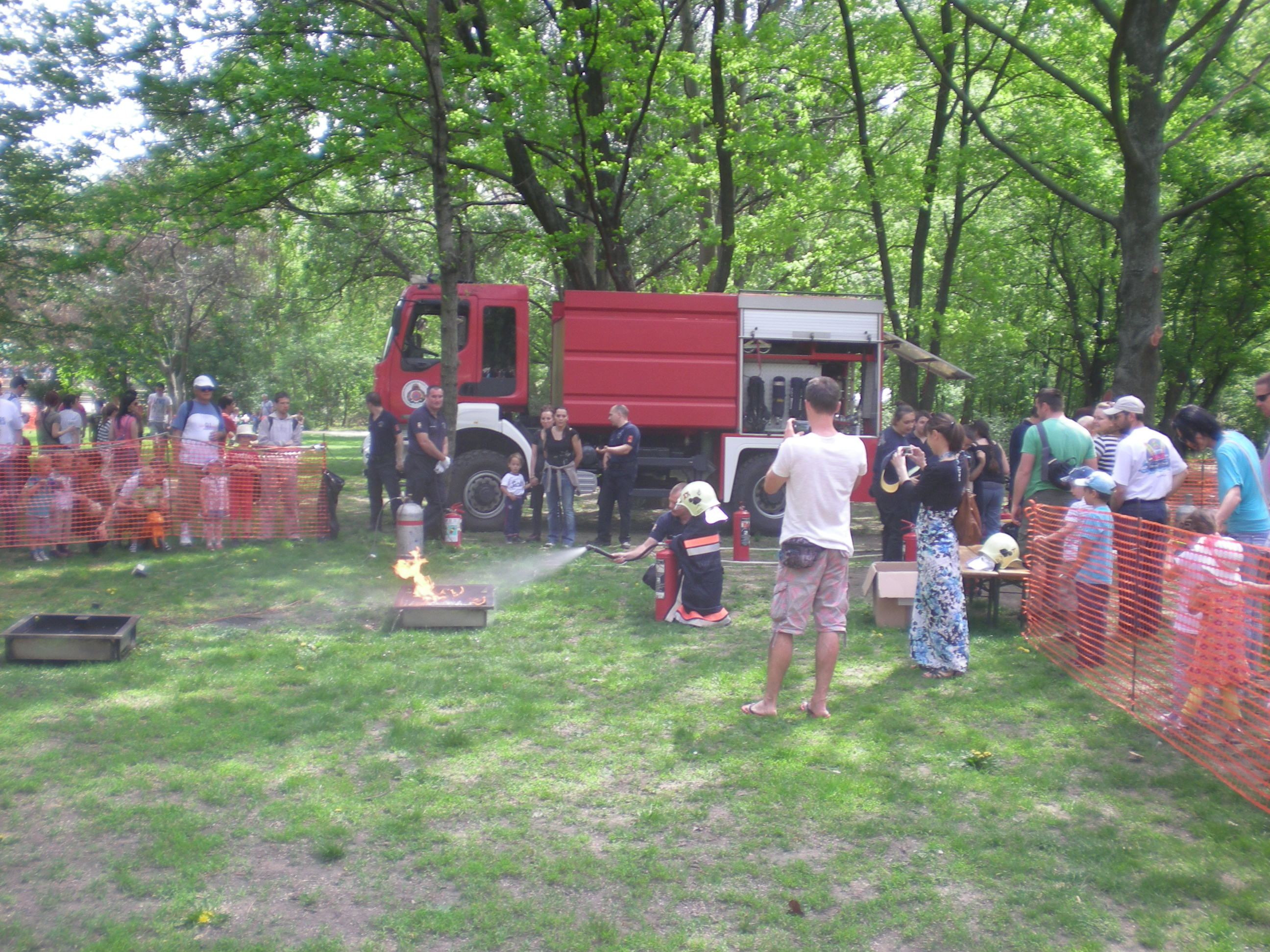
Firefighters teaching a class of young students about how to properly use a fire extinguisher

=== Children ===
Children are considered a risk factor due the stage in cognitive development that they are at. To help educate the at risk populations firefighters will perform events at schools focusing on fire & life safety education, teaching students the basics of fire protection and fire safety, including topics on how to evacuate from a burning building with some departments using EDITH drills and how to prevent fires by avoiding hazards such as playing with matches, or leaving cooking to their parental figures.

Fire safety education for young children can include familiarisation with firefighters and their personal protective equipment (PPE). The appearance and sounds of firefighters wearing bunker gear and using a self-contained breathing apparatus (SCBA) may frighten some children. Educational activities introduce children to this equipment to help them recognise firefighters during an emergency.

=== Elderly and disabled people ===
Elderly and disabled people are at greater risk in emergency situations as a result of poor mobility or mental decline from age. Fire prevention outreach often involves ensuring that these groups have a clearly defined plan of what to do in the event of an emergency and easy access to emergency exits.

Elderly people are considered by the United States Fire Administration those to be the ages of 65 and older and those that have mental and physical impairments and may rely heavily on medical supplements to get through their everyday lives. These medical aids can cause certain hazards to responders such as oxygen tanks and tubing adding possible fire and entanglement hazards.

=== Landlords and caretakers ===
In many jurisdictions, landlords are responsible for implementing fire prevention and fire safety measures in accordance with various laws. Landlords must perform regular fire safety risk assessments in order to identify if any properties could be potentially harmed by fires.

=== Hoarders ===
Hoarding is the disorder in which a person or group of people have a difficulty throwing away things they no longer need or parting away with any kind of possession because they believe that they will need to save them for something. Hoarding can range from mild cases that may not have a very heavy impact on a person’s life to severe cases where the daily function of the person is hindered by their actions

Hoarding becomes a great fire hazard in severe cases because of the number of items that may pile up. Often the homes of hoarders will block exits that provide a means of escape for the occupants. Firefighters that are responding to an emergency in the home of hoarders may not be able to get to the occupants as quickly because they are obstructed from entering the building. Because of the increased fire load a hoarding environment creates, those who live in occupancies in close proximity may be affected because of amplified smoke and fire conditions.

=== Smokers ===
According to the world health organization consensus there are around 1.3 billion smokers worldwide, 80 percent of those smokers are identified as those that live in low income area and middle income areas.

While smoking is a commonly accepted thing that many people do in their daily lives out in public or in their own home it is important for those that smoke to know the fire risk they present. Approximately 500 smokers as well as nonsmokers are killed in fires that start because of improperly discarded cigarettes and ashes. Fires caused by smoking are the most preventable of all. Most fires that involve smoking start inside the home, when a smoker does not properly dispose of their ashes or cigarette butts, they can fall into things such as couches and chairs which quickly ignite. Smokers who discard their cigarettes and ashes in the trash can start fires that lead to other collateral damage.

== Fire prevention inspections and community outreach programs ==
Many fire departments have fire prevention divisions, which consist of groups of fire marshals who conduct building inspections to make sure they are compliant with fire codes; they also visit schools and daycare centers to make presentations about arson, malicious false alarms, and fire safety. Fire Prevention Officers may also conduct tours of their fire house for visitors. They demonstrate what each of their apparatuses does, and sometimes will don their bunker gear to show what a firefighter wears into a fire. Fire prevention education can take the form of videos, pamphlets, and banners and is often provided by local fire departments. Many fire departments will have one or more Fire Prevention Officers, which may also be a routine duty of firefighters.

A typical fire prevention division consists of a Chief Fire Prevention Officer and Fire Prevention Officers. Those in the Fire Prevention Division have their own insignia, such as epaulets with two thin bars that read "FIRE PREVENTION OFFICER" below them; crescents on their helmets; and collar pins. Depending on its budget, a division may have its own fire vehicle.

== Observance and history of Fire Protection Month in the United States ==
Fire Prevention Week usually during the first week of October is often used as a time for fire departments to go out and educate their communities about home fire safety risks. One tool often used to relate to younger kids is the use of the NFPA Sparky mascot, used to be more receptive by children and introduce them to fire safety in a kid friendly way.

Fire Prevention Week started in 1922 by the Nation Fire Protection Association. The observance of Fire Prevention Week is considered the longest running public health celebration in the United States. This observance was started in honor of the Great Chicago Fire that occurred on October 8, 1871. This is why Fire Prevention Week occurs every October and specifically on the week that October 9 falls.

== Fire prevention - global outlook ==
Fire preventing strategies and practices vary depending on regional climate and surrounding infrastructure. There are an abundance of methods to handling and preparing for fire risks and eventual hazards, because of this there is always more than one type/form of response to fire danger. Universal Techniques include: detection, education & mitigation.

=== Asia (Thailand, Vietnam, Laos) ===
The main aim of the Asia-Pacific region is to reduce fire harm by education of the public, technological advancement, and studying fires and their outbreak causes. Their focuses are community involvement and tactical prevention.

=== Europe ===
The European Union uses EN 13501 a construction material classification system that grades based on fire reactions. With this residential safety and city integrity are the primary areas of focus. Wildfire prevention is also a key aspect to European fire protection programs, with the objective to grow forests back to increase moisture content in soil in air, reducing drought, to prevent wild fire ignitions and spread.

=== Japan ===
In its urban environment and dense population Japan prioritizes passive fire protection with community integrated fire safety education programs. Though the use on controlled burns the city is less damaged. The goal is to protect civilians and buildings integrity as much as possible during fire outbreak. "The "Hi no Youjin" Tradition: Dating back to the Edo period, the phrase "Hi no Youjin" (Beware of Fire) is still chanted during neighborhood patrols. Community members or volunteer fire corps often walk through streets, especially in winter, clapping wooden blocks to remind residents to turn off heaters and stoves"

=== Australia and New Zealand ===
These nations utilize comprehensive climate specific fire prevention strategies. Due to the high temperature and arid environment, the use of fuel management is most effective here. "Fuel management is strategic removal, reduction, or modification of vegetation to reduce wildfire intensity and slow spread, to improve firefighter safety."

== See also ==
- Combustible
- Controlled burn
- Fire control
- Firefighting
- Hypoxic air technology for fire prevention
- National Fire Protection Association
