= Hose strap =

Firefighting equipment

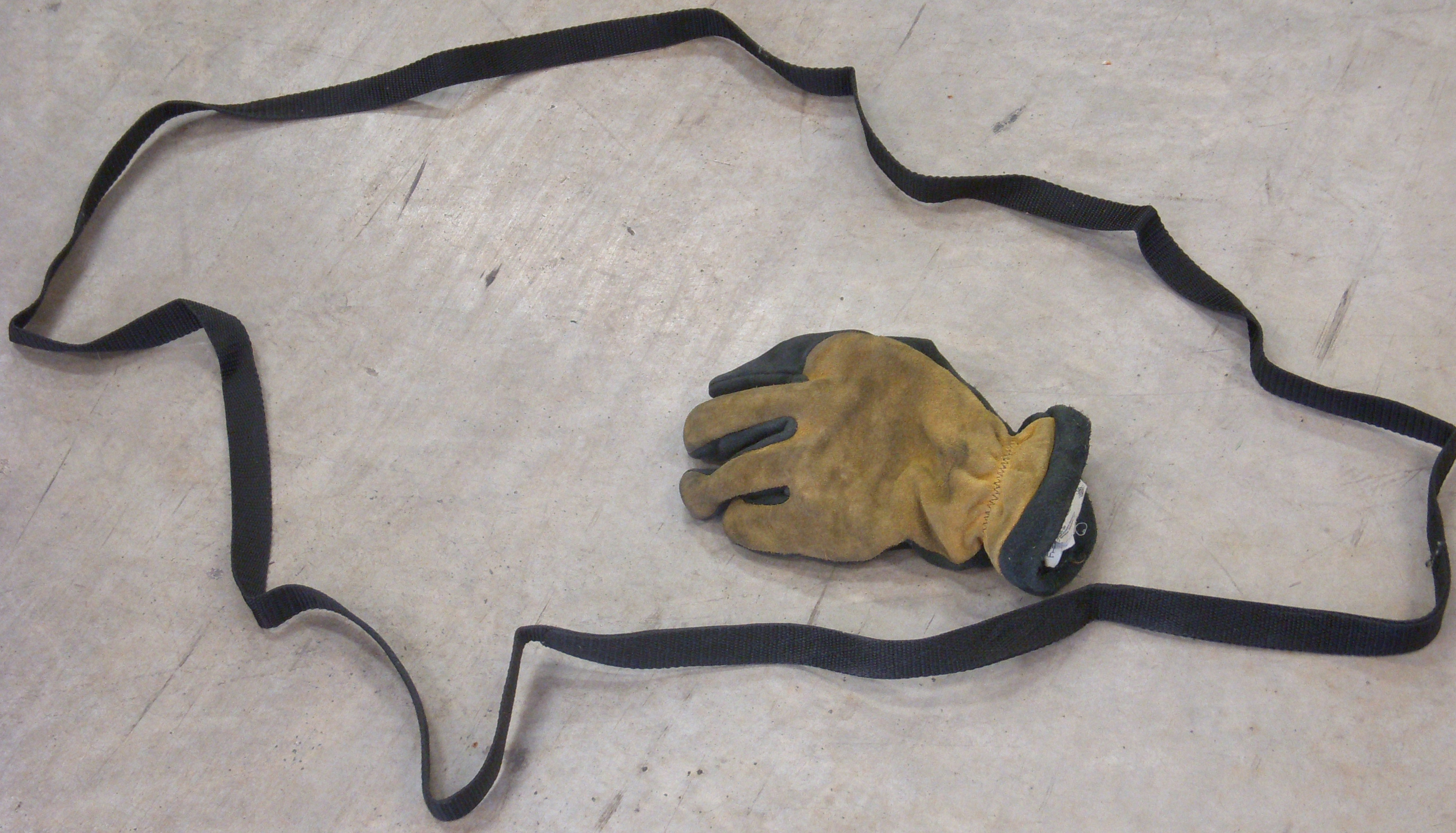
A nylon loop hose strap, with a structural firefighting glove for size comparison

A hose strap (also known as a rope hose tool) is a piece of firefighting equipment. Having a variety of uses, the name derives from the main use of securing a charged hoseline, allowing a firefighter to better control the flow of the water.

== Definition and history ==
It can be "a short length of rope with an eye loop at one end and a metal hook at the other" or a piece of "flat nylon webbing sewn into a four-foot loop". Such a tool is routinely carried by firefighters in their structural turnout gear as a standard piece of personal equipment. While the variety with a metal hook may be more versatile, the nylon loop weighs less, is less expensive, and can be safely carried in a pocket. The hose strap has been a firefighting tool in common use since at least 1918, and appears as early as 1898 in an inventory list of Seattle, Washington municipal firefighting equipment.

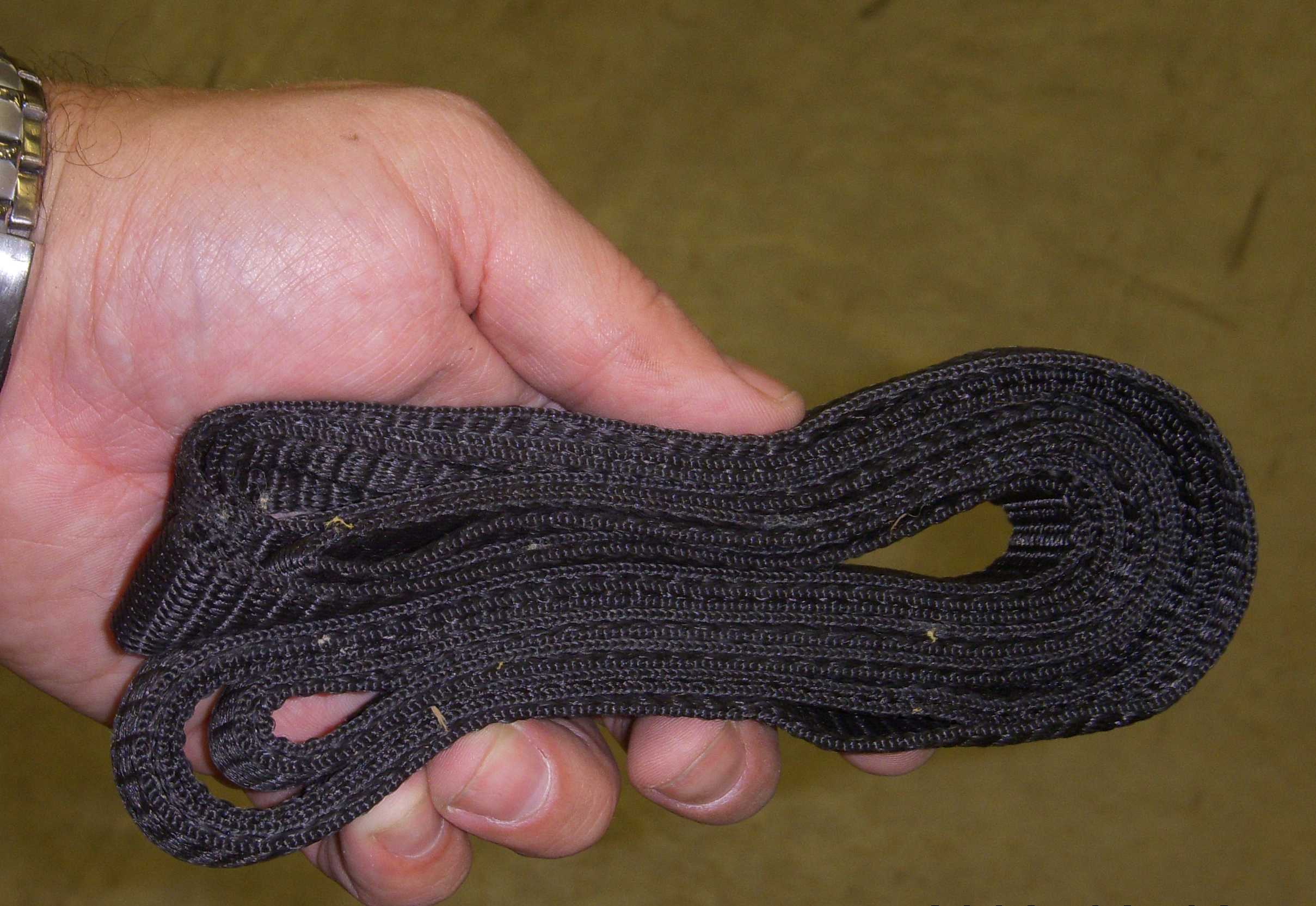
A nylon loop hose strap, folded for storage

== Uses ==
While the terms may be used for a family of similar tools, they share a wide variety of established uses, including carrying un-charged fire hose, opening doors, closing doors, securing hoselines, dragging victims, and even carrying boots.

The use that gives the tool its name, however, is securing a charged hoseline, allowing a firefighter to better control and maneuver the line while flowing water. To use a hose strap in that manner, a firefighter secures the tool to the hoseline three to five feet behind the nozzle, using either the hook or a girth hitch, and loops the other end of the tool around his or her opposite side shoulder.

Since the tool is attached several feet behind the firefighter, its use will not hinder a firefighter wearing a Self-contained breathing apparatus. For larger attack lines, such as a 2 1/2 inches (6.4 cm) hand line, second or third firefighters can use additional hose straps to secure the hose farther behind the nozzle operator, to provide additional leverage against the water pressure. Since multiple hose straps will typically be available to a team of firefighters, they can be used in combination to handle a variety of other tasks. For example, if a task requires greater length than that of a single hose strap, two hose straps may be connected via girth hitch.
