= Higbee =

Higbee may refer to:

- Higbee, Missouri, a city in Randolph County, Missouri, in the United States
- Higbee's, a former Cleveland, Ohio, department store
- USS Higbee (DD-806), a United States Navy destroyer in commission from 1945 to 1979
- Higbee cut, a specific cut added to a screw thread to produce a blunt start

== People with the surname ==
- Chauncey L. Higbee (1821–1884), early member of the Latter Day Saints Movement
- Edward Young Higbee (1810–1871), Episcopal clergyman
- Elias Higbee (1795–1843), American historian and recorder in the Church of Jesus Christ of Latter Day Saints
- Ethan Higbee, American filmmaker
- Francis M. Higbee (1820–1856), early member of the Latter Day Saints Movement
- Lenah Higbee (1874–1941), pioneering nurse in the United States Navy
- Mahlon Higbee (1901–1968), American baseball player
- Shawn Higbee (born 1970), American professional motorcycle racer
- Tyler Higbee (born 1993), American football tight end

== See also ==
- Higbie
- Kirby Higbe
