= Hose bridge =

Type of tram bridge

A hose bridge can be used by tram operators to avoid delays by not being able to cross over fire hoses.

== History, particularly in Chicago ==
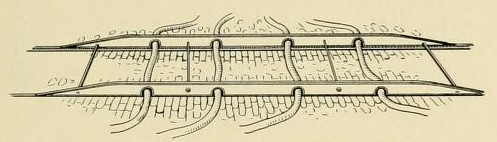
Hose bridge for electric tram lines

When until the end of the 19th century a fire occurred in the down town district of Chicago, near one of the loops of the Chicago Surface Lines, all the lines of the company using that loop were in danger of being tied up for a long period. Crossover switches were placed on the trunk lines before they came to the loops but this provision was inadequate for the large number of cars. The street car tracks were more often blockaded by the loose lines than from the burning building or any other cause.

The hose bridge used by the North Chicago Street Railroad Company for the trolley tracks resembled the bridges which were in service in many other cities. It consisted of a 2 inches (5.1 cm) oak plank on either side bound with 3/16 inch (4.8 mm) strap iron. Four semi-circular holes were cut to accommodate four lines of hose. Tie rods were spaced at intervals to hold the bridge to the proper gauge. The bridge was about 18 feet (5.5 m) over all and the inclines are such as to permit the cars to pass over it easily.

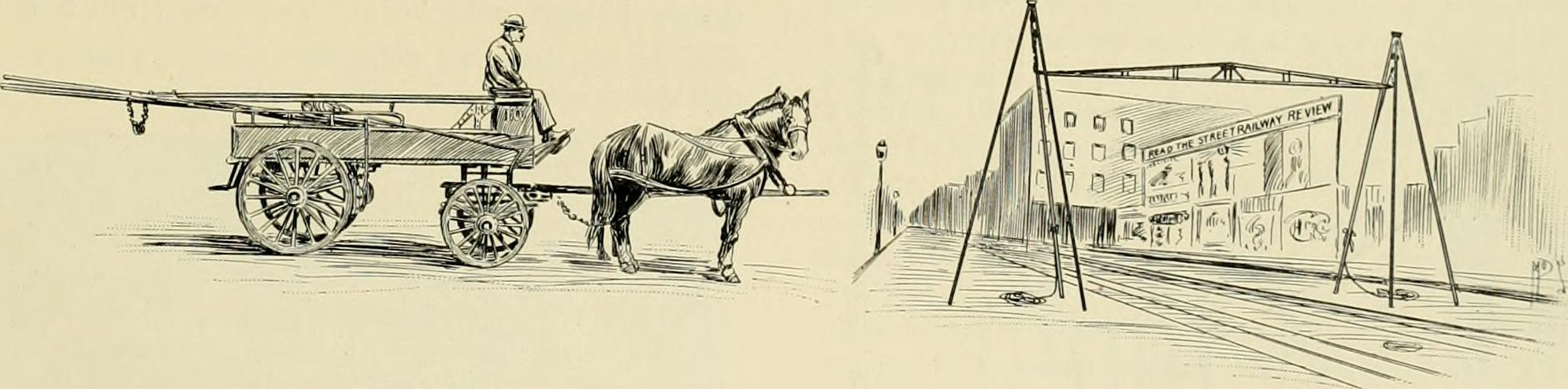
Hose bridge in Chicago

It has been a much more difficult problem to design a suitable bridge for the cable tracks. One, which has been perfected by Superintendent F. L. Fuller in 1898, used two tripods. The legs of the tripods were 21 feet (6.4 m) in length and consisted of tubing, into the interior of which was driven a wooden pole. The bridge proper was divided into two parts each 12 feet (3.7 m). long. The floor was of 7/8 inch (22.2 mm) plank and the rest of the bridge was constructed of light angle iron. The two halves fitted together and were held in place by two long pins.

The bridge ready to be sent to the fire was transported by a horse cart. As soon as it was taken to the scene of operation the two halves were laid across the tracks and pinned together. The lines of hose, any number less than nine, were placed in the bridge and a tripod set on each side of the tracks. A block and tackle was attached to an eye bolt in the apex of each tripod and the bridge with its load of hose was drawn up to the proper height. This whole operation could be performed by three men in less than eight minutes. The particular advantage of this bridge was that the lines of hose when filled with water could be lifted into place, which would have been a very difficult thing to do with almost any other form.

Two of these bridges were kept in a barn at the rear of the general offices. In the office was located a city fire alarm, and as soon as the gong sounds the location of the fire was determined. If the fire was a serious one, the wrecking wagon was sent to the barn and the bridges, which were suspended overhead, were let down into the wagon and quickly dispatched to the proper point. Although designed especially for cable cars the trolley cars passed under it by drawing down the trolley pole. As one fire was liable to blockade nearly all the cars of a system this bridge was estimated to save its cost many times over during one emergency.

== See also ==
- Definition of hose bridge at Glossary of firefighting equipment
