= Higbie =

Higbie is a surname. Notable people with the surname include:

- Barbara Higbie (born 1958), American pianist, composer, violinist, singer-songwriter and multi-instrumentalist
- Carl Higbie (born 1983), American former Navy SEAL and political advisor
- Richard Higbie (1857–1900), American politician

== Other uses ==
- Attorney-General of Canada v. Higbie, a Supreme Court of Canada decision about the role of the Monarchy in the Canadian provinces

== See also ==
- Higbee
