= Siebe Gorman Savox =

Industrial rescue rebreather

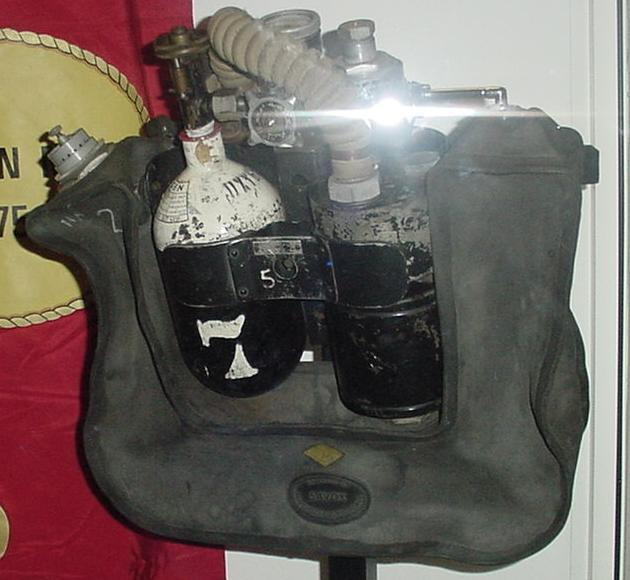
A Savox in a museum

The Siebe Gorman Savox was an industrial and mines rescue oxygen rebreather breathing set with a use duration of 45 minutes. It was worn in front of the body. It had no hard casing.
