= Variable speed fire pump controller =

A Variable Speed (VFD) Fire Pump Controller is a fire pump controller that is able to vary the speed of the motor depending on the demand of the fire pump, resulting in the ability to hold a constant discharge pressure. It differs from other industrial variable speed control devices because it is now considered a life safety device, and so must adhere to the more rigid standards set forth by NFPA-20.

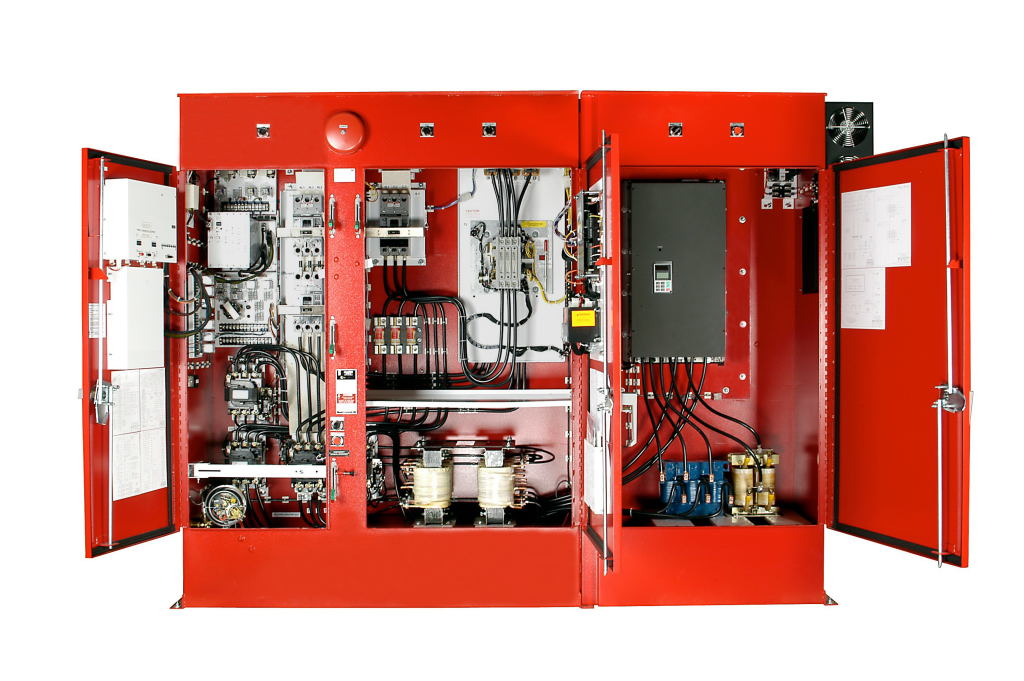

== History ==
Variable Speed Fire Pump Controllers were invented and released with a UL Listing for fire pump service in 2003 by Master Control Systems, Inc. Paragraph 10.5.5 in the 2003 edition of NFPA-20 recognized Variable Speed as an accepted method for operating the fire pump. Then in the NFPA-20 2007 edition, section 10.10 was added to clarify and enhance the previous standards. In addition to reading these standards, a detailed summary of them by James S. Nasby of Columbia Engineering can be found on slides 7–11. In 2008 Master Control Systems, Inc. became the first company to provide FM Approval for the controller. A full list of companies with FM Approval may be found here. Variable Speed Fire Pump Controllers are now accepted by NFPA-20, Underwriters Laboratories (UL), and most recently Factory Mutual (FM) for fire pump applications.

== How variable speed fire pump controllers work ==
Since the output pressure of a centrifugal pump varies with the square of the speed, pressure can be controlled accurately by controlling the speed of the pump. For example: a pump runs at 1785 RPM during shutoff with an output pressure of 204 PSI and a suction pressure of 0 PSI. If the speed of the motor is reduced by 10% to 1607 RPM, the new output pressure becomes 165 PSI. This in turn enables the Variable Speed Controller to maintain a perfectly flat pump discharge curve until the full rating of the pump is reached. Further, the variable speed controller adjusts for varying suction pressure – as in the following example: a city water supply of 65 PSI drops to 26 PSI while flowing. The variable speed drive will speed up to adjust for the sudden drop in pressure and slow down again when it is not needed – all the while maintaining a constant total discharge pressure.

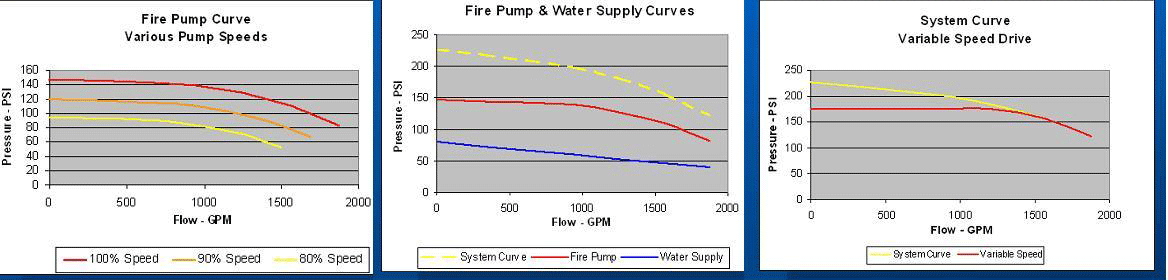

== Advantages ==
- Significantly Reduce Gen-set Sizing – for variable speed controllers, NFPA-20 2010 paragraph 9.4.3 allows the voltage drop to be no lower than 15% while starting, or lower while starting in bypass (depending on the manufacturers capabilities). Given this, a typical application for a 150 hp motor utilizing soft starting, a gen-set manufacturer's sizing program would select a 250 kW gen-set. For the same application, the program would select a 125 kW gen-set when using a variable frequency drive and a primary reactor bypass with a 30% starting voltage drop, cutting the gen-set in half (Slides 36–39).
- Energy Savings – "Most motors turn at nearly constant speed. However, much of the time the devices they drive operate at less than maximum design speed. This reduction can be accommodated by an Adjustable Speed Drive (ASD) that varies the shaft speed to the driven load. Slowing a pump or motor in this manner reduces the energy consumption much more effectively than allowing the motor to run at constant speed and then restricting or bypassing the flow with a valve or damper...if shaft speed is reduced 10%, flow is reduced by 10%, while power consumption is reduced 27%." However, due to the limited operating hours of a fire fighting pump, the total energy savings will be minimal for this type of application, compared to the initial investment.
- Smooth Starting – "ASDs provide soft starting, whereby a motor starts slowly then speeds up. This reduces the mechanical stress on both the motor and the equipment driven by the motor." Variable Speed also provides an initial inrush current of 125–150%, making it the softest available starting method.
- Alternative to PRVs – A variable speed fire pump controller can serve as a viable alternative to PRVs in a high rise building, as well as potentially saving the owner over $250,000 in lieu of PRVs and associated testing by NFPA-25 over the life of the building (slide 28).
- Conserve Water During Testing – NFPA-25 requires that the fire pump controller is operated for 10 minutes each week. This ends up using a substantial amount of water in buildings that have static pressures greater than 175 PSI and relies on a system relief valve to control the pressure: (50–100% of the rating of the pump) × (10minutes) × (52 weeks / year) = water wasted. In contrast, under the same conditions variable speed will waste no water.

== Practical applications ==
Variable speed technology is most often used to solve the following pressure issue situations:

- In high rise buildings used to solve overpressure problems, replace PRVs, reduce the number of zones within the building, and even eliminate storage tanks.
- With poor water supplies helps reconcile large pressure differentials between static and churn situations.
- Provides an alternative to pressure reducing valves by accurately controlling the pressure, as well as eliminating the need for drain risers and regular testing.
- In large loop systems: enables higher water pressure to be provided to the farthest points in the system or the ability to use smaller piping.
- With dual water supplies addresses pressure problems that arise from switching water sources that are significantly different from each other by, for example, running the motor as low as 1/2 speed for one source, and full speed for the other. This gives a 4 to 1 range of operating pump pressures.
- For addressing water hammer see 'Smooth Starting' above.
- In dual use systems utilizes the energy efficiency of the variable frequency drive to lower overall energy usage when using the fire pump as the domestic pump as well.
