= Uni-Engine =

Self-contained mobile firefighting apparatus

The Uni-Engine ("Klump pump") is a self-contained mobile firefighting apparatus. It consists of a water tank, high-pressure pump and storage area. It is transportable to remote wildland fire locations by truck or helicopter.

Klump pumps were used by hotshot crews to limit the extent of controlled burns used to combat the Station fire in 2009 during the defense of Mt Wilson, California.
