= PASS device =

Device used to set off an alarm when a firefighter is in distress

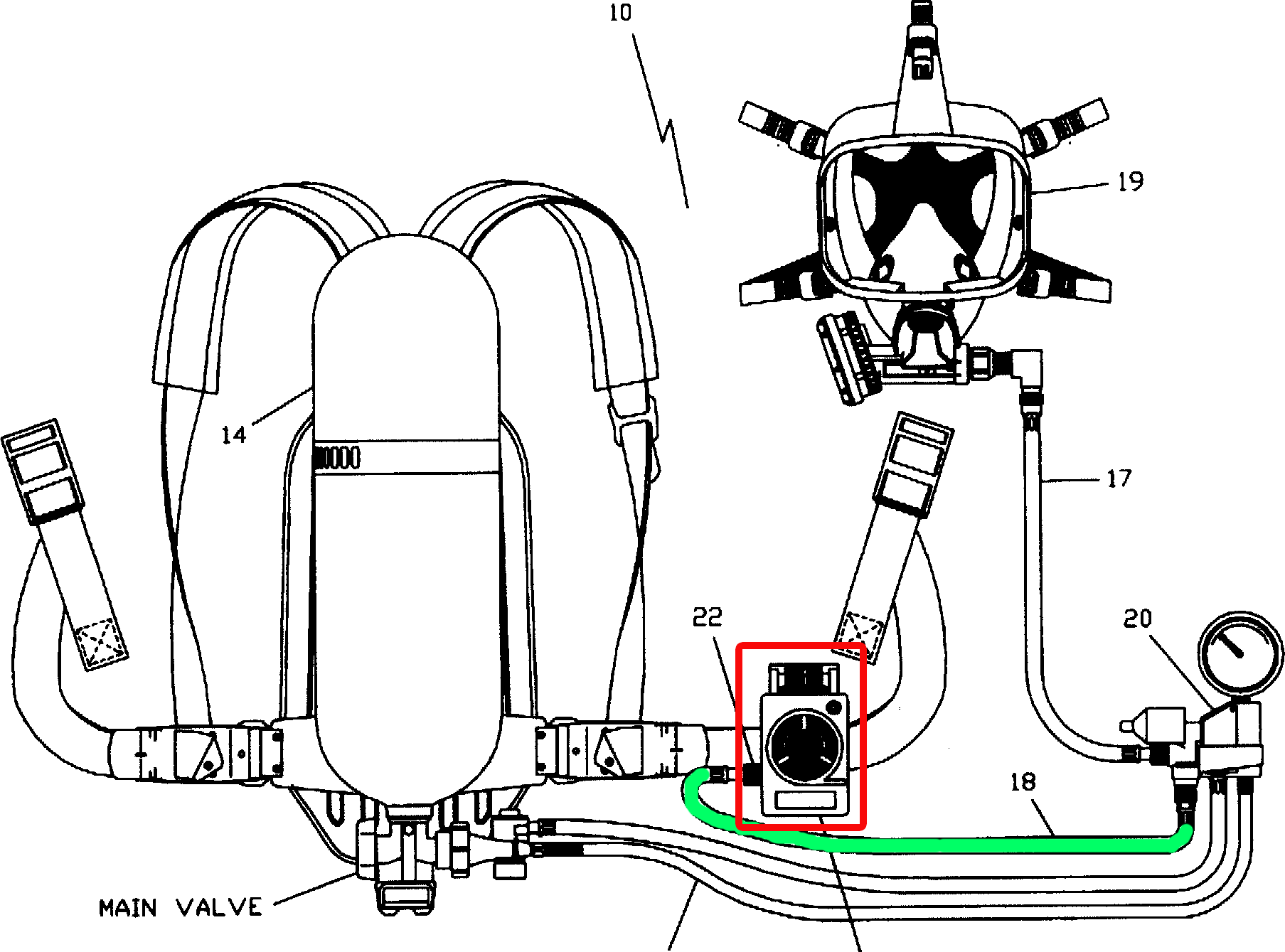
PASS device (22, boxed in red) integrated into an SCBA unit. It is connected by a hose (18, green) to the air circuit and arms automatically when the air circuit is opened.

A personal alert safety system (PASS) device, also known as a distress signal unit (DSU), or automatic distress signal unit (ADSU), is a personal safety device used primarily by firefighters entering a hazardous or "immediately dangerous to life and health" (IDLH) environment such as a burning building. The PASS device sounds a loud (95 decibel) audible alert to notify others in the area that the firefighter is in distress. On a fireground, the sound of an activated PASS device indicates a true emergency and results in an immediate response to rescue the firefighters in distress. In the United States, the National Fire Protection Association sets standards for PASS devices in NFPA 1982.

The PASS device is normally used in conjunction with breathing apparatus; it is a small, battery-powered device attached to the self-contained breathing apparatus (SCBA) harness which enables the firefighter to summon help by activating a loud, piercing electronic bleeper.

Early models were only able to be activated manually, such as when a firefighter is lost or trapped. More recent PASS devices can also automatically activate if the device does not detect motion for 30 seconds, so that the alert will sound if the firefighter is seriously injured or otherwise incapacitated. Some devices use a ball bearing on a track to sense firefighter movement and others use an infrared beam against a mirror mounted on a spring. When activating for a lack of motion, the PASS device will typically emit a few seconds of a muted warning that activation is about to occur, so that a firefighter who has simply been motionless for a time but is otherwise safe will be able to move slightly and thus reset the activation timer before a false activation occurs.

Older models of PASS devices required manual arming by firefighters prior to entering a dangerous environment. The unit was equipped with a key which, when removed, armed the unit. This key was left outside the hazard area with an entry control officer. When the unit activated, it could only be switched off by inserting this key. Current applications integrate the PASS device into the SCBA worn by firefighters so that it automatically arms when the SCBA air supply is engaged or when the SCBA is removed from its mounting bracket. This style devices are powered by battery, are easily activated while wearing gloves, and are intrinsically safe to operate in flammable or explosive atmospheres.

It was reported that shortly after the events of September 11, 2001, the sound of many activated PASS devices could be heard beneath the rubble of the collapsed World Trade Center. 343 firefighters (including a chaplain and two paramedics) of the New York City Fire Department (FDNY) were killed on that day. Typically, at the time these devices were loosely clipped onto the waistbelts of the firefighters, leading to its separation from the firefighters during the collapse. Unfortunately, during recovery efforts many PASS devices were recovered far away from their wearer, defeating their original purpose. This event lead to safety overhauls regarding its design, and direct integration into the SCBA harness.

== See also ==
- Glossary of firefighting equipment
