= Bunker gear =

Personal protective equipment used by firefighters

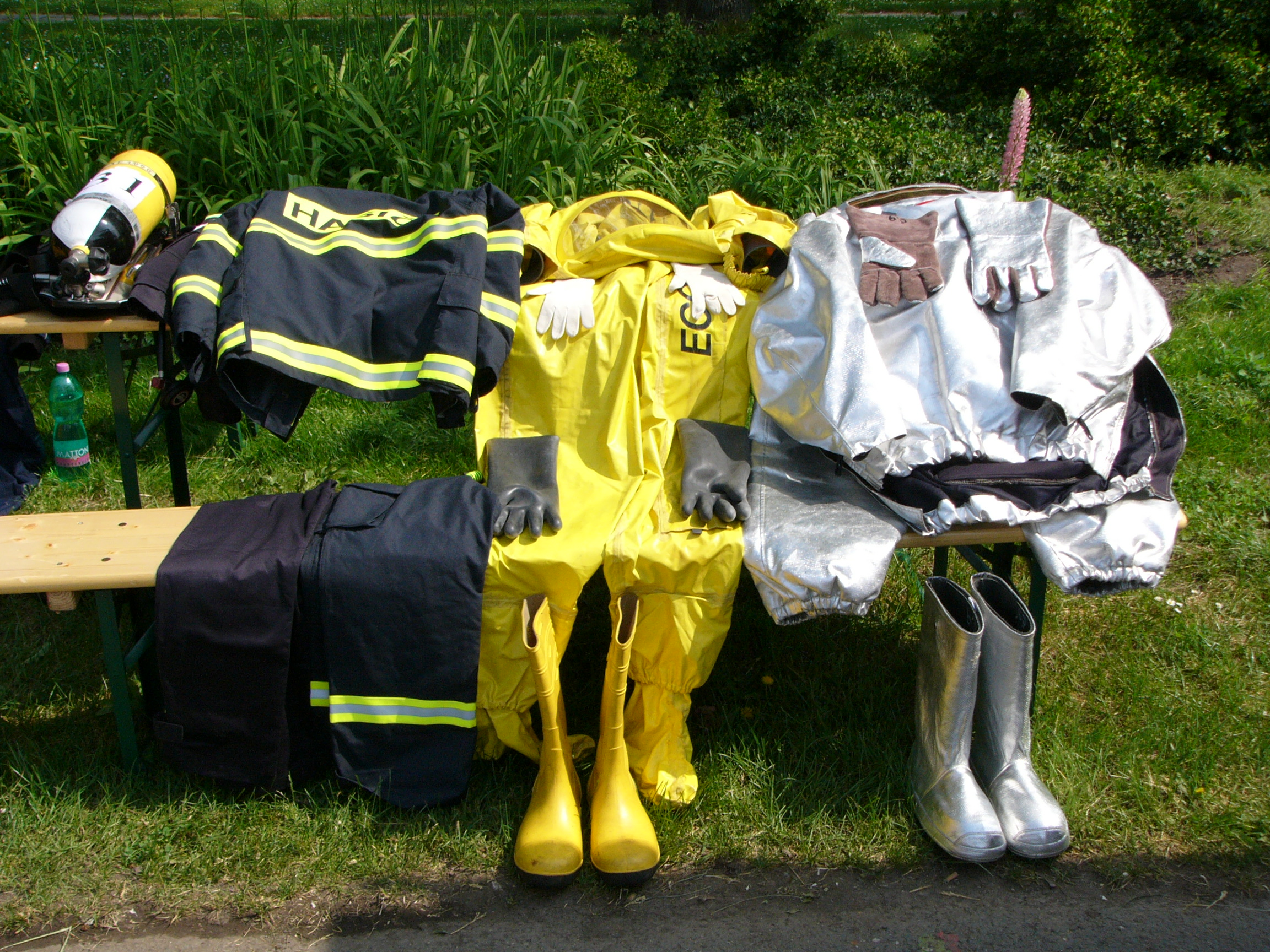
Turnout gear used by firefighters in the Czech Republic: Common turnout coat and turnout pants (dark with reflective safety stripes on the left), hazmat suit (yellow in the middle), and fire proximity suit (silver on the right)

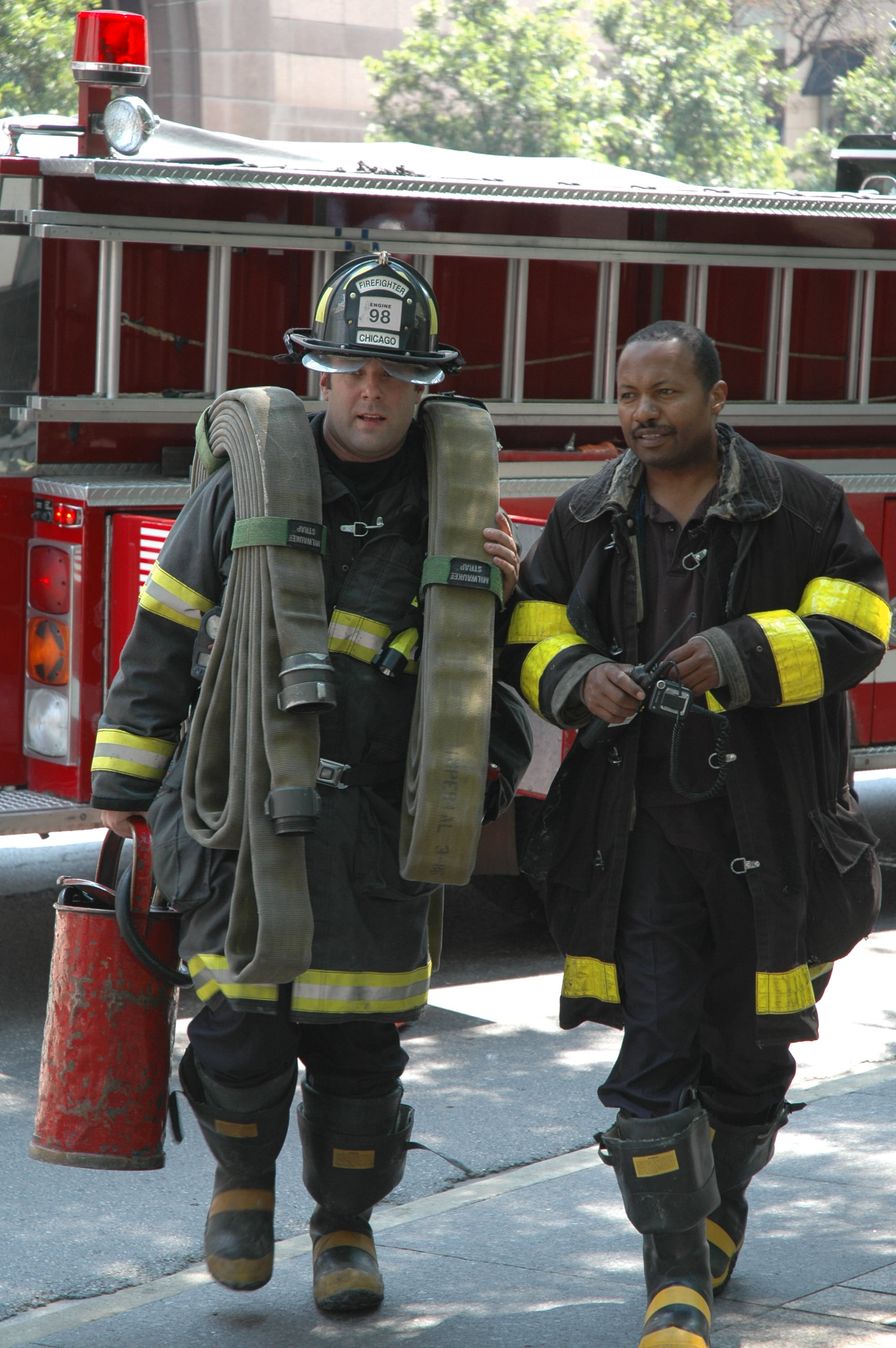
Firefighters in Chicago wearing rubber three-quarter boots and jacket

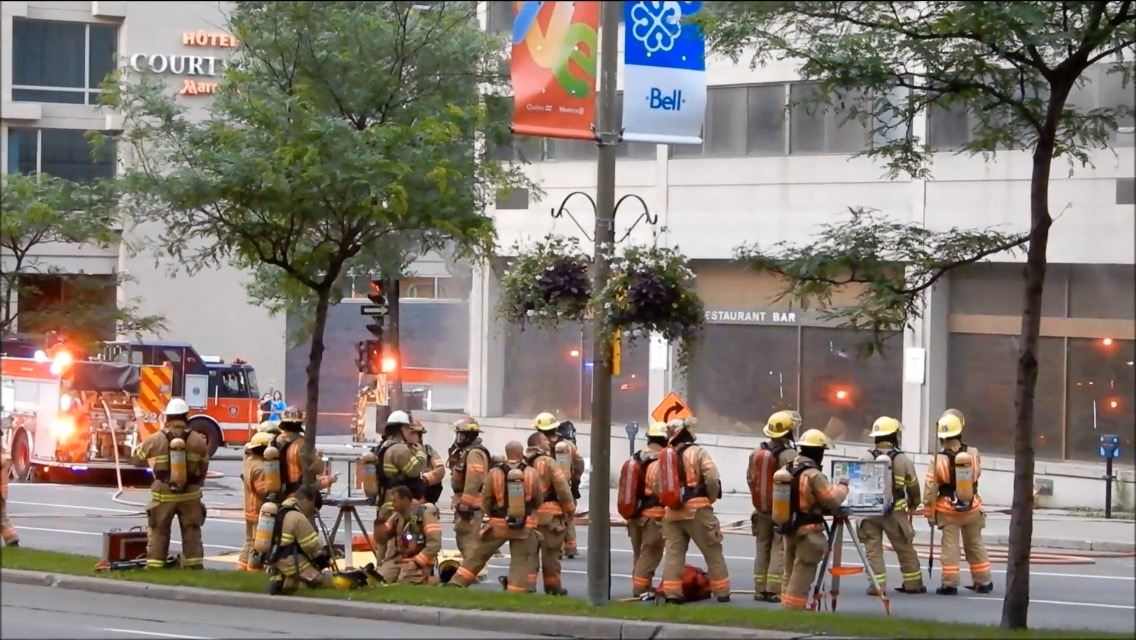
Firefighters in Montreal in full turnout gear during a fire

Bunker gear (also known as turnout gear, fire kit and incident gear) is the personal protective equipment (PPE) used by firefighters. The term is derived from the fact that the trousers and boots are traditionally kept by firefighters' bunks at the fire station to be readily available for use.

== History ==
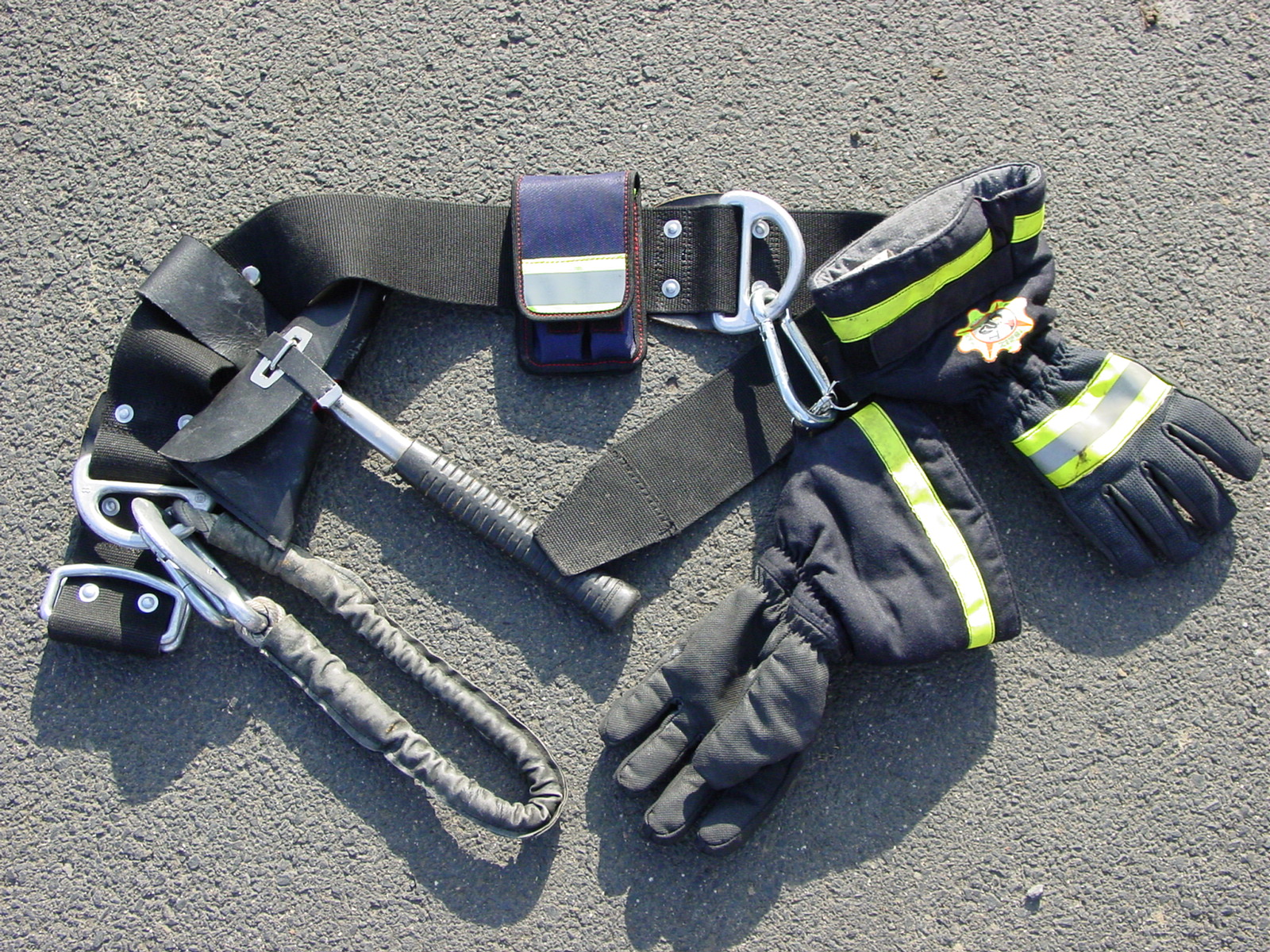
Toolbelt with gloves and tools

The modern firefighter's helmet was developed in 1830 by luggage maker Henry Gratacap, a volunteer firefighter in New York City. This helmet is recognizable today as the "New York" style of helmet, and has retained the same basic shape. The helmet had a brimmed front to affix a leather shield, usually adorned with a company name and number. It featured eight rib sections on the dome for added rigidity and a long rear brim that channeled water away from the wearer's neck.

The combination of modern triple-layer turnout gear with self-contained breathing apparatus (SCBA), personal alert safety system (PASS) device, and modern communications equipment is intended to provide protection against smoke, heat, water, steam, flashovers, and even direct flame for a short time. Modern turnout jackets and pants are made of fire-retardant fabrics, mainly aramids such as Nomex and Kevlar or polybenzimidazole (PBI).

In the United States, the National Fire Protection Association publishes the requirements for fire protective clothing under NFPA 1971, Standard on Protective Ensembles for Structural Fire Fighting and Proximity Fire Fighting. In order to comply with the NFPA standard, protective clothing is required to be tested and certified by independent third-parties, and bear the certifying body's logo and a compliance statement. Such third-party certifications are issued by the Safety Equipment Institute (SEI) and UL Solutions.

== See also ==
- Hazmat suit – Protective suit against chemical, bacteriological, and nuclear risks
- Firefighter's helmet
- PASS device – Device used to set off an alarm when a firefighter is in distress
- Self-contained breathing apparatus – Breathing gas supplied respirator carried by the user
