= Higbee cut =

Cut in a screw thread

Higbee cut on male thread

A Higbee cut is a specific modification added to the end of a screw thread to create a blunt start, replacing the sharp end typically found on unmodified threads. Named after its inventor Clinton Higbee, this feature reduces the risk of cross-threading when applied to both male and female threads. A blunt-start thread with a Higbee cut is also referred to as a convoluted thread.

== History ==
Clinton Higbee invented and patented the blunt start thread in 1891.

== Common uses ==
=== Fire service ===
The Higbee cut is commonly used on the threads of fire hose couplings. The cut's presence and the thread's starting point are often marked on couplings to facilitate proper assembly.

=== Thread gauges ===
Gauging used to inspect machine threads often includes a Higbee cut.
