= Self-contained breathing apparatus =

Breathing gas supplied respirator carried by the user

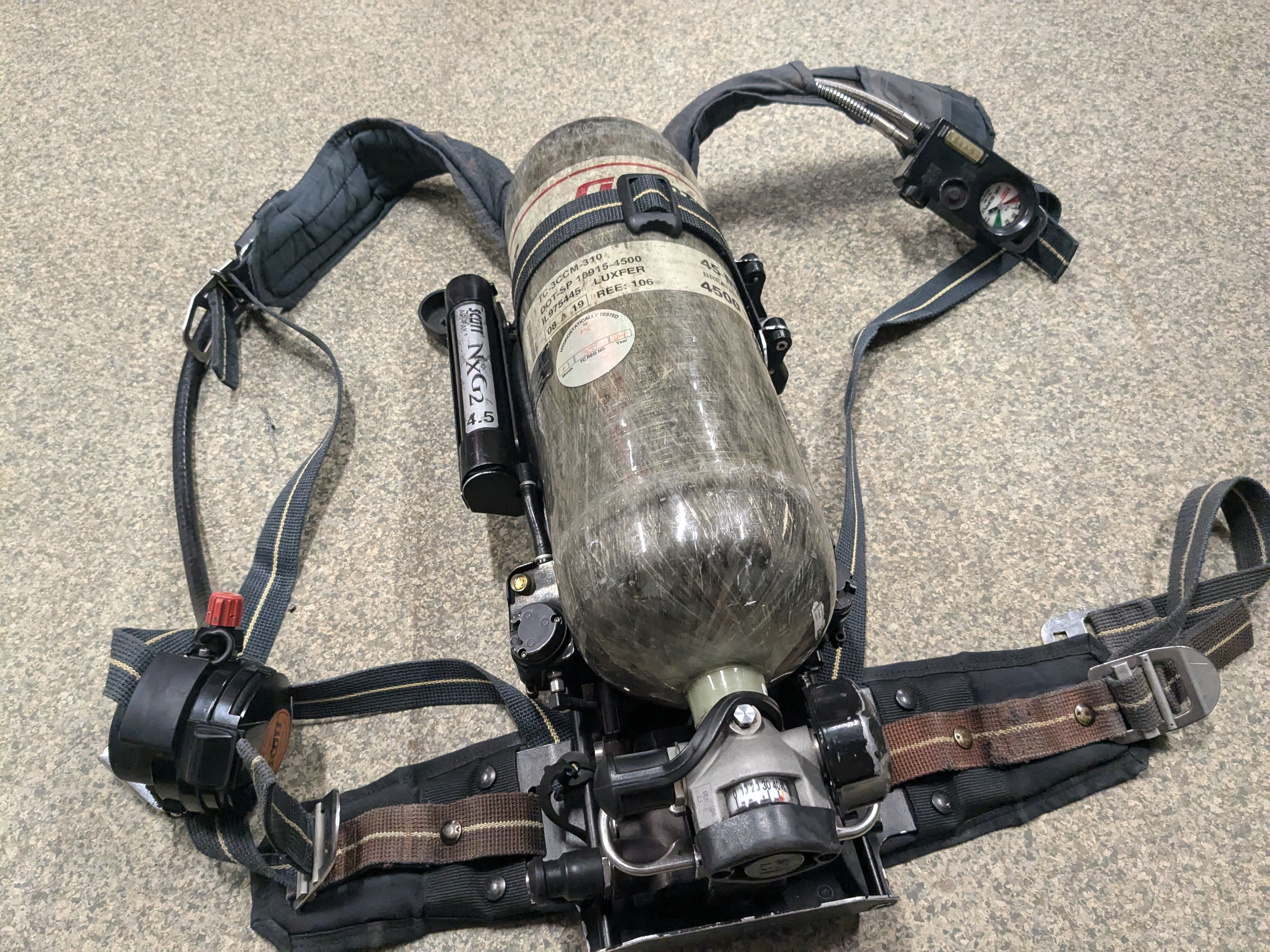
- Other name(s): SCBA, breathing apparatus, compressed-air breathing apparatus
- Regulated by: National Institute for Occupational Safety and Health, National Fire Protection Association, Canadian Standards Association
- Regulation: 42 CFR 84, EN 137, NFPA 1981
- NIOSH schedule: TC-13F
- [edit on Wikidata]

A self-contained breathing apparatus (SCBA) is a respirator worn to provide an autonomous supply of breathable gas in an atmosphere that is immediately dangerous to life or health from a gas cylinder. They are typically used in firefighting and industry. The term self-contained means that the SCBA is not dependent on a remote supply of breathing gas (e.g., through a long hose). They are sometimes called industrial breathing sets. Some types are also referred to as a compressed air breathing apparatus (CABA) or simply breathing apparatus. Unofficial names include air pack, air tank, oxygen cylinder or simply pack, terms used mostly in firefighting. If designed for use under water, it is also known as a scuba set (self-contained underwater breathing apparatus).

An open circuit SCBA typically has three main components: a high-pressure gas storage cylinder, (e.g., 2,216 to 5,500 psi (15,280 to 37,920 kPa), about 150 to 374 atmospheres), a pressure regulator, and a respiratory interface, which may be a mouthpiece, half mask or full-face mask, assembled and mounted on a framed carrying harness.

A self-contained breathing apparatus may be open-circuit or closed-circuit, and open circuit units may be demand supplied or continuous-flow.

== History ==
As the fire service began to develop throughout the early 1800s, it became increasingly apparent that firefighters needed protection from the hazardous smoke and toxic gasses that were present when fighting fires. The earliest attempts at this included firefighters growing out long beards, dipping them in water, and then biting down on the beard while breathing through their mouth. The theory behind this was that the wet beard would act as some sort of filter for the smoke. Other early attempts included the French designed "Apparatus Aldini" which was an asbestos and woven wire mask which attempted to provide the user with a small amount of trapped clean air to breathe. In addition, there was an English-designed closed helmet that pumped clean air across a pane of glass to reduce breathing condensation.

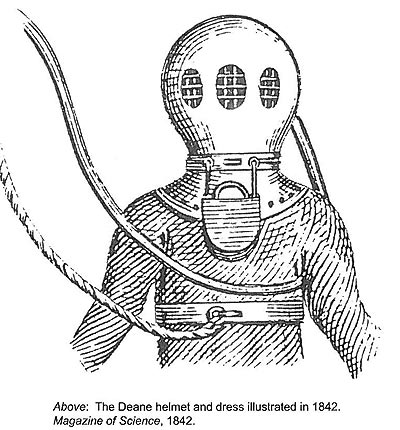
1842 sketch of the Deane brothers' diving helmet, the first surface-supplied diving dress equipment in the world.

Inspired by a fire accident they witnessed in a stable in England, the brothers Charles and John Deane designed and patented a "Smoke Helmet" to be used by firemen in smoke-filled areas in 1823. The apparatus comprised a copper helmet with an attached flexible collar and garment. A long leather hose attached to the rear of the helmet was to be used to supply air - the original concept being that it would be pumped using a double bellows. A short pipe allowed air to escape, as more was pumped in. The user breathed from the airflow as it passed the face. The garment was made of leather or airtight cloth, secured by straps. The first successful diving helmet was developed from this by Augustus Siebe, of London.

An early firefighting breathing apparatus was designed by James Braidwood. Around 1825, he invented a mask that was connected to a long hose which was supplied with fresh air from a fire engine. A whistle was also attached to the mask for communications. This could be considered to be one of the first attempts of a PASS or Personal Alert Safety System device.

Paul Hashagan also notes that, in 1863, A. Lacour developed and patented the "improved breathing apparatus". This system provided air to the wearer from two canvas and rubber balloon-like bags which were carried on the wearer's back. A pair of bellows would then allow the wearer to pump air to a mouthpiece. The firefighter would also wear goggles and a nose plug to provide further protection from the smoke and heat.

Throughout the 1800s, other SCBA-like devices were developed by various people including a closed-circuit rebreather designed by Bernhard Draeger. The closed circuit system developed by him would not only be used by many fire departments, but also was one of the first working SCUBA systems. Other devices included the Gibbs which was approved for use in 1920 and was developed by MSA and the Proto, which was developed by the London-based company Siebe Gorman.

Close to the mid-1900s and post WWII, Scott Aviation began developing an SCBA designed specifically for firefighting use. The first SCBA designed by Scott was called the AirPac and introduced in 1945. This was the first version of the modern SCBA as we know it today. As the space race continued throughout the 1900s, SCBA technology would continue to improve allowing the SCBAs to become less cumbersome and for firefighters to carry less weight and more air.

== Types ==
=== Closed-circuit ===
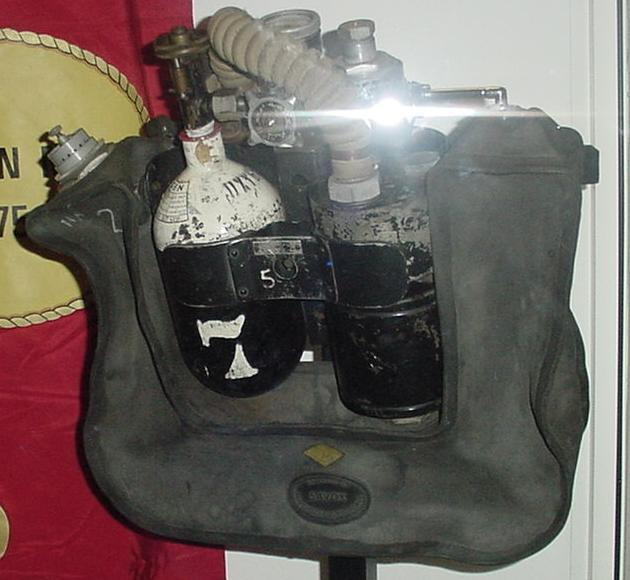
Siebe Gorman Savox in a coal mining museum

The closed-circuit type, also known as a rebreather, operates by filtering, supplementing, and recirculating exhaled gas. It is used when a longer-duration supply of breathing gas is needed, such as in mine rescue and in long tunnels, and going through passages too narrow for a big open-circuit air cylinder. Before open-circuit SCBA's were developed, most industrial breathing sets were rebreathers, such as the Siebe Gorman Proto, Siebe Gorman Savox, or Siebe Gorman Salvus. An example of modern rebreather SCBAs would be the SEFA.

==== As of 1987, under 30 CFR 11 ====
Duration of closed-circuit SCBAs is somewhere between 1–4 hours. A closed-circuit SCBA system is negative-pressure, increasing the risk of leaks.

There are two types of closed-circuit SCBA according to NIOSH:

- Uses compressed oxygen.
- Uses an oxygen-generating solid. This involves a chemical reaction between potassium superoxide with exhaled water and carbon dioxide. A chlorate candle has to be struck to start the device.

To reduce pressure buildup from use, a pressure-relief valve with saliva trap is included. Closed-circuit SCBAs are also noticeably smaller than open-circuit ones.

Self-contained self-rescue devices are also closed-circuit SCBAs, working on the same principles, being designed for emergency use in mines, and lasting about one hour.

==== 2015 ANSI definition ====
ANSI Z88.2–2015 provides some background information on SCBAs in Annex A, which is current and approved as of March 2015. Closed circuit SCBAs scrub carbon dioxide with a chemical; Z88.2 notes sodium hydroxide as an example of one such chemical.

A "demand SCBA", according to the standard, is where "the facepiece is negative during inhalation". Whereas if the facepiece is positive during inhalation, it is a "pressure-demand SCBA". Regardless of the type of closed-circuit SCBA, the duration of closed-circuit SCBAs is, according to Z88.2, between "15 minutes to 4 hours".

=== Open-circuit ===
==== As of 1987, under 30 CFR 11 ====
SCBA packs carried on a rack in a firetruck

30 CFR 11 approval label for an open-circuit, pressure-demand SCBA respirator

An open-circuit SCBA does not recirculate air; it instead allows respired air to be exhausted outside. While 30 CFR 11 does not restrict the gas that can be used (although compressed air is usually chosen), use of compressed oxygen is not allowed due to the system's exposure to outside air. Duration is usually limited to 30–60 minutes.

There are two types of open-circuit SCBA according to NIOSH:

- Demand: 2000 psi to the regulator from the main valve, plus a bypass valve in case of failure, with a two-stage regulator reducing pressure to 50-100 psi.
- Pressure-Demand: Similar to demand, but with a spring in the diaphragm, which holds the admission valve open, for continuous air flow to the facepiece.

NIOSH emphasizes that facepieces between both SCBA types cannot be interchanged, but certain SCBAs can be switched to both 'demand' and 'pressure-demand' operation. However, both modes require different training.

==== 2015 ANSI definition ====
Z88.2–2015 notes that "open-circuit SCBA are equipped with a full facepiece or tight-fitting hood", and, like closed-circuit SCBAs, can be configured in pressure-demand or demand mode. Air is not recirculated in an open-circuit SCBA.

Z88.2 notes that these SCBAs normally use compressed air, but can also use cryogenic air or compressed oxygen. However, the standard warns that "the actual service time is usually less than the NIOSH rated service time". If compressed air is used, Z88.2 requires the use of "CGA G7.1–2011 Grade D breathing air".

==== Common traits ====
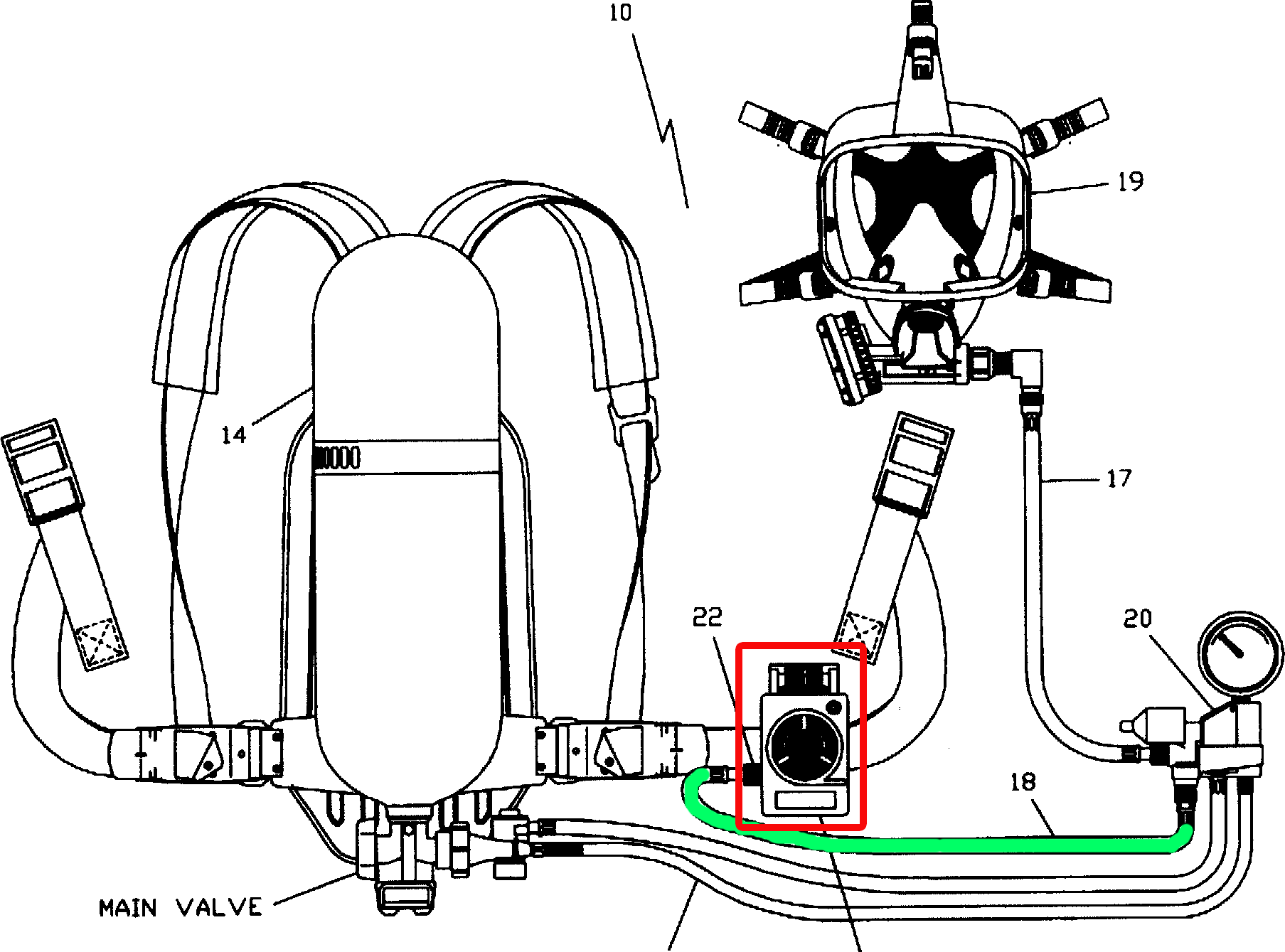
SCBA pack with PASS device (ADSU)

Open-circuit industrial breathing sets are filled with filtered, compressed air. Typical open-circuit systems have two stage regulators. The first stage reduces the pressure from storage pressure of up to more than 300 bar to about 10 bar for supply to the second stage on the mask, which further reduces it to just above atmospheric pressure via a demand valve when the pressure drops on inhalation. A positive pressure mask has the demand valve set to close when the pressure inside the mask is slightly above the external ambient pressure, so when the mask is removed from the face or leaks around the skirt, the demand valve will free-flow.

An open-circuit rescue or firefighting SCBA has a full-face mask, also called the face-piece, a demand regulator, air cylinder, pressure gauge, (sometimes with an integrated PASS device), and a harness with adjustable shoulder straps and waist belt which lets it be worn on the back. The air cylinder is commonly 4 liter, 6 liter, or 6.8 liter, but other sizes are also available. The endurance of the cylinder can be calculated from the volume, pressure and breathing rate of the user. The formula: volume (in liters) × pressure (in bars) / 40 (litres per minute) - 10 minutes (the 10 minutes is a safety margin, or reserve), so a 6-liter cylinder, of 300 bar, is 6 × 300 / 40 - 10 = 35 minutes working duration. The fitness and level of exertion of the wearer affect breathing rate, and result in variations of the actual usable time of the SCBA.

Air cylinders are made of aluminium, steel, or of a composite construction (usually glass or carbon-fiber wrapped.) The composite cylinders are the lightest in weight and are therefore preferred by fire departments (UK: fire and rescue services previously called fire brigades), but they also have the shortest lifespan and must be taken out of service after 15 years. Air cylinders must be hydrostatically tested every 5 years. During extended operations, empty air cylinders can be quickly replaced with fresh ones and then refilled from larger tanks in a cascade storage system or from an air compressor brought to the scene.

=== Continuous-flow ===
Escape SCBAs, also known as ESCBAs, are intended for escape from IDLH situations only, and when fitted with hoods are operated in continuous flow mode. They are usually limited to 3–10 minutes endurance.

== Differences under 42 CFR 84 ==
42 CFR 84 replaces the 30 CFR 11 respirator regulation used by NIOSH. As of 2001, quality assurance of SCBA harnesses is required. Labels have been updated to remove MSHA emblems from respirator labels, as MSHA is no longer involved in respirator approval except for respirators approved for mining. As a result, new SCBAs now have to specify whether the SCBA is "intended for mine use".

Updated SCBA labels under 42 CFR 84
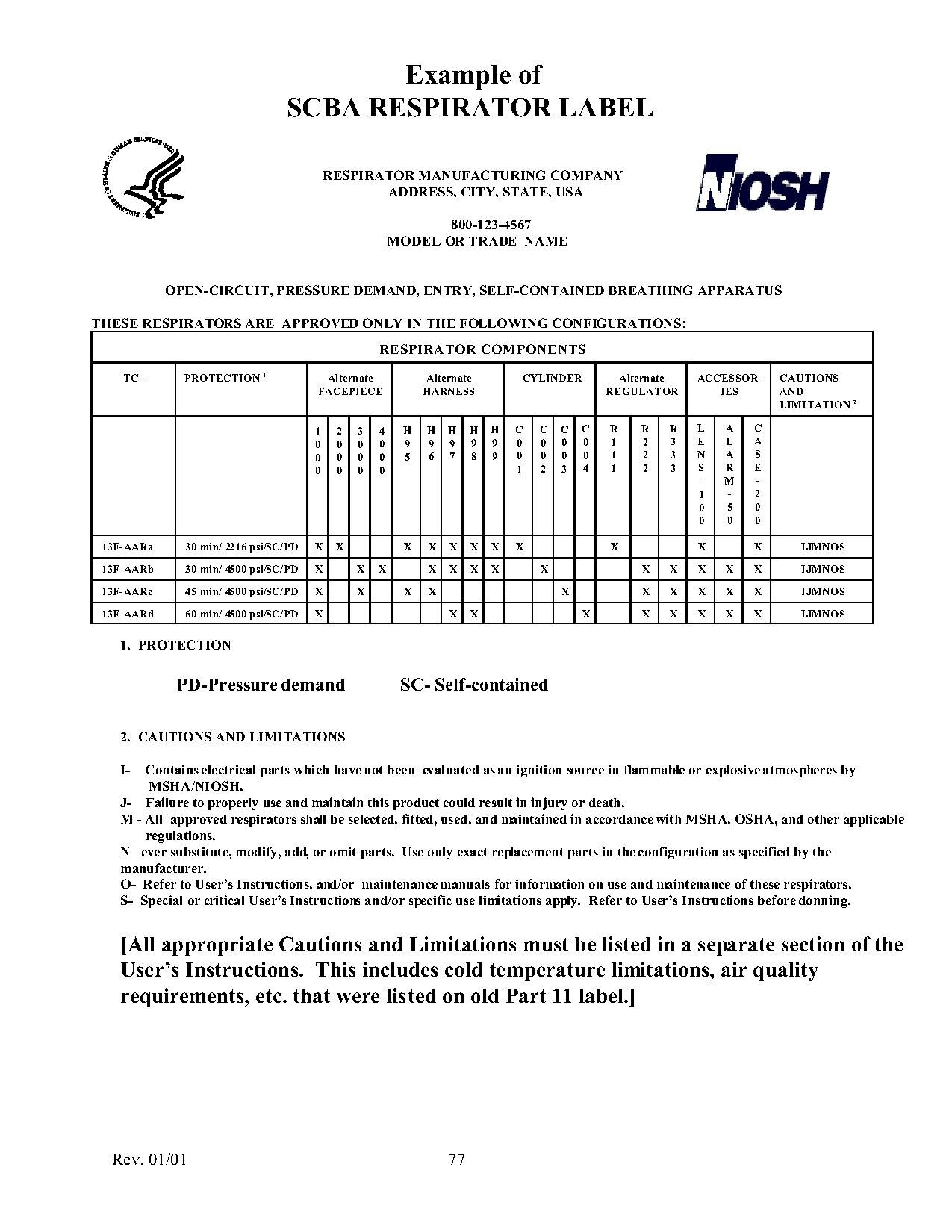
Part 84 SCBA respirator label

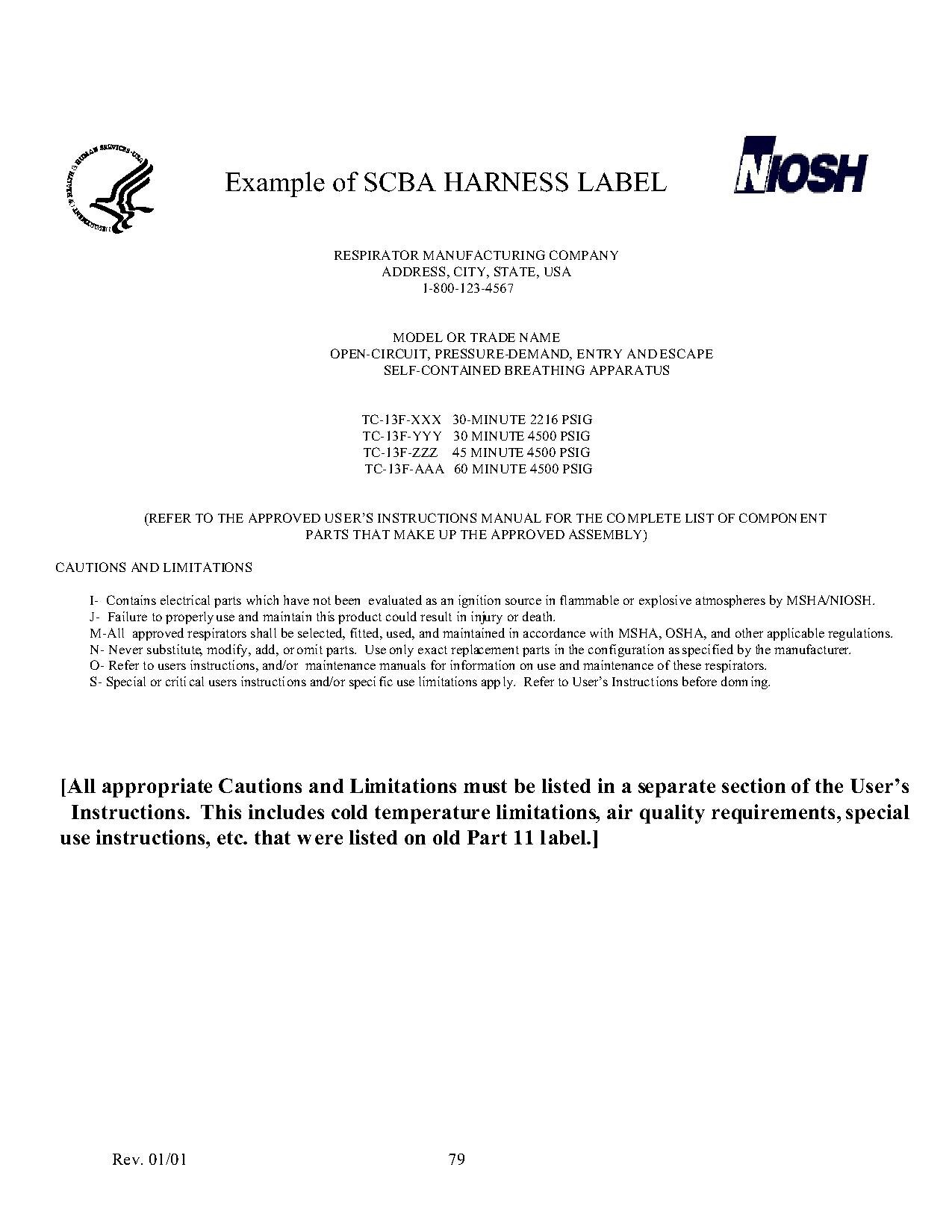
Harness label

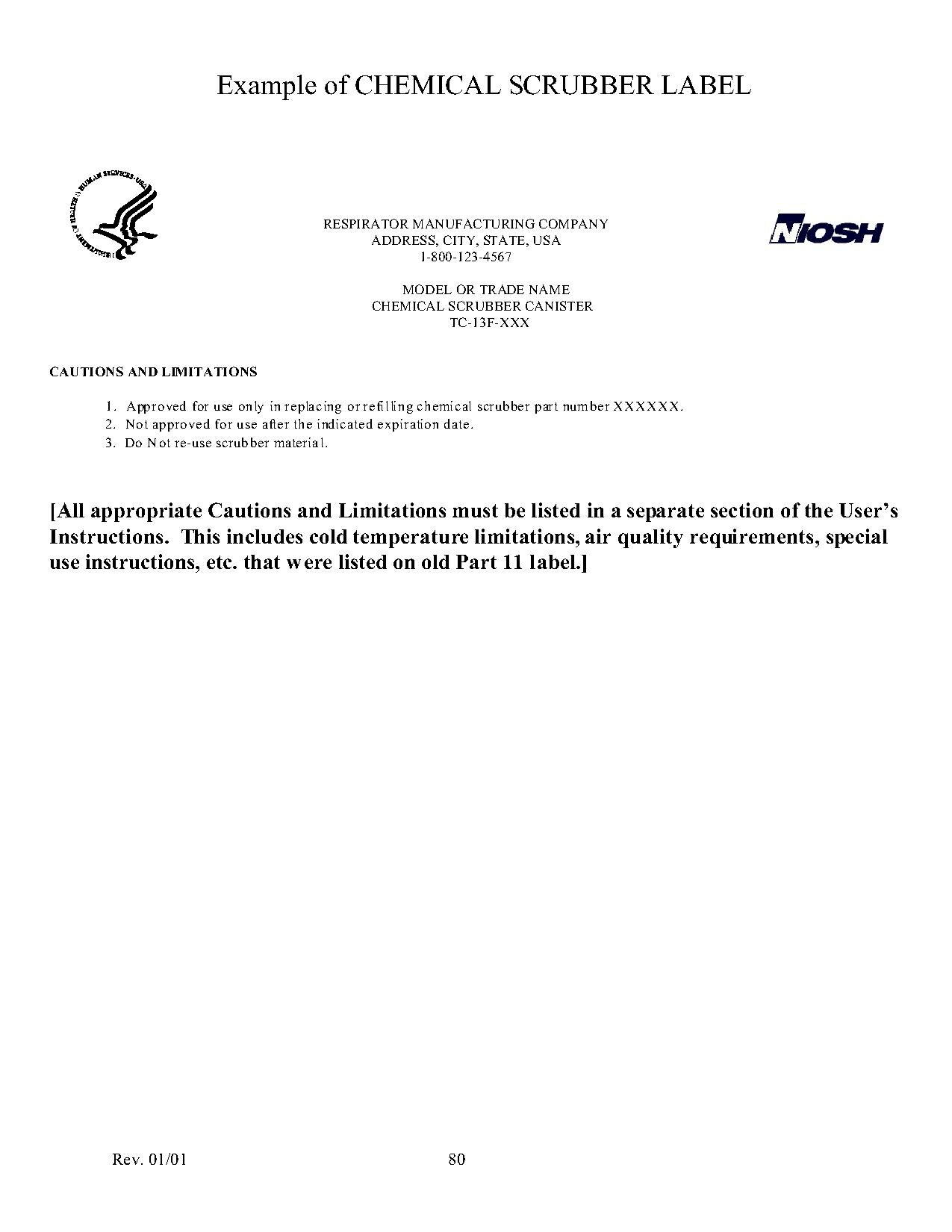
Scrubber label

== Facepiece ==
SCBAs usually come with full-facepieces, but can also come with half-mask or mouthpiece in demand or pressure-demand mode, though use of mouthpieces are limited to escapes only, as of 1987.

Hoods and helmets are limited to continuous flow mode only, and are also used in air-line respirators in addition to escape-only SCBAs.

== Usage ==
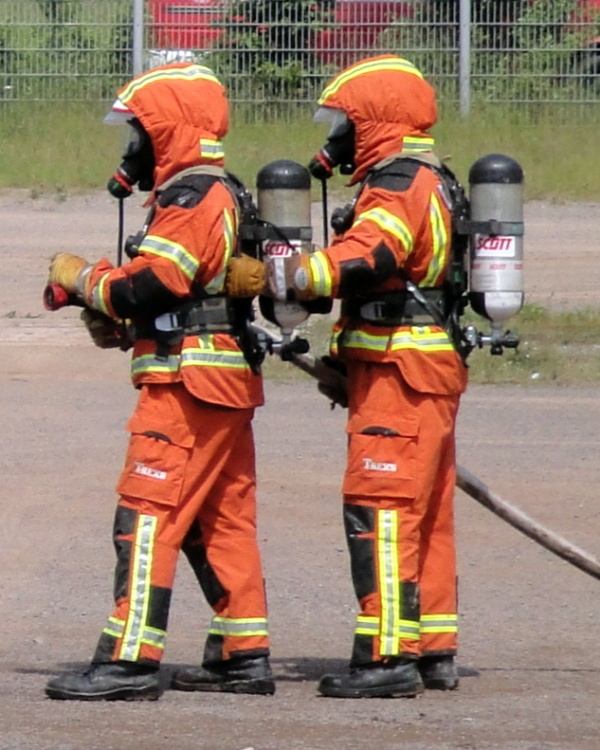
Elastomeric masks linked to backpack air tanks: self-contained breathing apparatus, worn by firefighters advancing with a firehose.

There are two major application areas for SCBA: firefighting, and industrial use in confined spaces.

For SCBAs used in firefighting, manufacturers typically prioritize fire resistance and weight reduction over cost. SCBAs used by the fire service also incorporate other features such as a PASS (personal alert safety system), which is a device that emits a loud alarm should the firefighter manually activate it or remain motionless for a certain amount of time. Other features may include Bluetooth connection to voice amplifiers or portable radios, digital heads-up displays, built-in infrared cameras, ePAR (electronic personal accountability report) system, point of view video recording, and digital screens allowing the firefighter to more easily check their air supply. Every SCBA used in the fire service also comes with a vibralert system which alerts the firefighter as they get low on air and a UAC (universal air connection), which allows the firefighter to give or receive air to other SCBAs through a trans-fill line by equalizing the pressure in both SCBA cylinders. Some SCBAs also come with a buddy-breather setup which allows both firefighters to connect their SCBAs and breathe while connected to each other.

SCBAs are also used in a variety of industrial settings including mining, petrochemical, chemical, and nuclear industries. In some of the most hazardous conditions, SCBAs can be worn in conjunction with gas tight suits, which also aids in decontamination procedures. In the industrial setting, especially in confined spaces, a user will often be supplied air through a pressurized airline and will only carry compressed air cylinders for emergency escape and decontamination.

== Other regulations and standards ==
Volunteer fire fighter exiting live burn structure wearing NIOSH-certified SCBA, NFPA compliant turn-out gear, and holding a pike pole

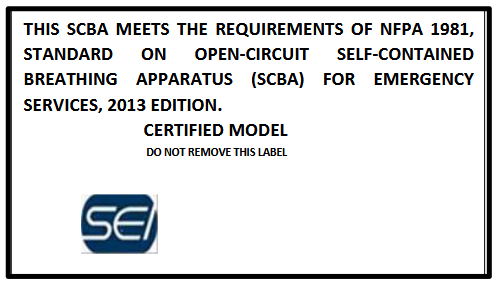
Example NFPA 1981 regulatory label

In the United States and Canada, SCBAs used in firefighting must meet guidelines established by the National Fire Protection Association, NFPA Standard 1981. If an SCBA is labeled as "1981 NFPA compliant", it is designed for firefighting. The current version of the standard was published in 2018. These standards are revised every five years. Similarly, the National Institute for Occupational Safety and Health (NIOSH) has a certification program for SCBA that are intended to be used in chemical, biological, radiological, and nuclear (CBRN) environments.

Any SCBA supplied for use in Europe must comply with the requirements of the Personal Protective Equipment Directive (89/686/EEC). In practice this usually means that the SCBA must comply with the requirements of the European Standard EN 137:2006. This includes detailed requirements for the performance of the SCBA, the marking required, and the information to be provided to the user. Two classes of SCBA are recognised, Type 1 for industrial use and Type 2 for firefighting. Any SCBA conforming to this standard will have been verified to reliably operate and protect the user from -30 °C to +60 °C under a wide range of severe simulated operational conditions.

== Human factors ==
SCBA is intended to be personal protective equipment, but its use is not without cost. The weight of the unit and work of breathing affect the work capacity and agility of the wearer, and the full-face mask, while protecting the face and eyes from heat, smoke, and toxic gases, also reduces peripheral vision and awareness of the surroundings. The weight and harness straps may limit tidal volume, ventilation rate, and oxygen consumption, and heart rate may increase in comparison with the same exercise levels without the equipment. Shoulder harness straps of heavy SCBA can reduce free motion of the thorax which affects breathing.

== See also ==
- Escape breathing apparatus
- National Institute for Occupational Safety and Health (NIOSH), regulator of SCBAs in the United States – US federal government agency
- Fire Fighter Fatality Investigation and Prevention Program, NIOSH investigations on causes of firefighter fatalities
- Glossary of firefighting terms
- Respirator – Device worn to protect the user from inhaling contaminants
- PASS device (personal alert safety system), also known as ADSU (automatic distress signal unit) – Device used to set off an alarm when a firefighter is in distress
- SCUBA – Self-contained underwater breathing apparatus
- Smoke hood, also known as Short Term Air Supply (STAS) – Device to protect the user from smoke inhalation in an emergency
