= Suction hose =

Drafting fire hose made to withstand vacuum

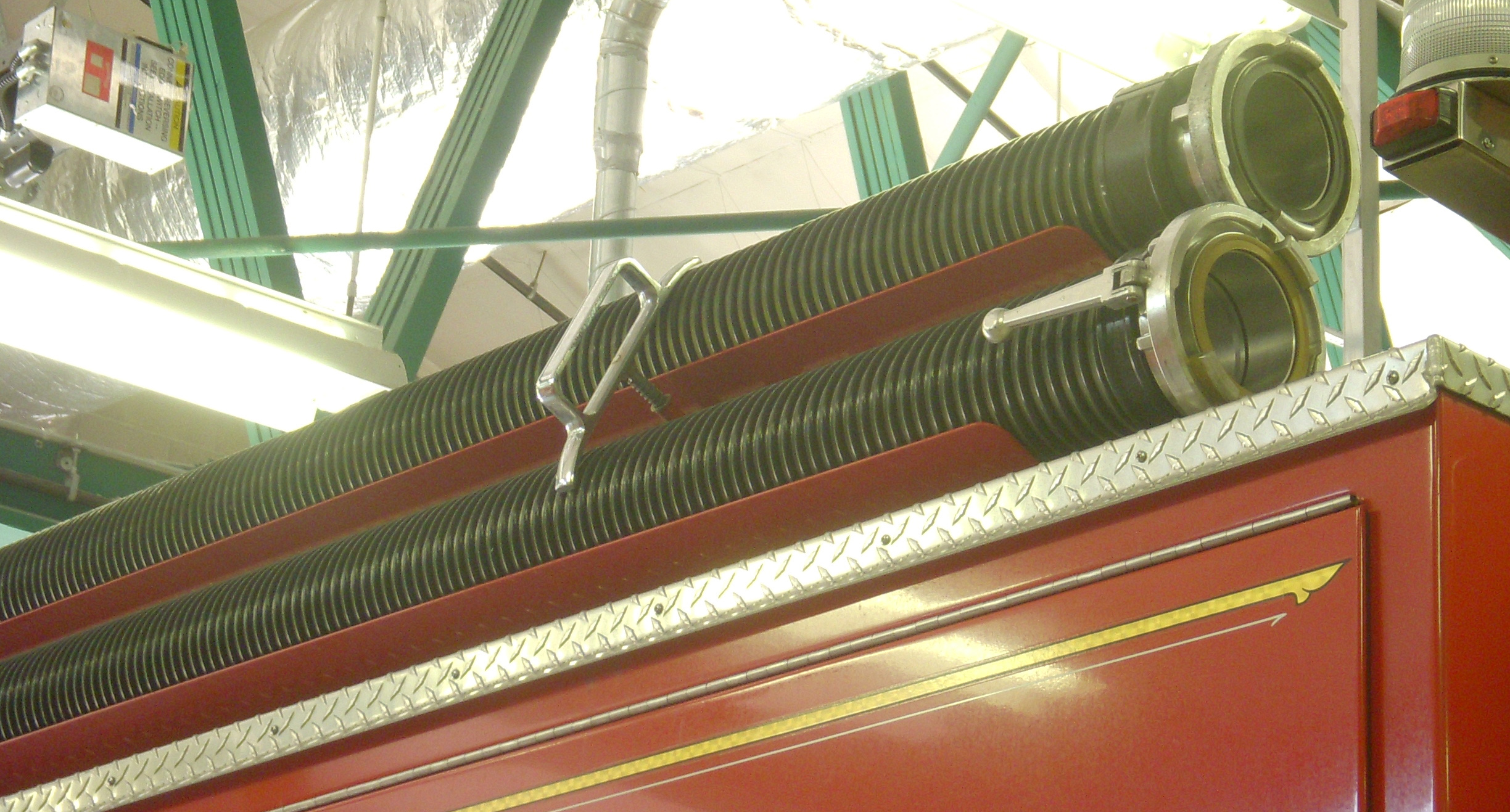
5-inch (13 cm) flex suction hose with Storz fittings, mounted on a fire engine

Suction hose is a specific type of fire hose used in drafting operations, when a fire engine uses a vacuum to draw water from a portable water tank, pool, or other static water source. It is built to withstand vacuum, rather than pressure, along with abrasion and heat. Flexible suction hose ("flex suction") is meant to be used only for suction. Hard suction hose is capable of withstanding pressure as well as vacuum. Suction hose is used in both structural and wildland firefighting throughout the world, and is made in various diameters and connection types. In the United States, it is standard equipment for fire engines per National Fire Protection Association (NFPA) standards.

== Usage ==
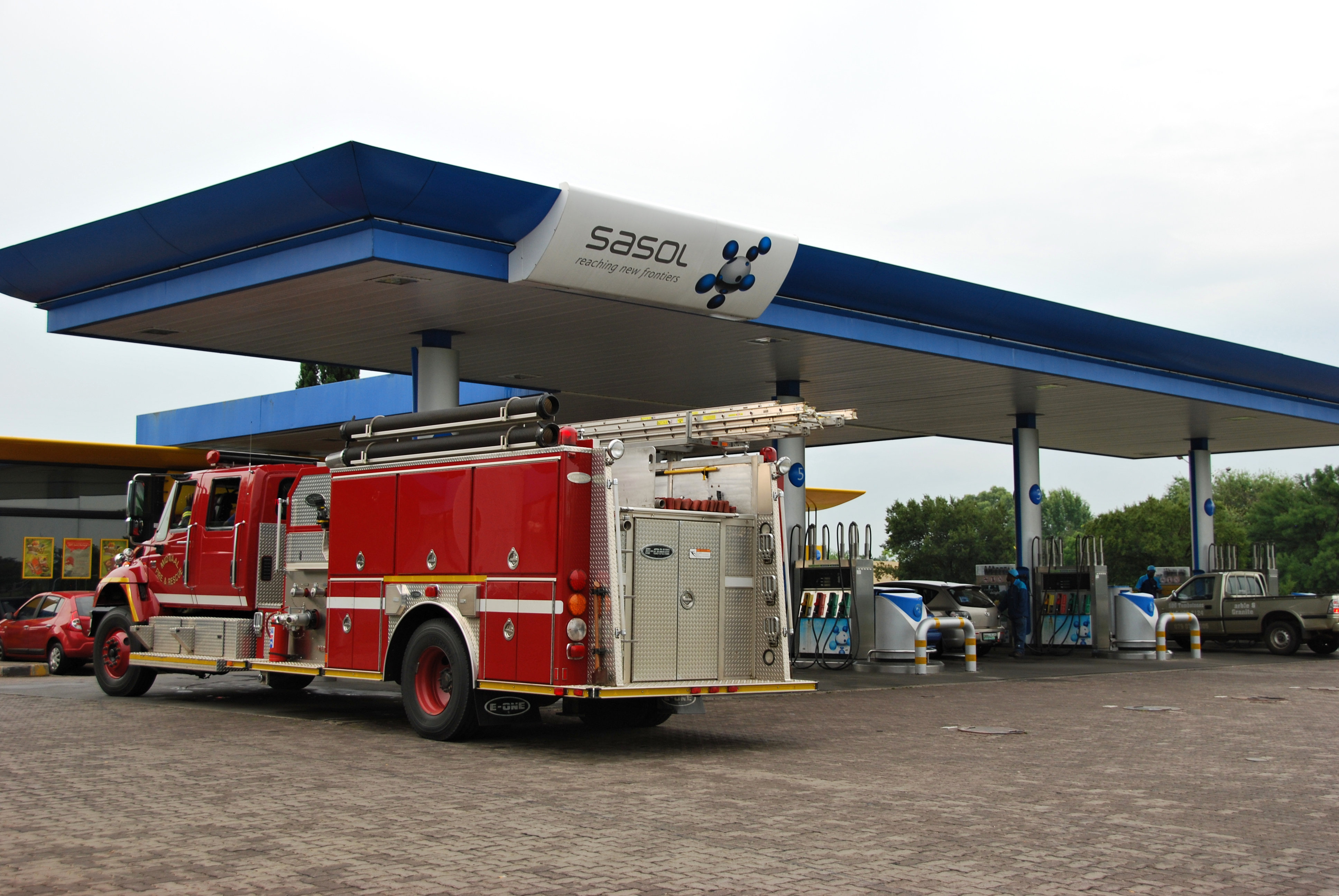
A fire engine with suction hose visible near the rear of the vehicle, opposite ladders

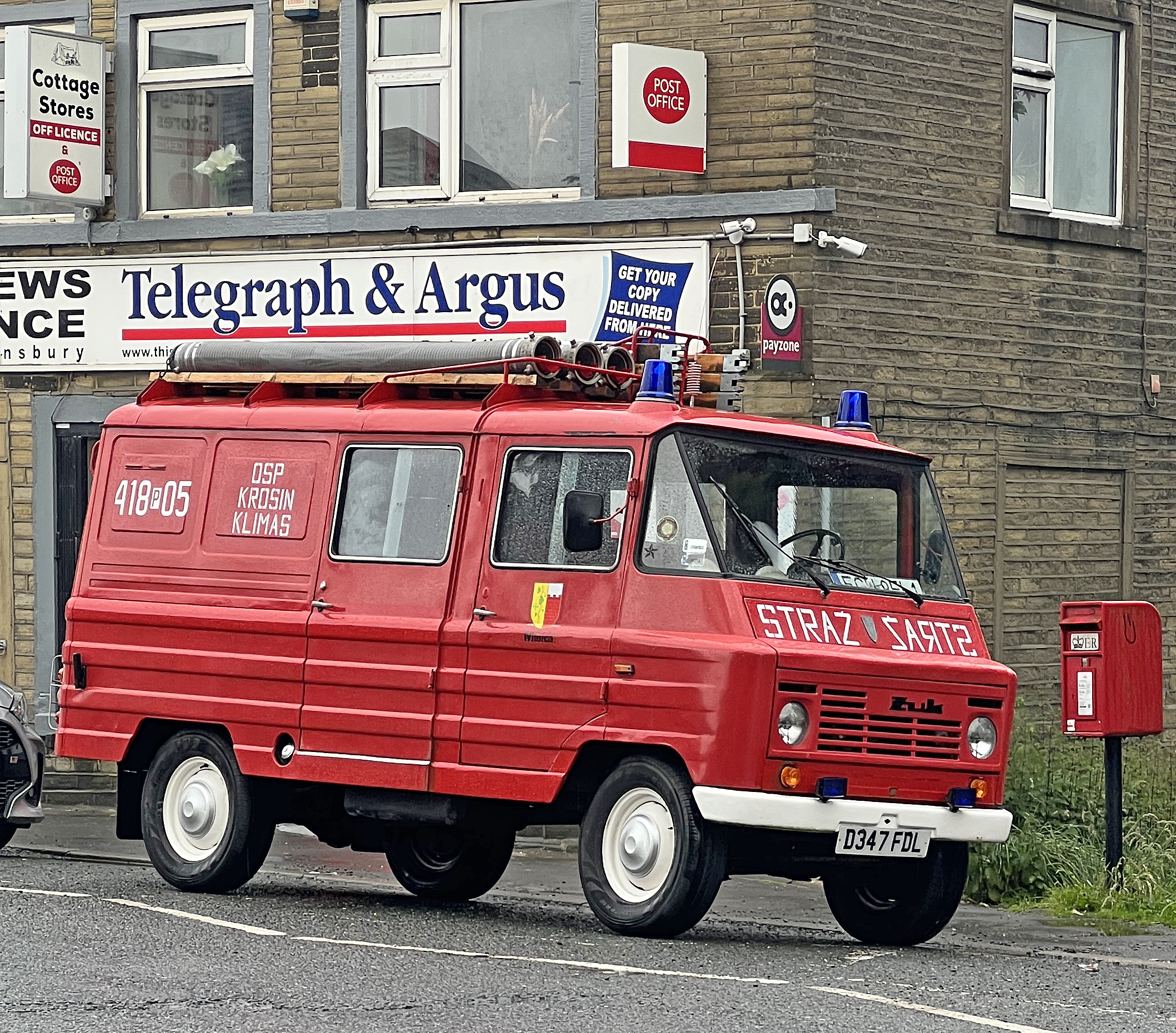
A fire vehicle with suction hose visible on its roof

Flexible suction hose is a specific type of rigid fire hose used in drafting operations. When using this technique, the fire engine draws water for fire fighting from an unpressurized supply, such as a portable water tank, pool, or other static water source, instead of drawing water from a pressurized water supply, such as a fire hydrant. Under total vacuum conditions, a pump could lift water 33.9 feet (10.3 m) in standard atmosphere conditions; however, pumps on fire apparatus are not capable of producing a total vacuum. Due to this limitation and friction loss, fire services do not recommend attempting to lift water more than 3 metres (9.8 ft).

Hard suction hose may also be used to connect a fire engine to a hydrant, due to its ability to handle both vacuum and pressure. Using hard suction hose in this manner requires that the fire engine be positioned carefully for the limited flexibility of the hose, and may require multiple firefighters due to the weight and bulk of the hose section. The use of flexible suction in this capacity is both ineffective and hazardous, as the hose and couplings may experience catastrophic failure. In certain circumstances, it may be possible to use hard suction hose to draft from a hydrant with adequate water supply but a low flow rate.

Flexible suctions are built to withstand vacuum, rather than water pressure, abrasion, and heat. They are, therefore, constructed differently from the standard fire hose and have different end fittings. In the United States, they are standard equipment according to the National Fire Protection Association (NFPA) standards for fire engines. Since neither hard suction nor flexible suction hose can be folded, it is typically mounted on the side of a fire engine, often opposite ground ladders. Such hose is used in both structural and wildland firefighting throughout the world.

Hard suction hose can also be used to extend the range of a water tender's dumping capability, if the fittings of the hard suction hose match those of the tender dumping water. This could be used to fill a portable dump tank not immediately adjacent to the water tender, from which another fire engine can draft. Since water movement during dumping relies on gravity, rather than mechanical pressurization, hard suction hose is useful for this task.

== Characteristics and construction ==
Suction hose differs from standard fire hose in both its construction and usage:

1. Hard suction generally has a black opaque wrapped or laminated outer jacket surrounding a flat stock coil spring core. The inner and outer linings provide maximum rigidity, allowing it to withstand up to 200 pound per square inch gauge (psig) of pressure as well as vacuum. Flex suction is less rigid and generally corrugated in profile. Often, such hose is manufactured using molded clear or translucent synthetic material (such as PVC) shaped into a series of rings. Construction methods include heat shrinking the material over round stock coil spring core. This shape allows the hose to be somewhat flexible, without allowing it to collapse on itself under suction, as a normal, woven-jacket fire hose would.
2. It uses suction gaskets. Gaskets in standard fire hose ("pressure gaskets") are designed to minimize the water leaking out between couplings. The gaskets connecting hard suction hose sections, pump, and strainer must instead prevent air from entering at the coupling, since that would spoil the vacuum and allow air into the pump intake. Large diameter (4-inch (10 cm) or greater) hard suctions most often employ National Standard threaded brass connections while flex suction hose will typically use Storz fittings, which are genderless. 3-inch (7.6 cm) or smaller hard suction hose will typically use threaded fittings. In each case, the hard suction hose connection will match the fittings of the pump intake and supply hose, so that hard suction hose can be used in place of supply hose as appropriate.
3. It is short. Typically, suction hose comes in 10 feet (3.0 m) lengths, while fire hose comes in 50 and 100 feet (15 and 30 m) lengths. Since a fire engine's pump only produces a partial vacuum, it is only recommended for lifting water 3 metres (9.8 ft) or less. For this reason, and because each junction is an opportunity for a crack or imperfect seal to spoil the vacuum, it is rare to see many sections of hard suction hose connected together.
4. It is not designed for use in fire streams. The airtight nature of hard suction hose, necessary for drafting, renders the hose unsuitable for the high pressure water flow needed to spray a pressurized stream of water on a fire. Thus, suction hose is tested for the ability to "prevent collapse under vacuum conditions" rather than its ability to function as an attack hoseline.

Hard suction hose predates steam or gas powered fire engines and has been available since at least 1888, sometimes referred to as "spiral suction hose". Modern apparatus are commonly equipped with flexible suction as opposed to hard suction, due to the relative ease of use associated with flexibility, as well as the increasing rarity of employing suction hoses to pressurized water sources.

== Diameter ==
Suction hose comes in multiple sizes, from 2 to 6 inches (5.1 to 15.2 cm) in diameter. Large diameter hose are carried on full-size fire engines, but smaller diameters of hard suction hose can be carried on apparatus with smaller fire pump ratings, such as wildland fire engines. In the United States, NFPA 1901 requires engines to have suction hose that matches the engine's pump rating. For example, an engine with a 1,000-US-gallon (3,800 L) per minute pump is required to carry 5-inch (13 cm) or larger hose, while a wildland fire engine will typically carry 2-to-2.5-inch (5.1 to 6.4 cm) hard suction hose.

The United Kingdom, has a standardised range of metric hose diameters: 7, 9, 12.5 and 15 cm (2.8, 3.5, 4.9 and 5.9 in), with the two smallest diameters sometimes used twinned to provide adequate flow rates. Within this range, the 7 centimetres (2.8 in) hoses are fitted with "Instantaneous Couplings"; the 12.5 and 15 centimetres (4.9 and 5.9 in) hoses have Storz couplings; and the 9 centimetres (3.5 in) hose comes in two types, one with "Instantaneous Couplings" and one with Storz fittings. Fire Service Manuals provide tables of maximum volumetric flow rates for a given pump pressure, hose diameter and total hose length. The use of these tables, is to facilitate the selection of suitable hoses, taking into account the frictional losses caused by transporting water through the strainer, hoses, pump and fire fighting nozzles, to draft water from source to the fireground.

== Strainers ==
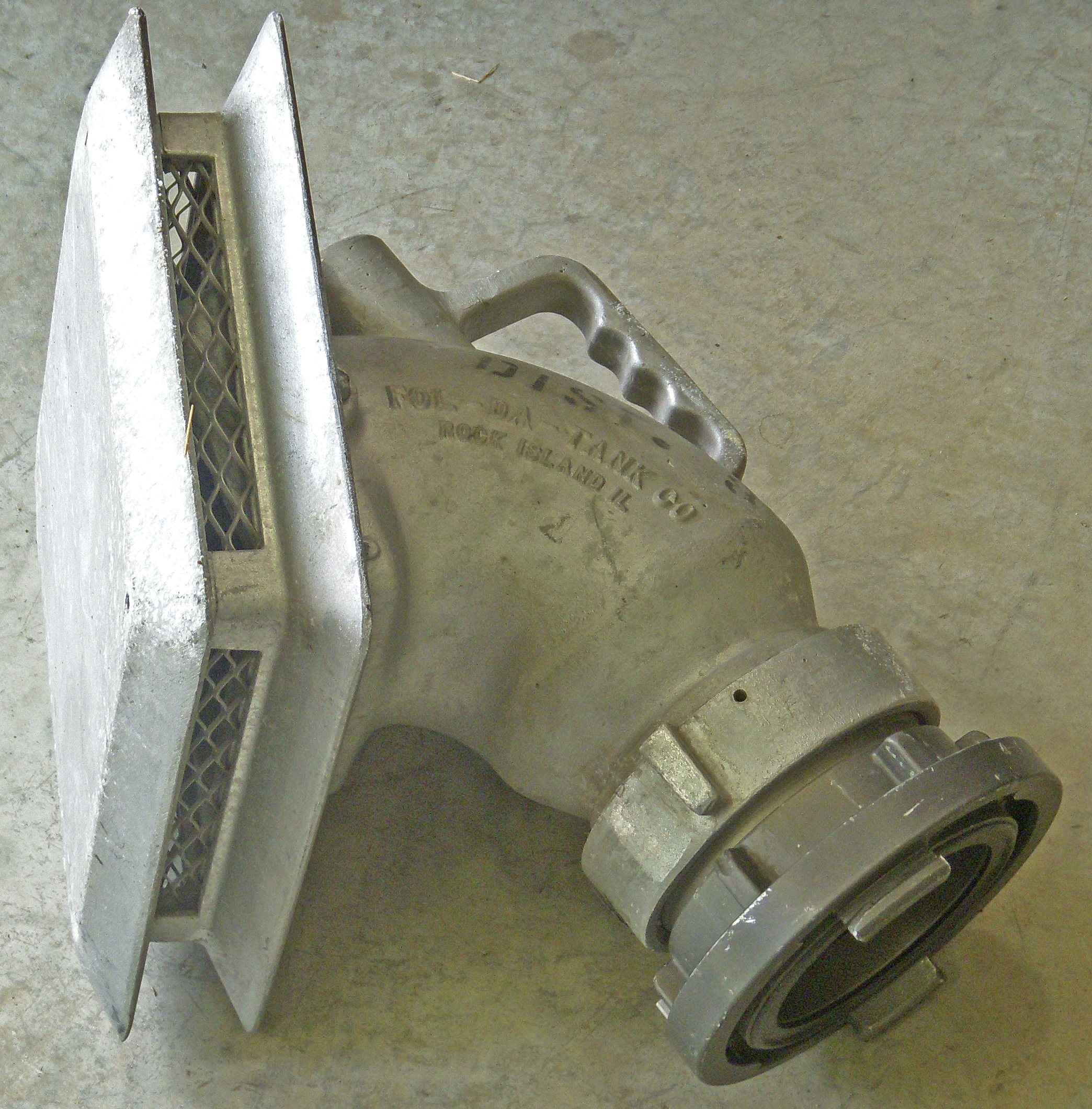
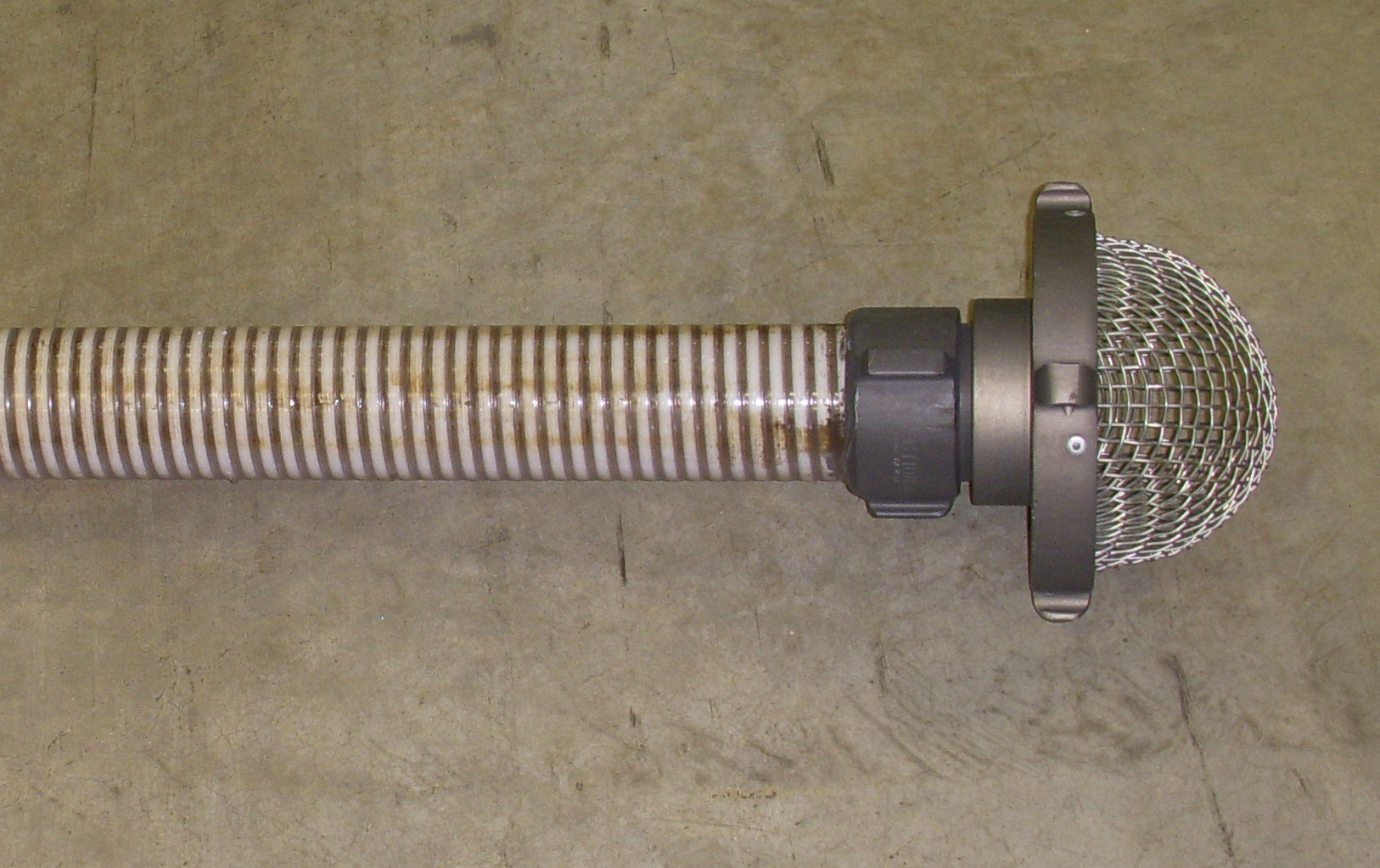
Strainer with a 5-inch (13 cm) Storz fitting (left), and strainer on a 2.5-inch (6.4 cm) diameter hard suction hose

When being used in a drafting operation from a pool, portable water tank, or other uncovered water source, the length of suction hose farthest from the pump is usually attached to a strainer, to keep foreign objects in the water from being pulled into and damaging the pump. If used in a pond, stream, or other body of water, an appropriate flotation device must be used to keep the strainer below the surface and above the bottom, so that neither mud nor air are sucked into the fire engine's pump. Industry accepted standard is to maintain two feet (0.61 m) of distance from the water's surface, bottom, or any other obstruction.

The United Kingdom official guidance is to:

- use ropes to take to the weight of the hose and the strainer, in order to avoid putting sideways loadings on the couplings;
- ensure that the strainer is a minimum of three strainer-diameters below the water surface to prevent air cavitation;
- to support the hose with packing, where necessary, when it crosses a wall or other obstruction to prevent an air pocket being formed.
