= Water tender =

Type of firefighting apparatus that specializes in the transport of water

A water tender operated by the United States Air Force Fire Protection

A water tender, sometimes known as a water tanker, is a type of firefighting apparatus that specializes in the transport of water from a water source to a fire scene. Water tenders are capable of drafting water from a stream, lake or hydrant.

This class of apparatus does not necessarily have enough pumping capacity to power large hose lines (like a fire engine), though it utilizes a smaller pump to draft from bodies of water. Water tenders are used when there is no working fire hydrant within reach of other fire equipment, potentially supplying the fire engine(s) with a very rapid connection. Most water tenders are designed to carry heavy water payloads of 2,600 U.S. gallons (2,200 imperial gallons; 9,800 liters) or more; in the United States, 1,000 U.S. gallons (830 imperial gallons; 3,800 liters) is the minimum requirement according to National Fire Protection Association standards.

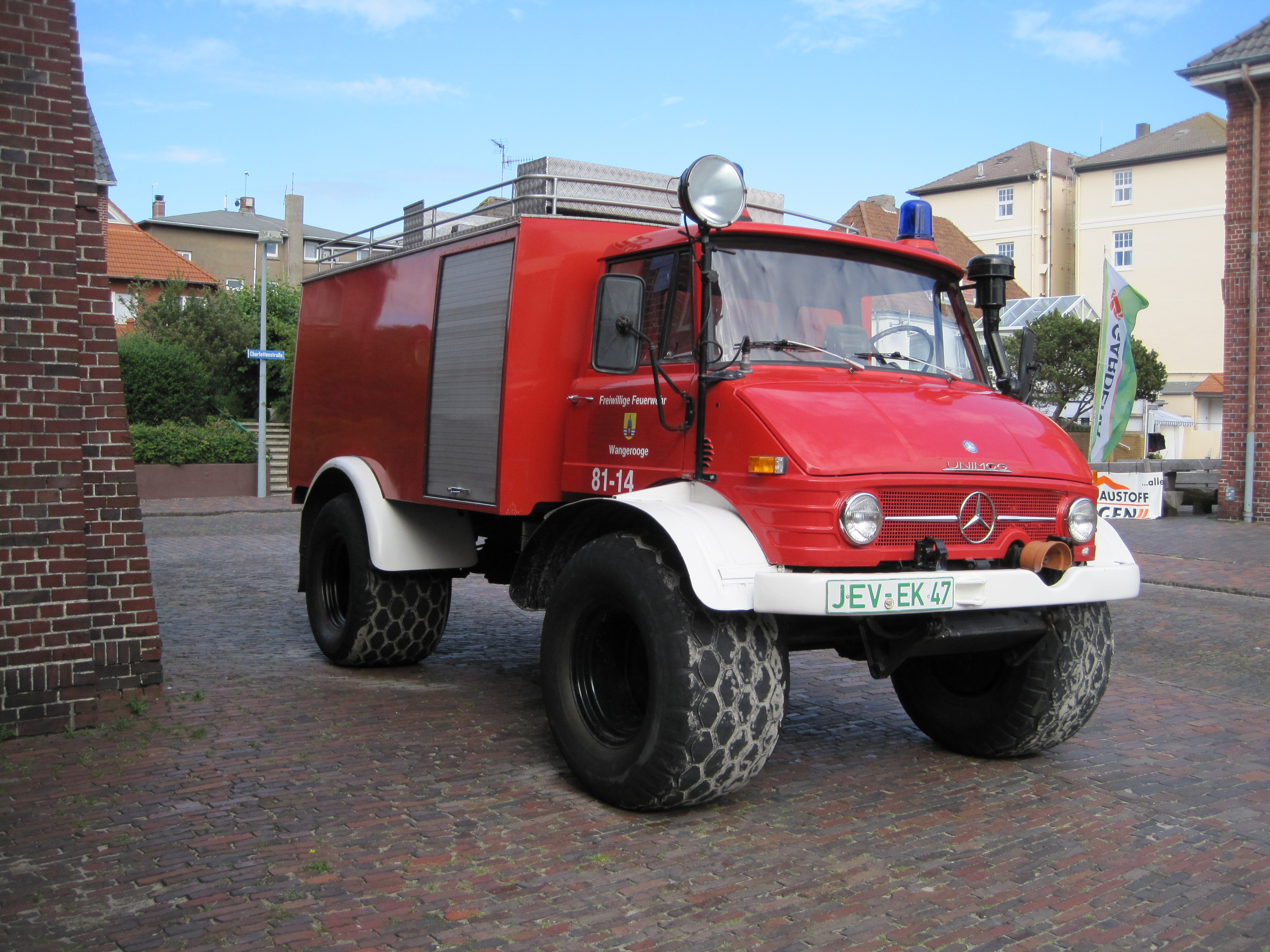
Unimog water tender with flotation tires used by the German Fire Services

Typically water tenders support engines and/or trucks like aerials during fires and hazardous material incidents. Some water tenders carry fire fighting equipment and crew much like an engine. These water tenders are able to operate relatively independently. Some water tenders actually combine a fire engine and water tender. This kind of unit may have seats for up to six firefighters, a water tank of more than 2,900 U.S. gallons (2,400 imperial gallons; 11,000 liters), and basic equipment for firefighting and rescue. This configuration may be found, for example, in rural areas, where a fire engine (with rescue equipment) and water tender are supported by a combined fire engine/water tender unit in overlapping fires or accidents. Numerous wildland water tenders have remotely controlled nozzles mounted on the front bumper to allow them to drive alongside a fire or smoldering area and efficiently wet it down without the crew leaving the rig. Very light water tenders are sometimes used in wildfires. For example, a small tank of 260 U.S. gallons (220 imperial gallons; 980 liters) can be carried by a cross-country vehicle to extinguish smoldering stubs on rough terrain.

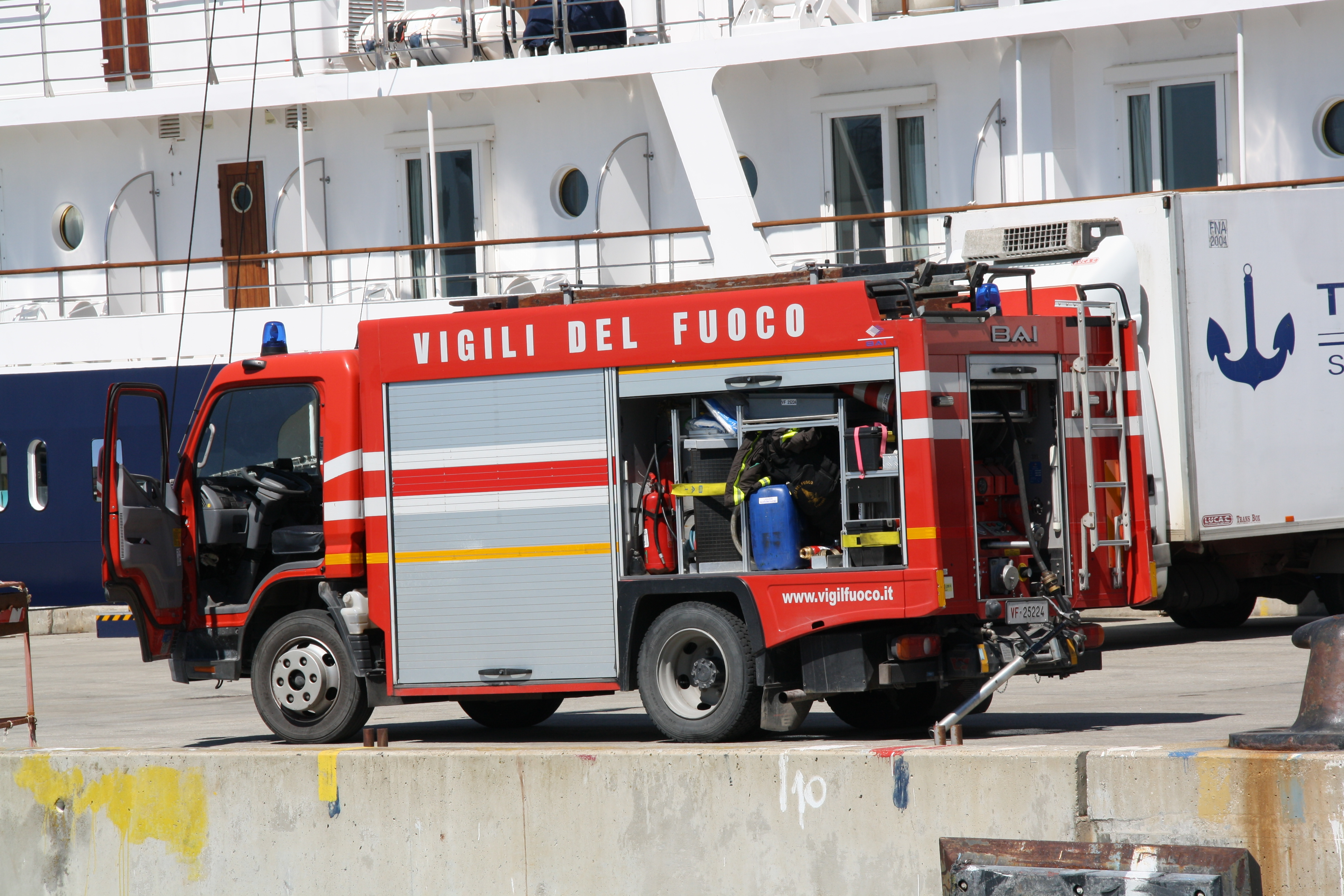
A water tender with its equipment storage used by the Vigili del Fuoco

A water tender typically carries some fire fighting equipment. There are various national standards and recommendations on equipment to be carried on water tenders. Some water tenders may carry various kinds of hoses and spray nozzles for use in forest, building, or industrial fires, as well as a portable water tank. In addition, tools like axes, flashlights, fire extinguishers, a self-contained breathing apparatus, a first aid kit, adapters, and a hydrant wrench may be required.

Some tenders carry also foaming agents, and extinguishing powders or gases. Examples of specialized water tenders include airport crash tenders and wildland water tenders.

An Australian water tender can range from a standard but modified fire engine, with a larger-than-usual capacity and off-road capability for rural fire fighting and bushfire operations (commonly called a tanker or bushfire tanker), to a water tender equipped with specialty equipment such as fixed monitors and long-throw foam nozzles (usually called a bulk water carrier or bulk water tanker). Several areas also own converted semi-trailer fuel tankers, capable of holding many thousands of liters of petrol, foam or other retardant. These are most often used in severe HazMat situations, such as oil refinery fires or fuel tanker accidents, where a large and continuous volume of water is needed.

== See also ==
- Fire command vehicle
- Rescue vehicle
- Firefighting apparatus
- Fireboat
- Portable water tank
