= Hydrant wrench =

A hydrant wrench is a tool used to remove fire hydrant caps and open the valve of the hydrant. They are usually adjustable so as to fit different sized hydrant nuts.

== In France ==
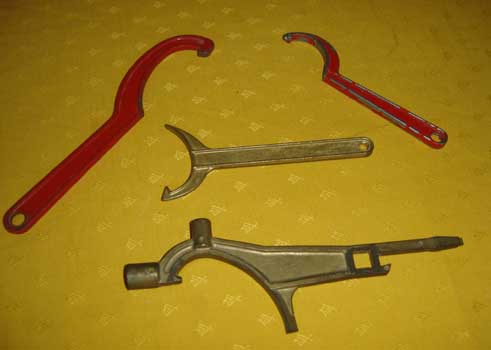
Several tricoise wrenches; the red ones at the top are in vehicles, the yellow in the middle hang at the fire belts, the bottom one is a polycoise.

In France, The wrench is called "Guillemin wrench" (French: clef Guillemin, pronounced [kle ɡijəmɛ̃]), but the firefighters call it "tricoise wrench" (clef tricoise, [kle tʁikwaz]). The curved part applies on the ring, and the hooked part clutches a notch.

Big tricoise wrenches are placed in fire trucks, and are mainly used to fasten the big hoses, e.g. ∅110 mm hoses to feed the pumper tank from the hydrant (∅100 mm for the clutch). Small tricoise are made of brass and hang at the fire belts; they are used to fasten the small hoses, e.g., ∅70mm to ∅22mm hoses (∅65mm to ∅20mm clutches).

The shape is sometimes adapted so it can be used as a tool for other purposes; it is then called "polycoise wrench" or "Deschamps wrench". These tools are used to

- Open GDF standard gas enclosures and EDF standard electrical enclosures (12mm female triangle wrench);
- Open fire hydrants (15.6mm female triangle);
- Open doors without knobs, ventilation accesses and closets containing firefighting equipment in some public locations (5×5mm to 8×8mm square female wrenches);
- Open dry risers (12.5×12.5mm square female wrench);
- Open bathroom and toilet doors (screwdriver); and
- Remove nuts and bolts (13, 17 and 19mm six-point wrenches).

== In the United States ==
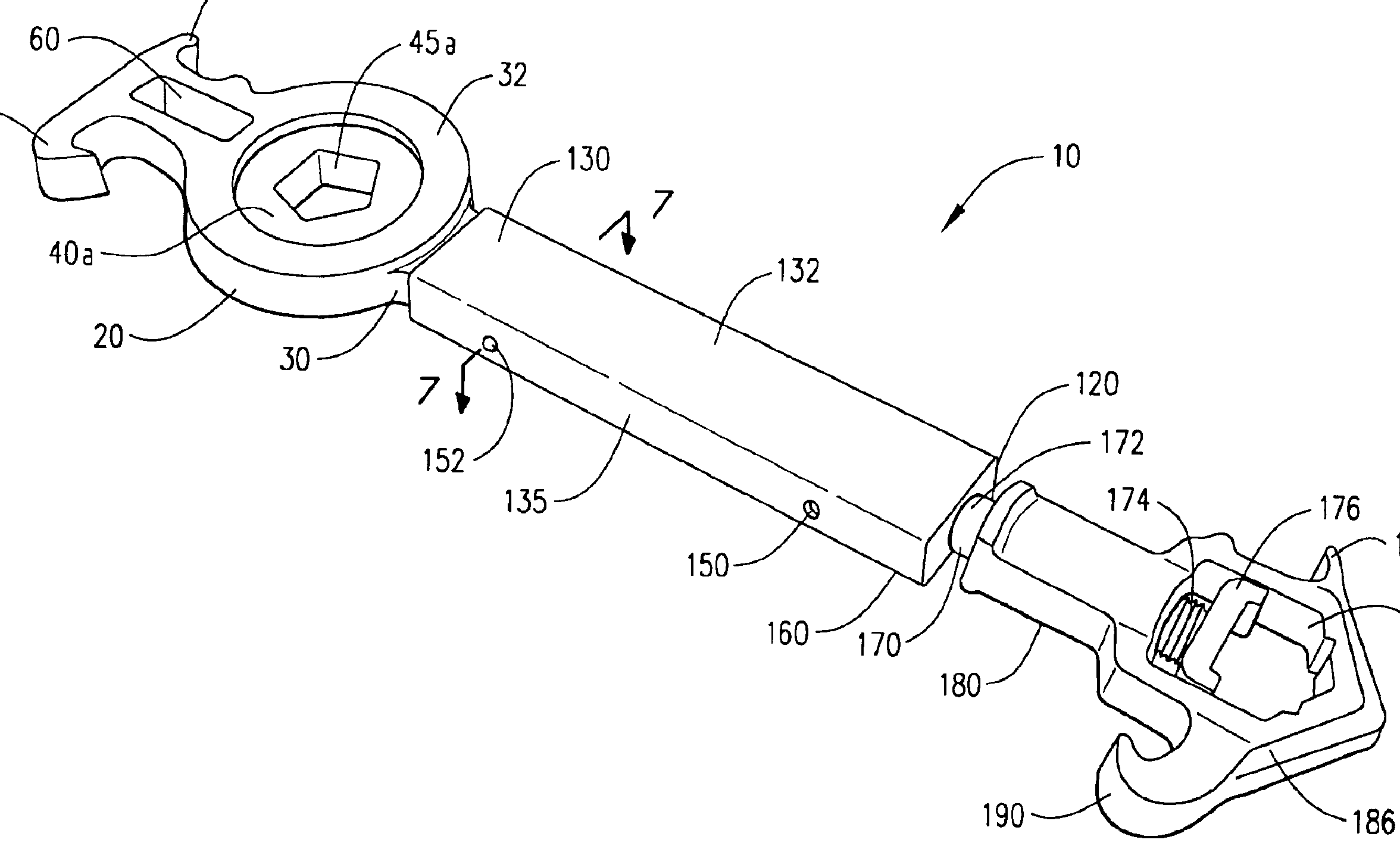
Patent drawing of a United States hydrant wrench.

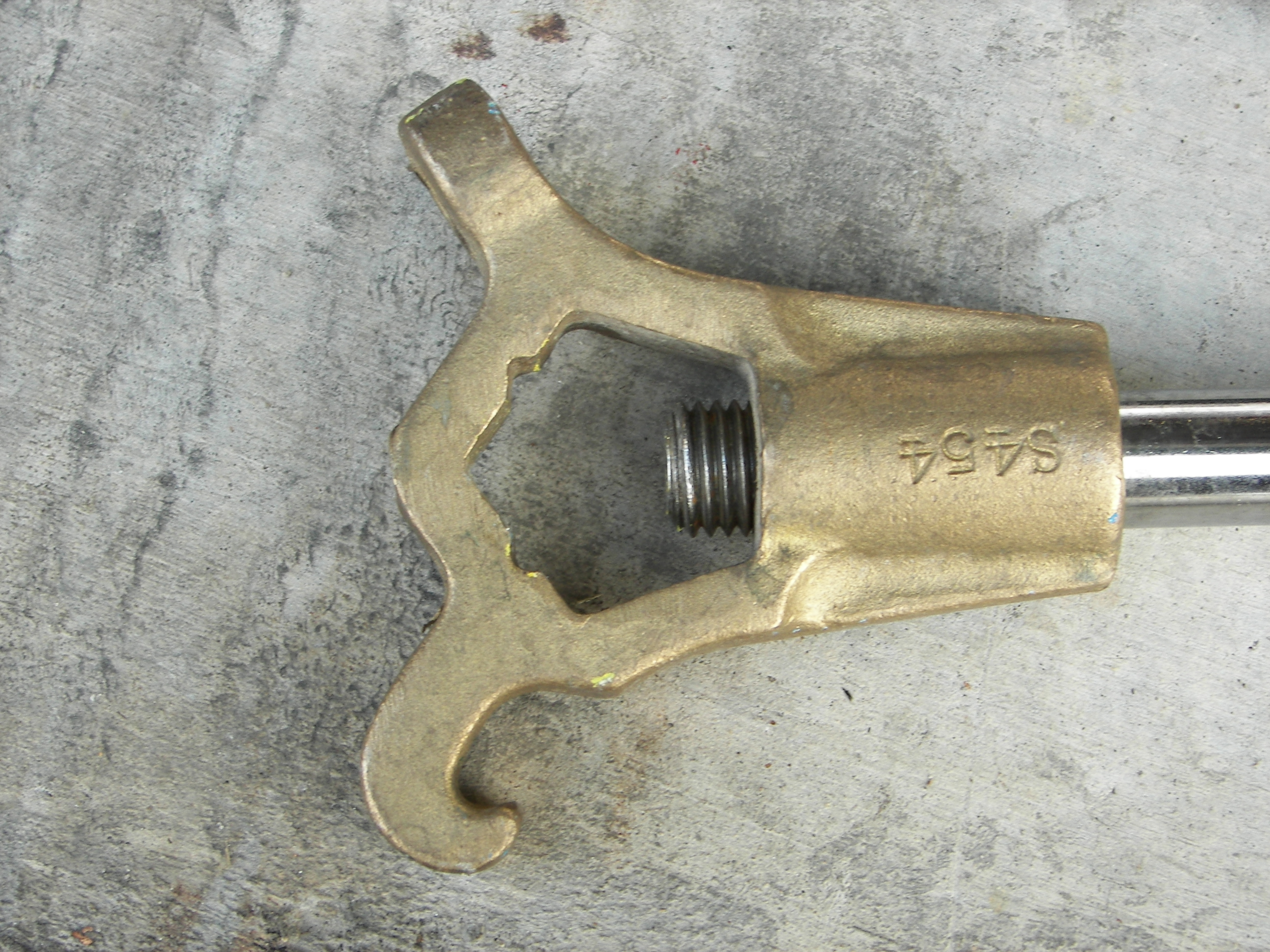
The head of a hydrant wrench.

The shape of a hydrant wrench is sometimes adapted so it can be used as a tool for other purposes, such as:

- Storz and spanner hose couplings
- Rocker lug couplings
- Water meter shutoff valves
- Gas cock valves
- Pentagonal nuts
- Square nuts.
