= The Himalayan Beacon =

Monthly magazine in India

- The first issue of The Himalayan Beacon
- Type: Monthly magazine
- Owner(s): The Mandalay Books India Pvt Ltd.
- Publisher: The Mandalay Books India Pvt Ltd.
- Editor: Barun Roy
- Founded: 1998
- Ceased publication: 2000 (print)
- Headquarters: Darjeeling, West Bengal
- Price: Indian Rupees 15 (1998) INR 8 (1999 onwards)
- Website: The Himalayan Beacon

The Himalayan Beacon, known until 2006 simply as BEACON, is a monthly news-magazine published in Darjeeling by The Mandalay Books India (Pvt.) Ltd., and distributed throughout Darjeeling Hills and Sikkim. It is now owned by The Mandalay Books India (Pvt.) Ltd., which publishes other periodicals, including the weekly newspaper This Week and The Himalayan Traveller. BEACON is the largest and the first magazine to be published by and for the Darjeeling Hills. Nicknamed the "Fire Hose" for its colourful appearance and undiplomatic journalistic style, it is often regarded as a source of record, meaning that it is frequently relied upon as the official and authoritative reference for modern events. Founded in 1998 by Barun Roy, the magazine is by far more popular among the youths of the region than the readers of other generations. The magazine's name is often abbreviated to Beacon, due to its earlier popularity as Beacon. Its famous motto, always printed in the upper left-hand corner of the cover page, is "News and Views on All for All."

== History ==
The first issue of Beacon came out on 15 January 1998. The Founding Team included:

Editor: Barun Roy

Sub-editors: Subash Sthapit (Subash Sthapit later went on to become the Finance Manager of Beacon Publications which published the Magazine)and Raju Biswas (Raju Biswas later went up to be the Advertisement Manager)

Advertisement Manager: Vikash Agarwal

Marketing Executives: Nishan Chettri and Amina Fareedi

Reporters: Prateeq Ojha, Asif Iqbal, Prashan Rai

The magazine was originally published every 15th of the Month until April 1998.

The paper's growing influence was seen during its very initial publication when in Jan-August 1998 a series of Beacon exposés targeting Bengal and the Local Administration ended the Government apathy over the retired workers of the Sidrapong Hydel Power Station.

In the later years, Beacon transitioned from supporting populistic politics to becoming a politically independent periodical. In 2000 the magazine ceased publication. In 2001, Beacon Publications went bankrupt and almost 90 per cent of the employees lost their jobs. Beacon Publications had to shut down its offices and Beacon went out of circulation for almost two years. In 2003, Beacon was acquired by "The Mandalay Books India Pvt. Ltd." In 2006 the magazine was restarted as an online magazine.

== The most controversial or historic issues of Beacon ==
The first issue of Beacon

The first in-house printed issue of Beacon

== Some of the most controversial Beacon articles ==
Beacon published numerous highly investigative and mostly controversial articles with international ramifications. While some of the articles like Problems Unsolved ultimately forced the West Bengal State Government to pay up all the payments that it had been holding for almost 25 years from the workers of the Historic Hydel Electric Project at Sidrapong, Darjeeling - articles like China’s claim on Indian Territory lead to major diplomatic scuffle between India and China which took years to heal. Ultimately, in 2003, China acknowledged Sikkim as an inalienable part of India. The "I am not seeking independence…", from the Dalai Lama in the June 1998 issue of Beacon led to a major shift in the Foreign Policy of numerous Government all over the world, including India’s.

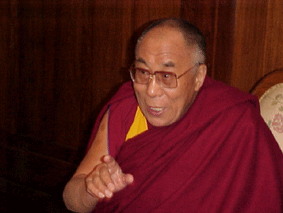
The Controversial interview of the Dalai Lama where he gave the controversial statement I am not seeking independence...

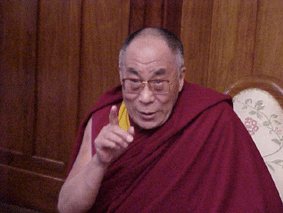
The Controversial interview of the Dalai Lama where he gave the controversial statement I am not seeking independence...

Barun Roy, the founder Editor of Beacon and Raju Biswas, the Marketing Manager of Beacon. Biswas later left Beacon after Beacon's grassroots journalism attracted huge political pressure and manipulation.
