= Portable water tank =

Portable temporary water container

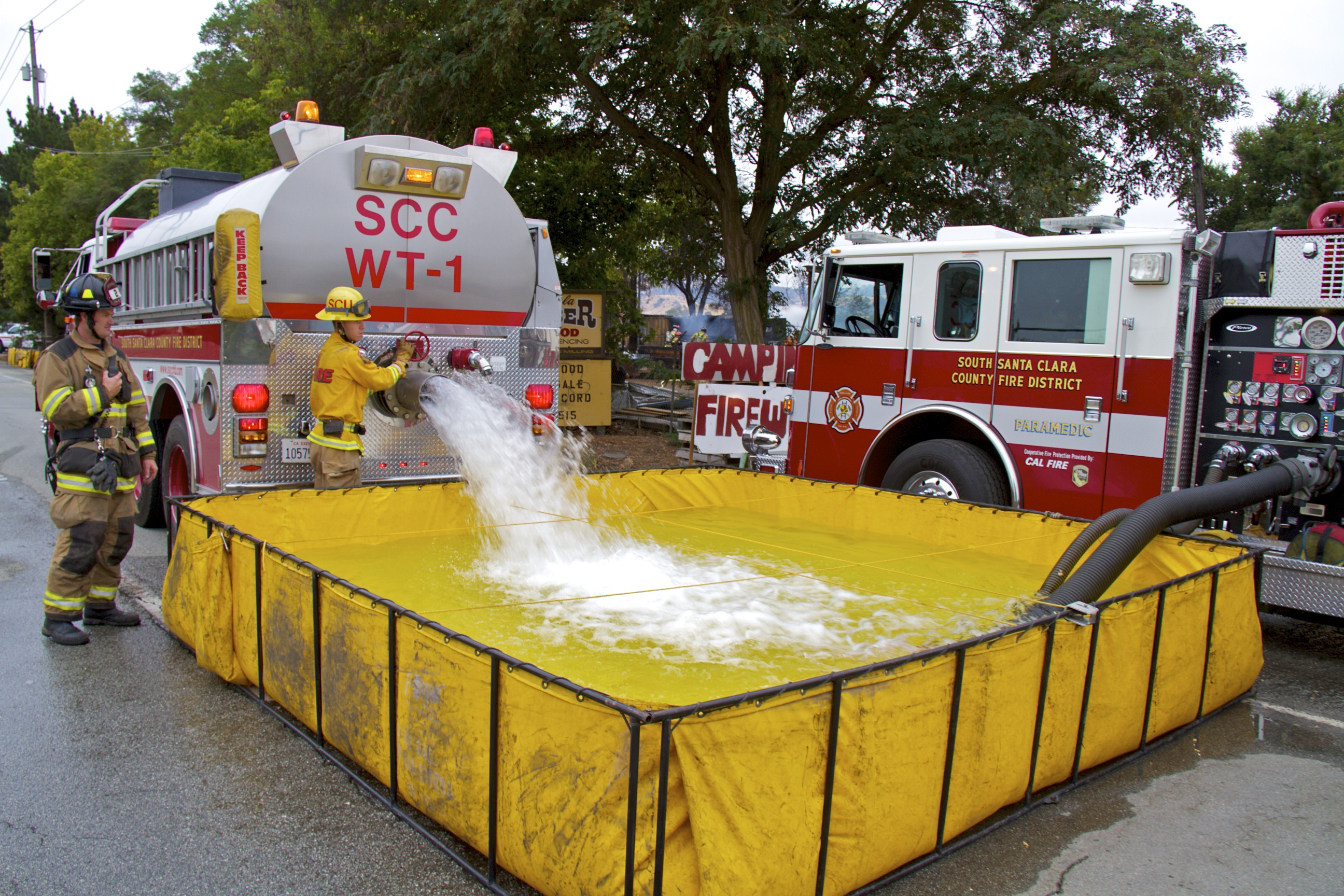
Fire Department using a Portable Water Tank in South San Jose

A portable water tank is a temporary collapsible tank designed for the reserve storage of water in firefighting, emergency relief, and military applications. These tanks can be either supported or unsupported. The supported tanks have a steel or aluminum frame and range in size from 600 to 5,000 US gallons (500 to 4,160 imp gal; 2,300 to 18,900 L) or larger by custom design. Portable water tanks are also unsupported such as self-supporting tanks (onion tanks), blivets and pillow or bladder tanks and are available in sizes ranging from 100 US gallons (83 imp gal; 380 L) up to 80,000 US gallons (67,000 imp gal; 300,000 L).

== Usage/deployment ==
It is primarily used in rural areas where fire hydrants are not available. They are carried on water tenders and are deployed at the scene of a fire during a shuttle operation. A portable water tank is usually set up near or front of an attack engine, or possibly next to a supply engine. This enables tenders to quickly drop off their load of water and return to the fill site as soon as possible. They are designed to be set up in around a half-minute with two firefighters. The engine may then use suction hose to draft water from the tank.

== See also ==
- Glossary of firefighting equipment
- Water tank
