= Draft (water) =

Moving water by vacuum

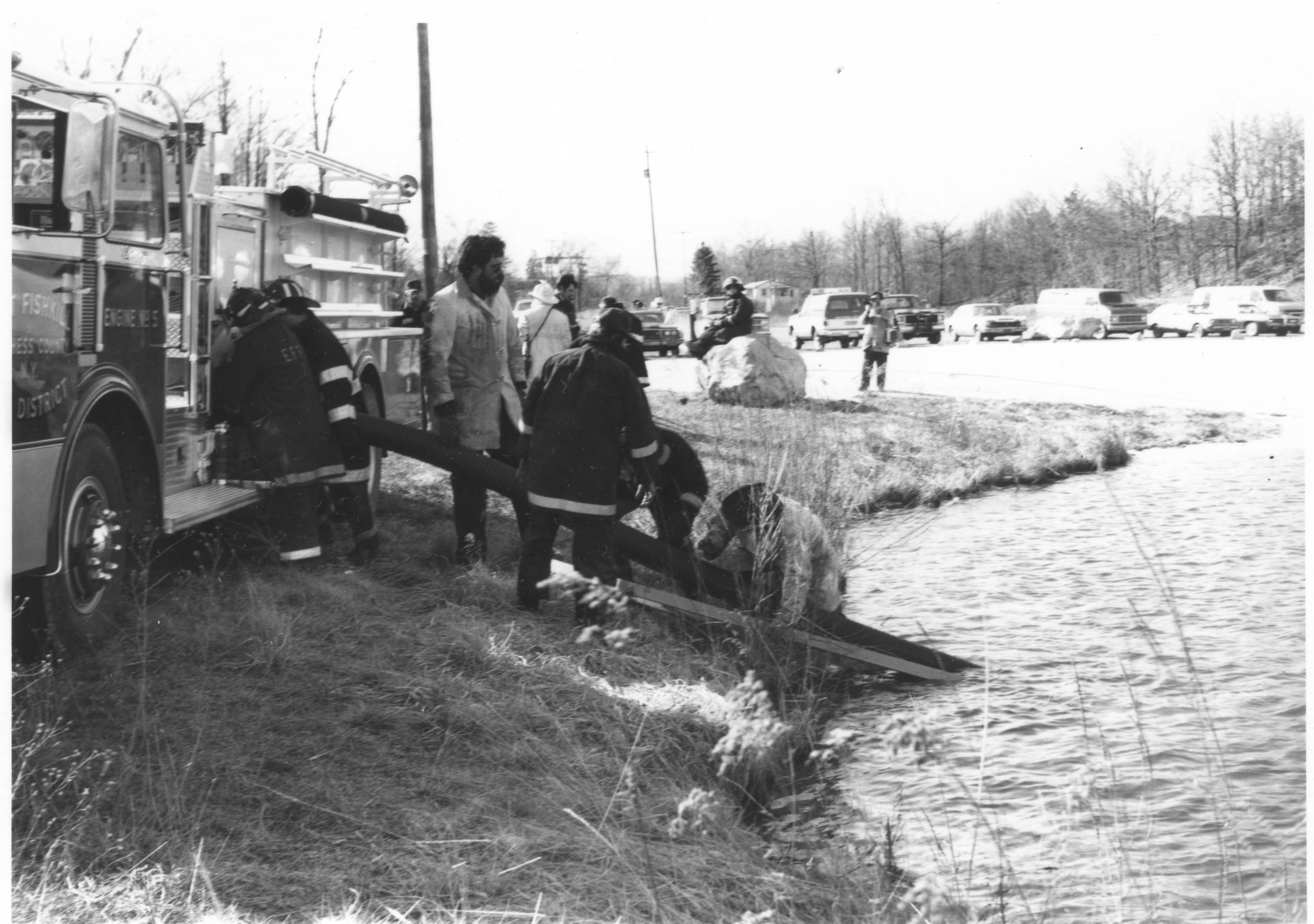
Fire engine drafting

A draft is the use of suction to move a liquid such as water from a vessel or body of water below the intake of a suction pump. A rural fire department or farmer might draft water from a pond as the first step in moving the water elsewhere. A suction pump creates a partial vacuum (a "draft") and the atmospheric pressure on the water's surface forces the water into the pump, usually via a rigid pipe (sometimes called a dry hydrant) or a semi-rigid suction hose.

Standard atmospheric pressure is 101 kPa (14.7 lbf/in^{2}) and that can only raise water to a theoretical maximum of 10.3 metres (34 feet). Depending on application, fire department pumps lift water 6 to 10 metres (20 to 33 ft).

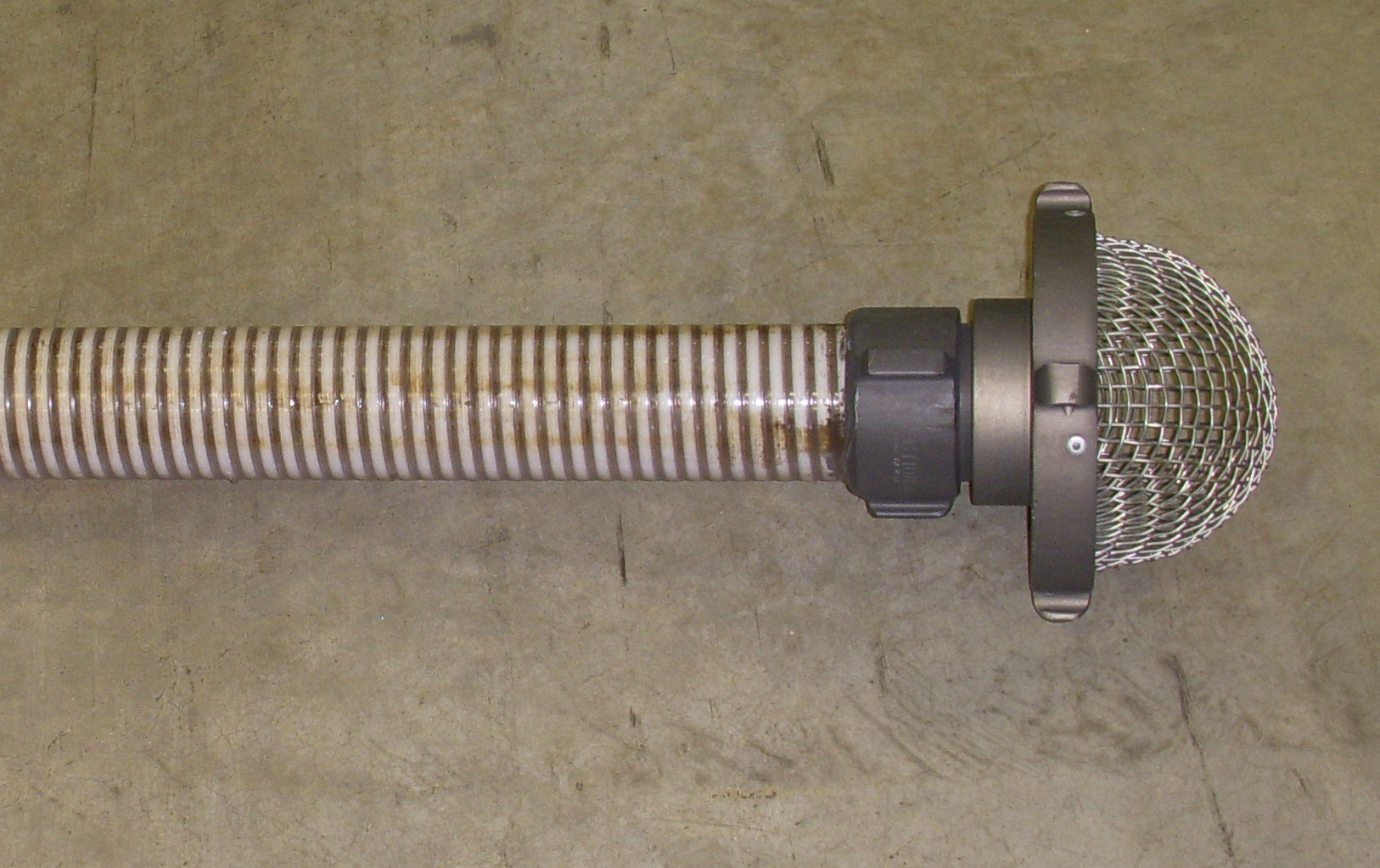
Medium diameter hard suction hose, with attached strainer, for use with wildland firefighting apparatus.

To reduce drafting friction and obtain a larger flow or higher lift, a larger cross-section of suction hose is employed. For example, using a five-inch (127 mm) hose, a pump that could lift 500 US gallons per minute (30 L/s) up 23 feet (7.0 m) would only be able to lift the same amount of water 12.5 feet (3.8 m) through a 3.5-inch (89 mm) hose. Fire engines are often seen carrying two or three 10-foot (3.0 m) lengths of suction hose, but the longer the lift, the lower the flow, for a fixed-diameter suction hose and a given pump. Multiple relays could be used if the need arises, with a suction pump drafting up to 10 metres (33 feet) and discharging at great distances.

It is also possible to use a gravity siphon to draft water for a small lift, and this technique is often used in forest fire suppression, where portable reservoirs of 1,000 to 3,000 US gallons (5 to 10 m^{3}) are filled with water and small hoses are used downhill of the tanks. The nozzle pressure is proportional to its distance below the reservoir surface. 100 ft height change yields approximately 43 psi. The tank may itself be gravity-fed through hoses from a nearby water source, or by pumps or helicopters delivering water from further away.

== See also ==
- Portable water tank
