= Storz =

Hose coupling

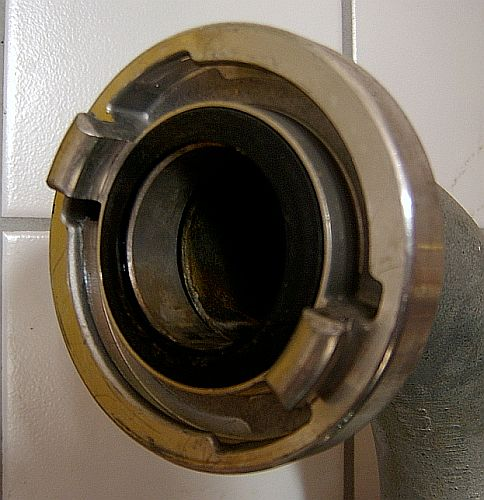
Storz connector

Storz is a type of hose coupling invented by Carl August Guido Storz in 1882, patented in Switzerland in 1890 and in the U.S. in 1893 that connects using interlocking hooks and flanges. It was first specified in standard FEN 301-316, and has been used by German fire brigades since 1933. (See German delivery hose article.) Amongst other uses, it has been widely employed on fire hoses in firefighting applications. It is the standard coupling on fire hoses in Portugal, Denmark, Slovenia, Germany, Austria, Switzerland, Sweden, the Netherlands, Poland, Czechia, Israel, Croatia, Serbia, Bosnia and Herzegovina, Macedonia, Montenegro and Greece. It is also one of the standard couplings on fire hoses in Australia and the United States.

The Storz coupling system is also widely used for filling of bulk wood pellet storage systems in Europe (Storz-A or 4-inch or 10-centimetre size), although in France and Belgium the similar but not completely symmetric Guillemin coupling is more commonly employed.

Storz connectors are usually made of brass or aluminium. They can be manufactured by casting for general hose connection and low pressure applications, but for firefighting, it is better to use forgings to guarantee the safety and durability of the coupling.

It is sometimes referred to as a sexless coupling, because rather than having a male and a female end connected by screw threads, either identical end can be joined to any other end of the same diameter. This is also called hermaphroditic or two-way connection. To couple a Storz connection, the two opposing couplings are pressed together such that the hooks of each one are inserted into the slots in the flange of the other. Then they are rotated in opposite directions until they are tight. This creates a watertight connection between the internal packing gaskets. To uncouple them, the connectors are turned in the opposite directions from coupling, and then separated when the hooks and slots are aligned. Special wrenches are designed for assisting with use of Storz connectors.

The main benefit to using Storz couplings is speed of hose connection, as a hose can be locked with a quarter-turn. By comparison, locking hoses using threaded couplings often takes several turns. Because of this, Storz couplings are widely viewed as a safer alternative to using threaded couplings. A secondary benefit over threaded couplings is that the connecting faces and hooks are less prone to damage if the coupling is dropped onto, or dragged over, a hard surface. As the hooks are inside the housing, they are less prone to damage or catching onto obstacles.

Storz couplers are available commercially in the following non-DIN-specified sizes:

| Storz size | Lug diameter, inner face (mm) | Hose diameter, internal (mm) | Standard | Fire-fighting usage |
|---|---|---|---|---|
| 25 | 37 | 25 | AS2419.4 | Australia |
| 32 | 44 | 32 | | |
| 38 | 52 | 38 | CAN-ULC-S543, AS2419.4 | Australia |
| 45 | 59 | 45 | | |
| 65 | 81 | 38, 42, 52, 64, 70 | CAN-ULC-S543, AS2419.4 | Australia |
| 75 | 89 | 65, 75 | AS2419.4 | |
| 90 | 105 | 90 | AS2419.4 | Australia (legacy only) |
| 100 | 115 | 101 (called 4″ in U.S.) | CAN-ULC-S543, NFPA1963, AS2419.4 | U.S., Australia |
| 125 | 148 | 125 (called 5″ in U.S.) | CAN-ULC-S543, NFPA1963, AS2419.4 | U.S., Australia |
| 135 | 159 | 135 | | |
| 150 3-lug | 160 | 150 | CAN-ULC-S543, AS2419.4 | Australia |
| 165 | 188 | 165 | | |
| 205 2-lug | 220 | 203 | | |
| 205 3-lug | 220 | 203 | | |
| 250 3-lug | 278 | 256 | | |

DIN standards define the following pressure couplings:

| Storz size | Seal diameter, inner (mm) | Lug diameter, inner face (mm) | DIN standard | Hose diameter, internal (mm) | Fire-fighting usage |
|---|---|---|---|---|---|
| D | 25 | 31 | 14301 | 25 | Germany |
| S28 | 52 | 66 | 14330-2 | 28 | Germany |
| S32 | 52 | 66 | 14330-1 | 32 | Germany |
| C42 | 52 | 66 | 14332 | 42 | Germany |
| C52 | 52 | 66 | 14302 | 52 | Germany |
| B | 75 | 89 | 14303 | 75 | Germany |
| A | 110 | 133 | 14300 | 110 | |

DIN standards define the following suction couplings:

| Storz size | Seal diameter, inner (mm) | Lug diameter, inner face (mm) | DIN standard | Hose diameter, internal (mm) | Fire-fighting usage |
|---|---|---|---|---|---|
| D | 25 | 31 | 14301 | 15, 19, 25 | |
| C | 52 | 66 | 14321 | 19, 25, 32, 38, 42, 45, 52, 64 | |
| B | 75 | 89 | 14322 | 52, 65, 70, 75 | |
| A | 110 | 133 | 14323 | 102, 110 | Germany |

DIN standards define the following fixed couplings (for securing fittings to hoses):

| Storz size | Seal diameter, inner (mm) | Lug diameter, inner face (mm) | Sealing method | DIN standard | Fire-fighting usage |
|---|---|---|---|---|---|
| D | 25 | 31 | Rubber gasket | 14306 | |
| C | 52 | 66 | Rubber gasket | 14307 | |
| C | 52 | 66 | Integral metal seat | 14317 | |
| B | 75 | 89 | Rubber seal | 14308 | |
| B | 75 | 89 | Integral metal seat | 14318 | |
| A | 110 | 133 | Rubber gasket | 14309 | |
| A | 110 | 133 | Integral metal seat | 14319 | |

DIN standards define the following threaded adapters:

| Storz size | Seal diameter, inner (mm) | Lug diameter, inner face (mm) | Thread | DIN standard |
|---|---|---|---|---|
| D | 25 | 31 | BSP 1″ | 14306 |
| C | 52 | 66 | BSP 2″ | 14307 |
| B | 75 | 89 | BSP 2 1/2″ | 14308 |
| A | 110 | 133 | BSP 4 1/2″ | 14309 |

DIN standards define the following caps:

| Storz size | Seal diameter, inner (mm) | Lug diameter, inner face (mm) | DIN standard |
|---|---|---|---|
| D | 25 | 31 | 14310 |
| C | 52 | 66 | 14311 |
| B | 75 | 89 | 14312 |
| A | 110 | 133 | 14313 |

DIN standards define the following swivel reducers:

| Induced | | | Reduced | | | DIN standard |
| Storz size | Seal diameter, inner (mm) | Lug diameter, inner face (mm) | Storz size | Seal diameter, inner (mm) | Lug diameter, inner face (mm) | DIN standard |
|---|---|---|---|---|---|---|
| C | 52 | 66 | D | 25 | 31 | 14341 |
| B | 75 | 89 | C | 52 | 66 | 14342 |
| A | 110 | 133 | B | 75 | 89 | 14343 |

== United States usage ==
Storz rapidly became a standard for fire hydrants throughout much of Europe, but it took nearly one hundred years before the main larger "steamer ports" on fire hydrants started to be converted to the Storz coupling in the United States. U.S. fire engines typically carry LDH (large diameter hose) with Storz couplings on both ends for connections between fire hydrants and pumps. However, if a hydrant usually has threaded couplings, an adapter is required to use with Storz. All major U.S. hydrant manufacturers now offer Storz couplings as original equipment on their hydrants, to connect with the Storz couplings used by firefighters. Hydrants may also be retro-fitted from thread to Storz to aid interoperability between firefighting organizations.

The 100 mm (4-inch) and 125 mm (5-inch) Storz couplers have been specified in NFPA 1963, Standard for Fire Hose Connections, since the 1993 edition.

U.S. cities that have fire hydrants with 125 mm Storz connectors include Raleigh, NC and the City of Corvallis, OR (adapter on 4-inch threaded outlet).

The 150 mm (6-inch) size is occasionally used for PVC suction hose, in place of the industry-standard 6 NH threads.

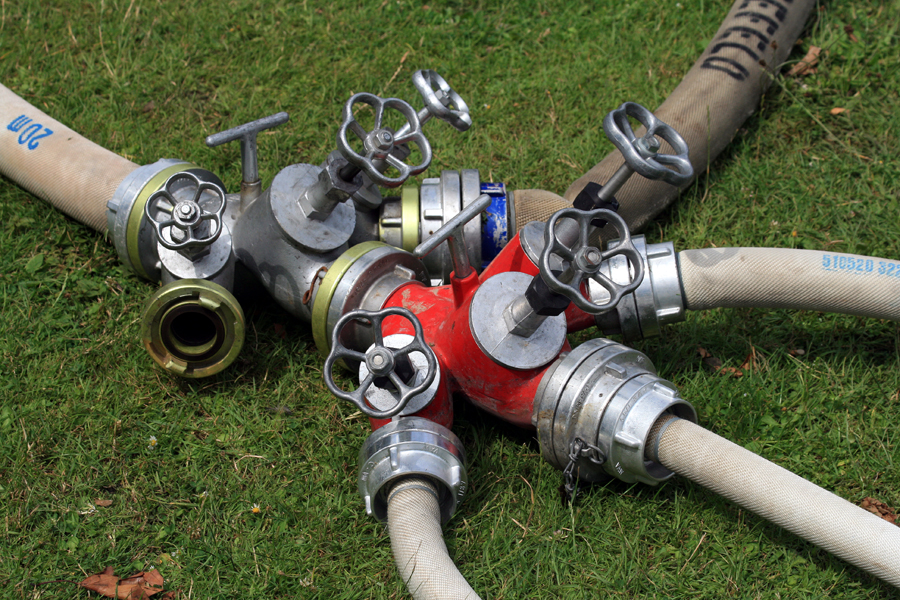
Two 3-way splitters with Storz connectors.

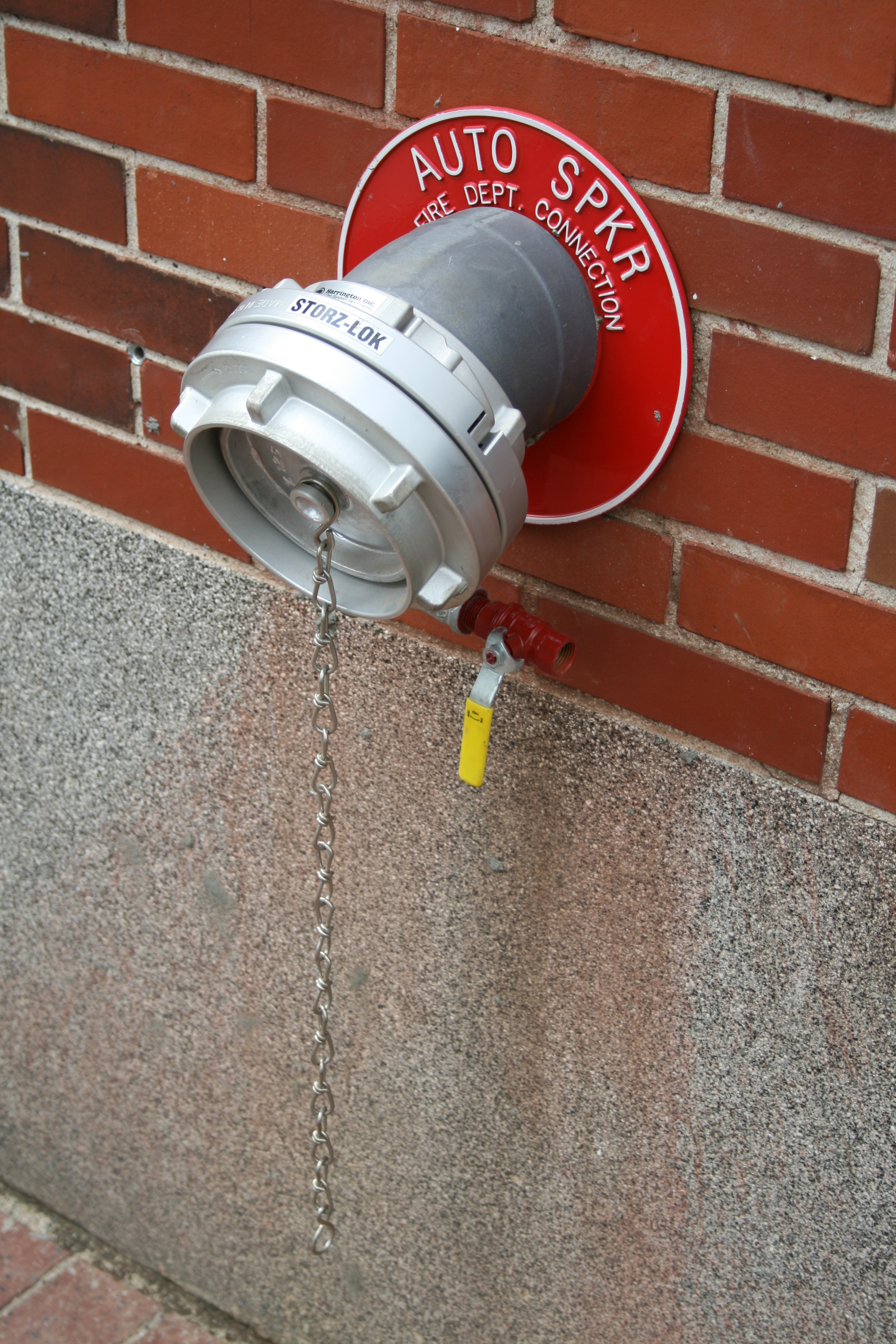
Building dry riser fire hose connection

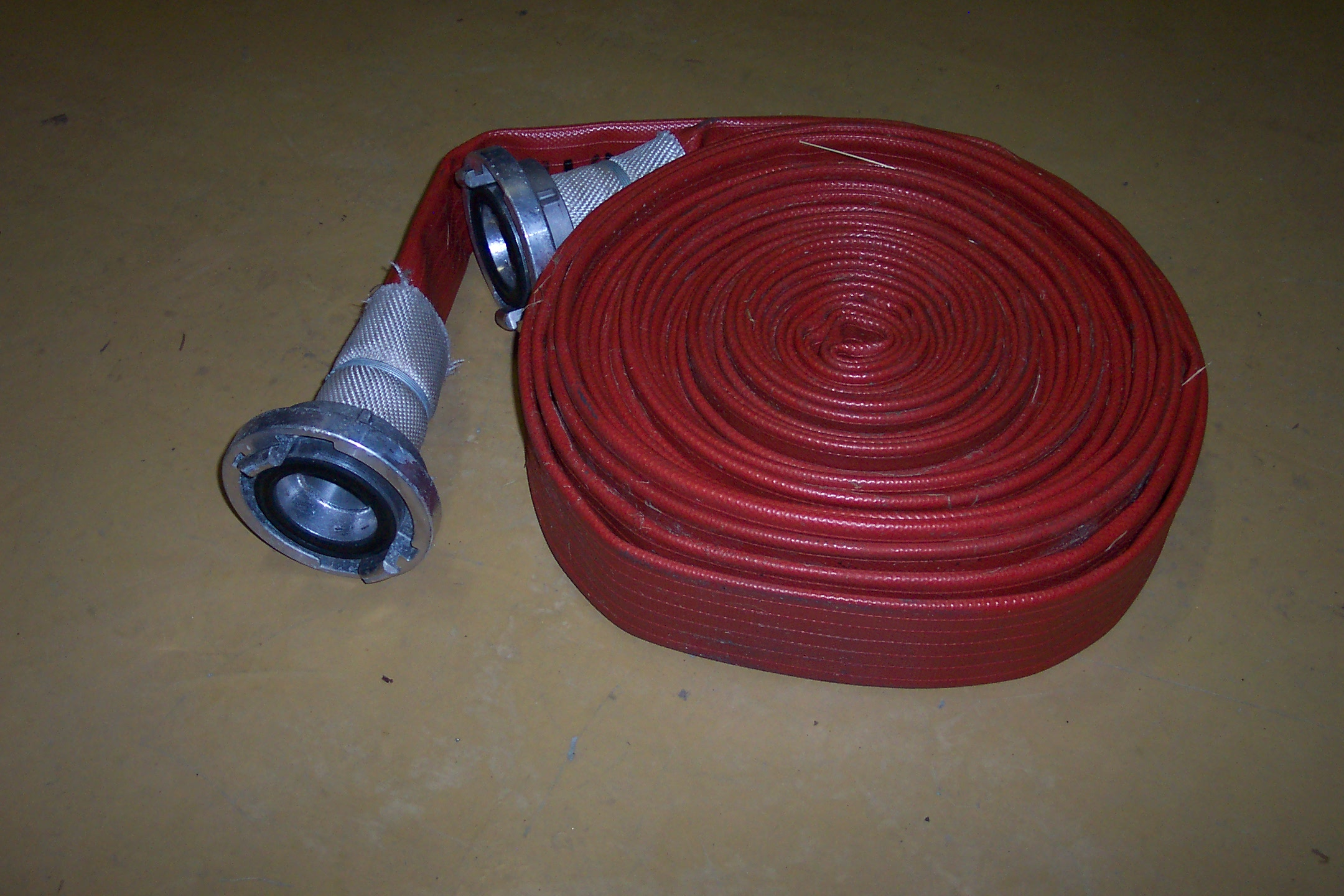
75 mm fire hose with Storz couplings

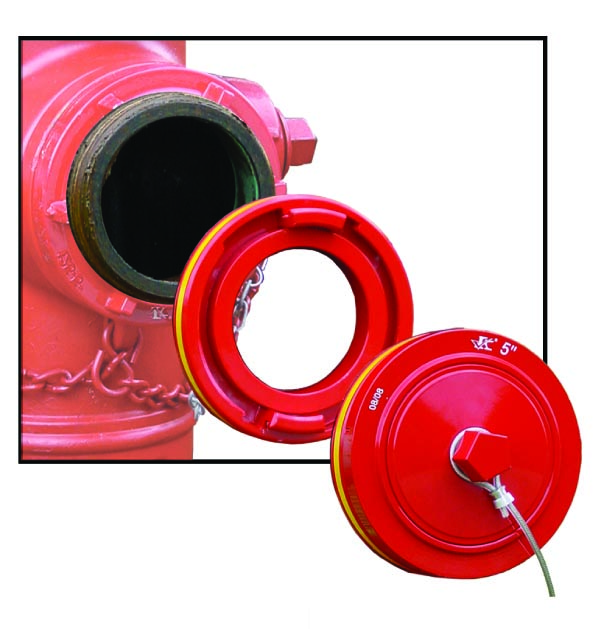
Threaded to Storz adapter for fire hydrants.

== See also ==
- Bayonet mount
- Hose coupling
