= Fire hose =

Flexible tube used for delivering water or foam at high pressure, to fight fires

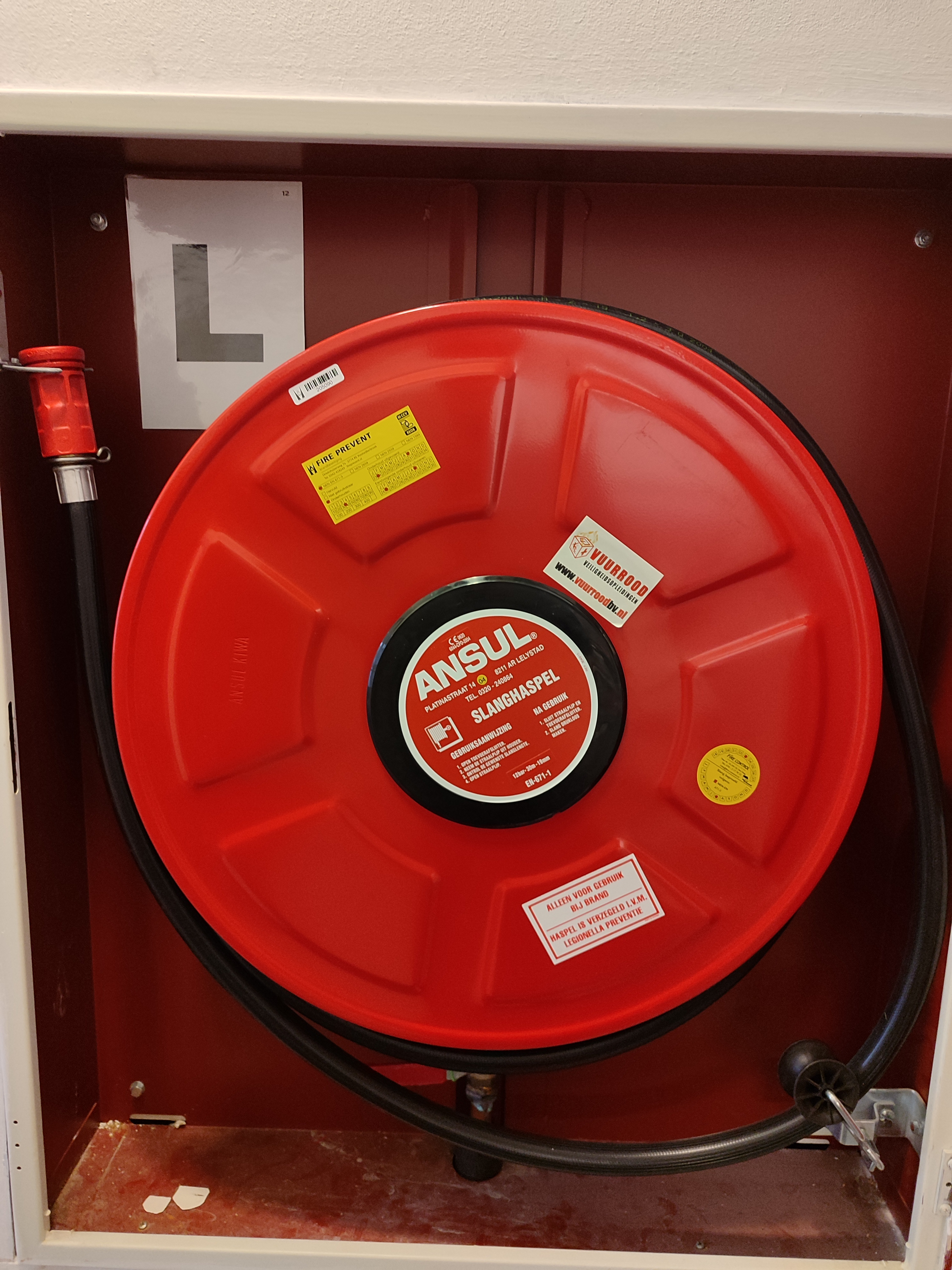
Firehose

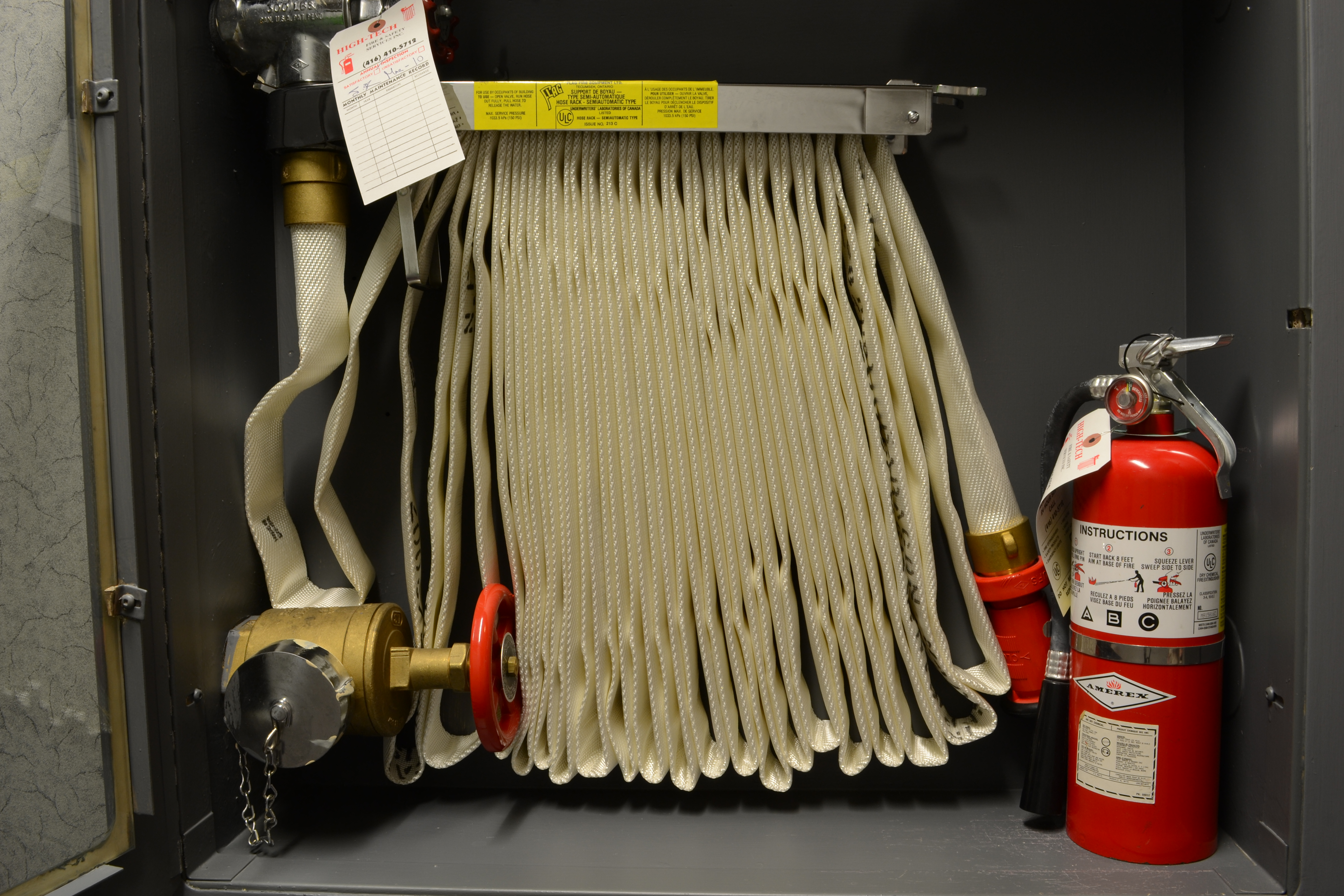
Indoor fire hose with a fire extinguisher

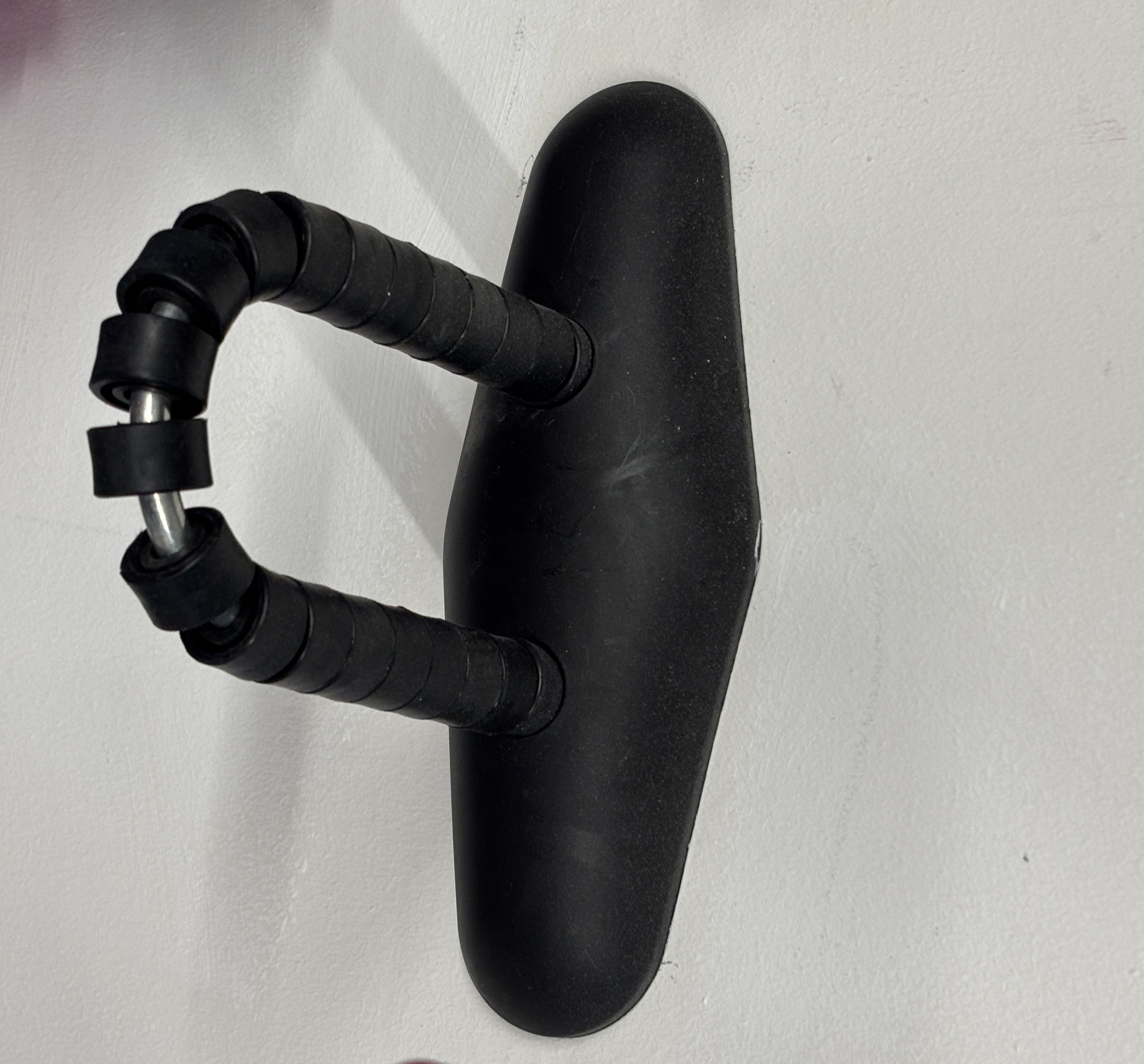
Hose guides can be used to make it easier to drag fire hoses around corners

A fire hose (or firehose) is a high-pressure hose that carries water or other fire retardant (such as foam) to a fire to extinguish it. Outdoors, it attaches either to a fire engine, fire hydrant, or a portable fire pump. Indoors, it can permanently attach to a building's standpipe or plumbing system.

The usual working pressure of a firehose can vary between 8 and 20 bar (800 and 2,000 kPa; 116 and 290 psi) while per the NFPA 1961 Fire Hose Standard, its bursting pressure is in excess of 110 bars (11,000 kPa; 1,600 psi). Hose is one of the basic, essential pieces of fire-fighting equipment. It is necessary to convey water either from an open water supply, or pressurized water supply. Hoses are divided into two categories, based on their use: suction hose, and delivery hose.

After use, a fire hose is usually hung to dry, because standing water that remains in a hose for a long time can deteriorate the material and render it unreliable or unusable. Therefore, the typical fire station often has a high structure to accommodate the length of a hose for such preventive maintenance, known as a hose tower.

On occasions, fire hoses have been used for crowd control (see also water cannon), including by Bull Connor in the Birmingham campaign against protesters during the Civil Rights Movement in 1963.

== History ==
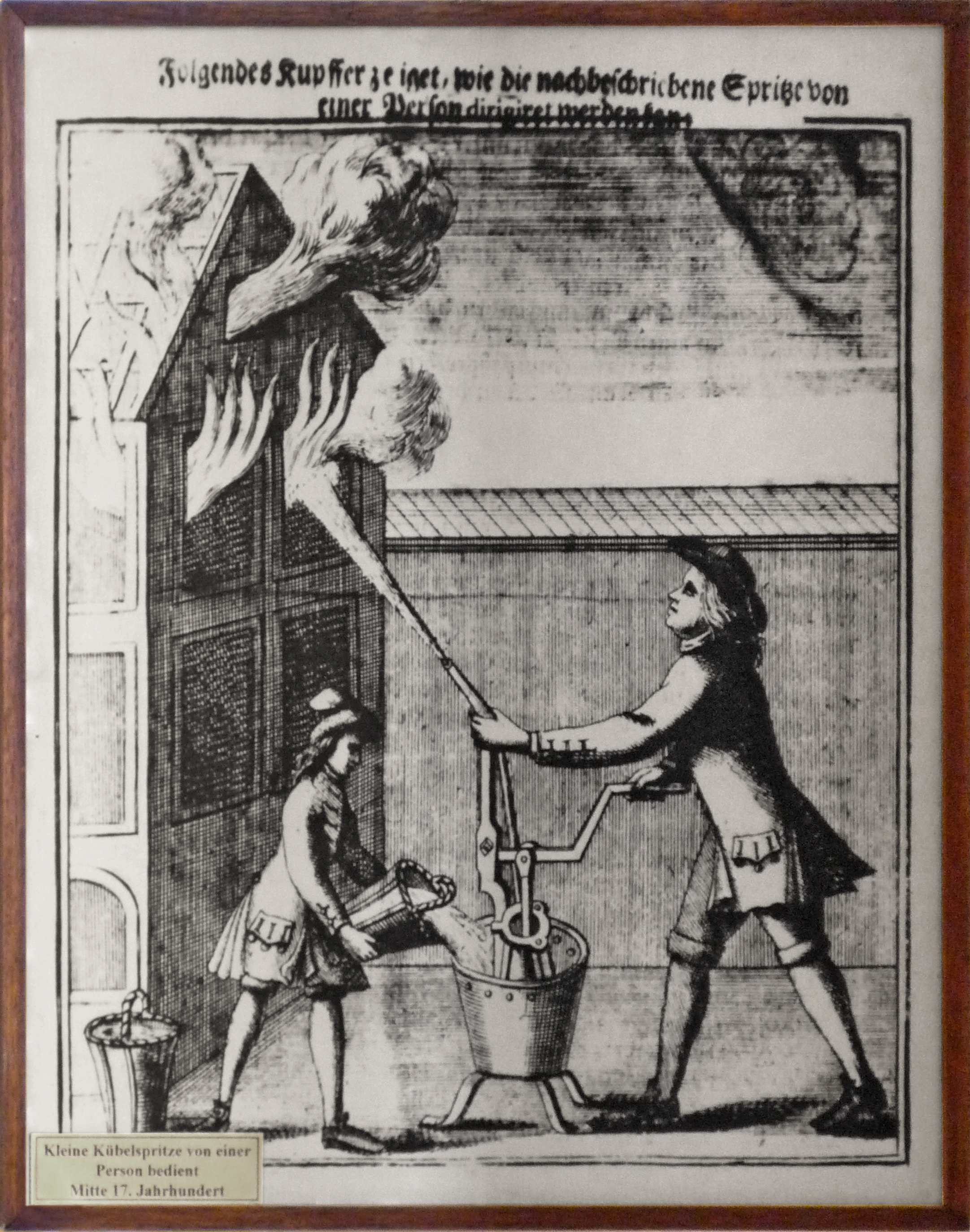
A stirrup pump from the mid-17th century, before the advent of fire hoses

Until the mid-19th century, most fires were fought by water transported to the scene in buckets. Original hand pumpers discharged their water through a small pipe or monitor attached to the top of the pump tub. It was not until the late 1860s that hoses became widely available to convey water more easily from the hand pumps, and later steam pumpers, to the fire.

In Amsterdam in the Dutch Republic, the Superintendent of the Fire Brigade, Jan van der Heyden, and his son Nicholaas took firefighting to its next step with the fashioning of the first fire hose in 1673. These 50-foot (15 m) lengths of leather were sewn together like a boot leg. Even with the limitations of pressure, the attachment of the hose to the gooseneck nozzle allowed closer approaches and more accurate water application. Van der Heyden was also credited with an early version of a suction hose using wire to keep it rigid. In the United States, the fire hose was introduced in Philadelphia in 1794. This canvas hose proved insufficiently durable, and sewn leather hose was then used. The sewn leather hose tended to burst, so a hose fabricated of leather fastened together with copper rivets and washers was invented by members of Philadelphia's Humane Hose Company.

Around 1890, unlined fire hoses made of circular woven linen yarns began to replace leather hoses. They were certainly much lighter. As the hose fibers, made of flax, became wet, they swelled up and tightened the weave, causing the hose to become watertight. Unlined hoses, because of their lack of durability, were rapidly replaced with rubber hoses in municipal fire service use. They continued to be used on interior hose lines and hose rack until the 1960s to 1980s. In January 1981, the Occupational Safety and Health Administration revised their standards such that unlined hoses were to no longer be installed for interior hose lines.

Following the invention of the vulcanization process as a means of curing raw soft rubber into a harder, more useful product, the fire service slowly made the transition from bulky and unreliable leather hose to the unlined linen hose, then to a multi-layer, rubber lined and coated hose with interior fabric reinforcement. This rubber hose was as bulky, heavy, and stiff as a leather hose, but was not prone to leaking. It also proved more durable than unlined linen hose. Its wrapped construction resembled some hoses used today by industry, for example, fuel delivery hoses used to service airliners.

== Modern usage ==
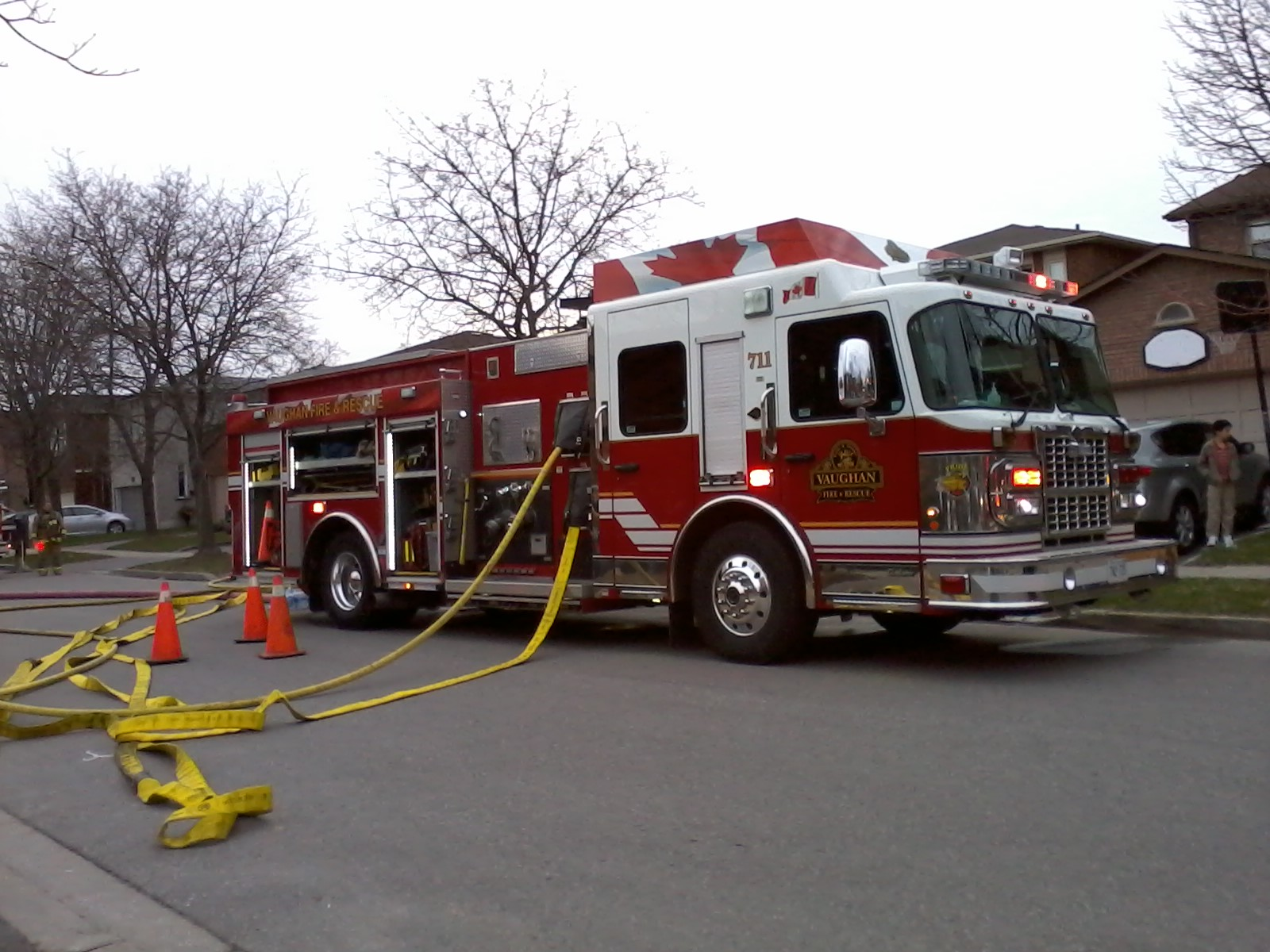
Fire hoses connected to a fire engine in Vaughan, Ontario

Tokyo Fire Department conducting a fire hose drill

Modern fire hoses use a variety of natural and synthetic fabrics and elastomers in their construction. These materials allow the hoses to be stored wet without rotting and to resist the damaging effects of exposure to sunlight and chemicals. Modern hoses are lighter weight than older designs, which has reduced the physical strain on firefighters. Various devices are becoming more prevalent to remove air from the interior of fire hose, commonly referred to as fire hose vacuums. This makes hoses smaller and somewhat rigid, allowing more hose to be packed into the same compartment on a fire-fighting apparatus.

Suction Hose

Suction hose is laid down on the suction side of pump (inlet) where the water passing through it is at a pressure either below or above that of the atmosphere. It is designed to resist internal and external pressure. It should have sufficient strength to withstand the pressure of external air when a vacuum has formed inside. It should also be strong enough to resist hydrant pressure. Usually an appliance has to carry about 10 m (33 ft) of suction hose in either 3 or 2.5 m (9.8 or 8.2 ft) length. The diameter of the hose depends on the capacity of the pump, and three standard sizes such as 75, 100, 140 mm (3.0, 3.9, 5.5 in) are generally used.

Partially Embedded suction hose

Partially Embedded suction hose is usually made of a tough rubber lining embedded fully as a spiral, with tempered, galvanized steel wire. This embedding is arranged so that it provides a full waterway and a relatively smooth internal surface. The wall of the hose is prepared from several layers of canvas and rubber lining so that turns of each one lie midway between turns of the other. The complete wall is consolidated by vulcanizing.

Fully embedded (smooth bore) suction hose

Fully embedded (smooth bore) suction hose has a thick, internal rubber lining embedded fully with a spiral of wire. Suction hoses should be able to withstand a pressure of 10.5 bar (152 psi; 1,050 kPa).

Delivery Hose

Delivery hose is laid down from the delivery side of the pump (outlet), and the water passing through it is always at a pressure greater than that of the atmosphere. Delivery hose is divided into two categories: percolating hose, and non-percolating hose.

Percolating hose Percolating hose is used mainly to fight forest fires. The seepage of water through the hose protects the hose against damage by glowing embers falling onto it or the hose being laid on hot ground.

Non-percolating hose In fire services, non-percolating hoses are generally used for delivering water. Non-percolating hose consists of a reinforced jacket made from polyester or nylon yarns. This type of hose has an inner lining of vulcanized rubber fixed to the jacket by an adhesive. The use of non-percolating hose is recommended in certain applications, as friction losses will be much less than that of percolating hoses.

Lined hose are divided into 3 types:

Type 1: Lined hose without external jacket treatment: Such hose absorbs liquid into reinforcement jacket and requires drying after use.

Type 2: Coated lined hose: This has a thin, elastic outer coating that reduces liquid absorption into the jacket and may slightly improve abrasion resistance.

Type 3: Covered lined hose: Covered lined hose has a thicker elastic cover that prevents liquid absorption but also adds substantial improvements to abrasion and heat resistance.

=== Types ===
There are several types of hose designed specifically for the fire service. Those designed to operate under positive pressure are called discharge hoses; they include: attack hose, supply hose, relay hose, forestry hose, and booster hose. Those designed to operate under negative pressure are called suction hoses.

Name	Definition
Attack	Attack hose is a fabric-covered, flexible hose used to bring water from the fire pumper to the nozzle. This hose ranges in nominal inside diameter from 1.5 to 3 in (38 to 76 mm) and is designed to operate at pressures up to about 400 psi (2,760 kPa). The standard length is 50 ft (15.24 m).
Supply and relay hoses	Supply and relay hoses are large-diameter, fabric-covered, flexible hoses used to bring water from a distant hydrant to the fire pumper, or to relay water from one pumper to another over a long distance. These hoses range in nominal inside diameter from 3.5 to 5.0 in (89 to 127 mm). They are designed to operate at pressures up to about 300 psi (2,070 kPa) for the smaller diameters and up to 200 psi (1,380 kPa) for the larger diameters. The standard length is 100 ft (30.48 m).
Forestry hose	Forestry hose is a fabric-covered, flexible hose used to fight fires in grass, brush, and trees where a lightweight hose is needed to maneuver it over steep or rough terrain. Forestry hose comes in 1.0 and 1.5 in (25 and 38 mm) nominal inside diameters and is designed to operate at pressures up to about 450 psi (3,100 kPa). The standard length is 100 ft (30.48 m).
Booster hose	Booster hose is a rubber-covered, thick-walled, flexible hose used to fight small fires. It retains its round cross-section when it is not under pressure and is usually carried on a reel on the fire pumper, rather than being stored flat. Booster hose comes in 0.75 and 1.0 in (19 and 25 mm) nominal inside diameters and is designed to operate at pressures up to 800 psi (5,520 kPa). The standard length is 100 ft (30.48 m).
Suction hose	Suction hose, sometimes called hard-suction hose, is usually a rubber-covered, semi-rigid hose with internal, metal reinforcements. It is used to suck water out of unpressurized sources such as ponds, rivers, or swimming pools for home wildfire protection purposes. Hard-suction hose comprises multiple layers of rubber and woven fabric encapsulating an internal helix of steel wire. Some very flexible hard-suction hoses use a thin, polyvinyl chloride cover with a polyvinyl chloride plastic helix. Suction hose ranges in nominal inside diameter from 2.5 to 6.0 in (64 to 152 mm). The standard length is 10 ft (3.05 m).

Another suction hose, called a soft-suction hose, is actually a short length of fabric-covered, flexible discharge hose used to connect the fire pumper suction inlet with a pressurized hydrant. It is not a true suction hose, since it cannot withstand negative pressure.

=== Raw materials ===
In the past, cotton was the most common fiber used in fire hoses, but most modern hoses use synthetic fiber like polyester or nylon filament. The synthetic fibers provide additional strength and better resistance to abrasion. The fiber yarns may be dyed various colors, or may be left natural.

Coatings and liners use synthetic rubbers, which provide varying degrees of resistance to chemicals, temperature, ozone, ultraviolet (UV) radiation, mold, mildew, and abrasion. Different coatings and liners are chosen for specific applications.

== Manufacturing process ==
Fire hose is usually manufactured in a plant that specializes in providing hose products to municipal, industrial, and forestry fire departments. Here is a typical sequence of operations used to manufacture a double jacket, rubber-lined fire hose.

Preparing the yarn

- There are two different fiber yarns that are woven together to form a hose jacket. The yarns that run lengthwise down the hose are warp yarns and are usually made from spun polyester or filament nylon. They form the inner and outer surfaces of the jacket and provide abrasion resistance for the hose. The yarns that are wound in a tight spiral around the circumference of the hose are the filler yarns and are made from filament polyester. They are trapped between the crisscrossing warp yarns and provide strength to resist the internal water pressure. The spun polyester warp yarns are specially prepared by a yarn manufacturer and are shipped to the hose plant. No further preparation is needed.
- The continuous filament polyester fibers are gathered together in a bundle of 7–15 fibers and are twisted on a twister frame to form filler yarns. The plied and twisted yarn is then wound onto a spool called a filler bobbin.

Weaving the jackets

- The warp yarns are staged on a creel, which will feed them lengthwise down through a circular loom. Two filler bobbins with the filler yarn are put in place in the loom.
- As the loom starts, the filler bobbins wind the filler yarn in a circle through the warp yarns. As soon as the bobbins pass, the loom crisscrosses each pair of adjacent warp yarns to trap the filler yarn between them. This weaving process continues at a high speed as the lower end of the jacket is slowly drawn down through the loom, and the bobbins continue to wrap the filler yarns around the circumference of the jacket in a tight spiral. The woven jacket is wound flat on a take-up reel.
- The inner and outer jackets are woven separately. The inner jacket is woven to a slightly smaller diameter so that it will fit inside the outer jacket. Depending on the expected demand, several thousand feet of jacket may be woven at one time. After an inspection, the two jackets are placed in storage.
- If the outer jacket is to be coated, it is drawn through a dip tank filled with the coating material and then passed through an oven where the coating is dried and cured.

Extruding the liner

- Blocks of softened, sticky, uncured rubber are fed into an extruder. The extruder warms the rubber and presses it out through an opening between an inner and outer solid circular piece to form a tubular liner.
- The rubber liner is then heated in an oven where it undergoes a chemical reaction called vulcanizing, or curing. This makes the rubber strong and pliable.
- The cured liner passes through a machine called a rubber calender, which forms a thin sheet of uncured rubber and wraps it around the outside of the liner.

Forming the hose

- The jackets and liner are cut to the desired length. The inner jacket is inserted into the outer jacket, followed by the liner.
- A steam connection is attached to each end of the assembled hose, and pressurized steam is injected into the hose. This makes the liner swell against the inner jacket and causes the thin sheet of uncured rubber to vulcanize and bond the liner to the inner jacket.
- The metal end connections, or couplings, are attached to the hose. The outer portion of each coupling is slipped over the outer jacket and an inner ring is inserted into the rubber liner. A tool called an expansion mandrel is placed inside the hose and expands the ring. This squeezes the jackets and liner between the ring and serrations on the outer portion of the coupling to form a seal all the way around the hose.

Pressure-testing the hose

- Standards set by the National Fire Protection Association require that each length of new double jacket, rubber-lined attack hose must be pressure-tested to 600 psi (41.4 bar; 4,140 kPa), but most manufacturers test to 800 psi (55.2 bar; 5,520 kPa). Subsequent to delivery, the hose is tested annually to 400 psi (27.6 bar; 2,760 kPa) by the fire department. While the hose is under pressure, it is inspected for leaks and to determine that the couplings are firmly attached.
- After testing the hose is drained, dried, rolled, and shipped to the customer.

Quality control

In addition to the final pressure testing, each hose is subjected to a variety of inspections and tests at each stage of manufacture. Some of these inspections and tests include visual inspections, ozone resistance tests, accelerated aging tests, adhesion tests of the bond between the liner and inner jacket, determination of the amount of hose twist under pressure, dimensional checks, and many more.

=== Future ===
The trend in fire hose construction over the last 20 years has been to use lighter, stronger, lower-maintenance materials.

This trend is expected to continue in the future as new materials and manufacturing methods evolve. One result of this trend has been the introduction of lightweight supply hoses in diameters never possible before. Hoses up to 12 in (30.5 cm) in diameter with pressure ratings up to 150 psi (10.3 bar; 1,030 kPa) are now available. These hoses are expected to find applications in large-scale industrial firefighting, as well as in disaster relief efforts and military operations.

Fire hoses come in a variety of diameters. Lightweight, single-jacket construction, 3/4, 1, and 1 1/2 inch diameter hose lines are commonly used in wildfire suppression applications. Heavy duty double, double-jacket, 1 1/2, 1 3/4, 2, 2 1/2, and on occasion 3-inch lines are used for structural applications. Supply lines, used to supply firefighting apparatus with water, are frequently found in 3 1/2, 4, 4 1/2, 5 and 6-inch diameters.

There are several systems available for repairing holes in fire hoses, the most common being the Stenor Merlin, which offer patching materials for Type 1, 2, and 3 hoses. The patches come in two different sizes and two different colours (red and yellow). The patches are vulcanised onto the hose and usually last the lifetime of the hose.

== Connections ==
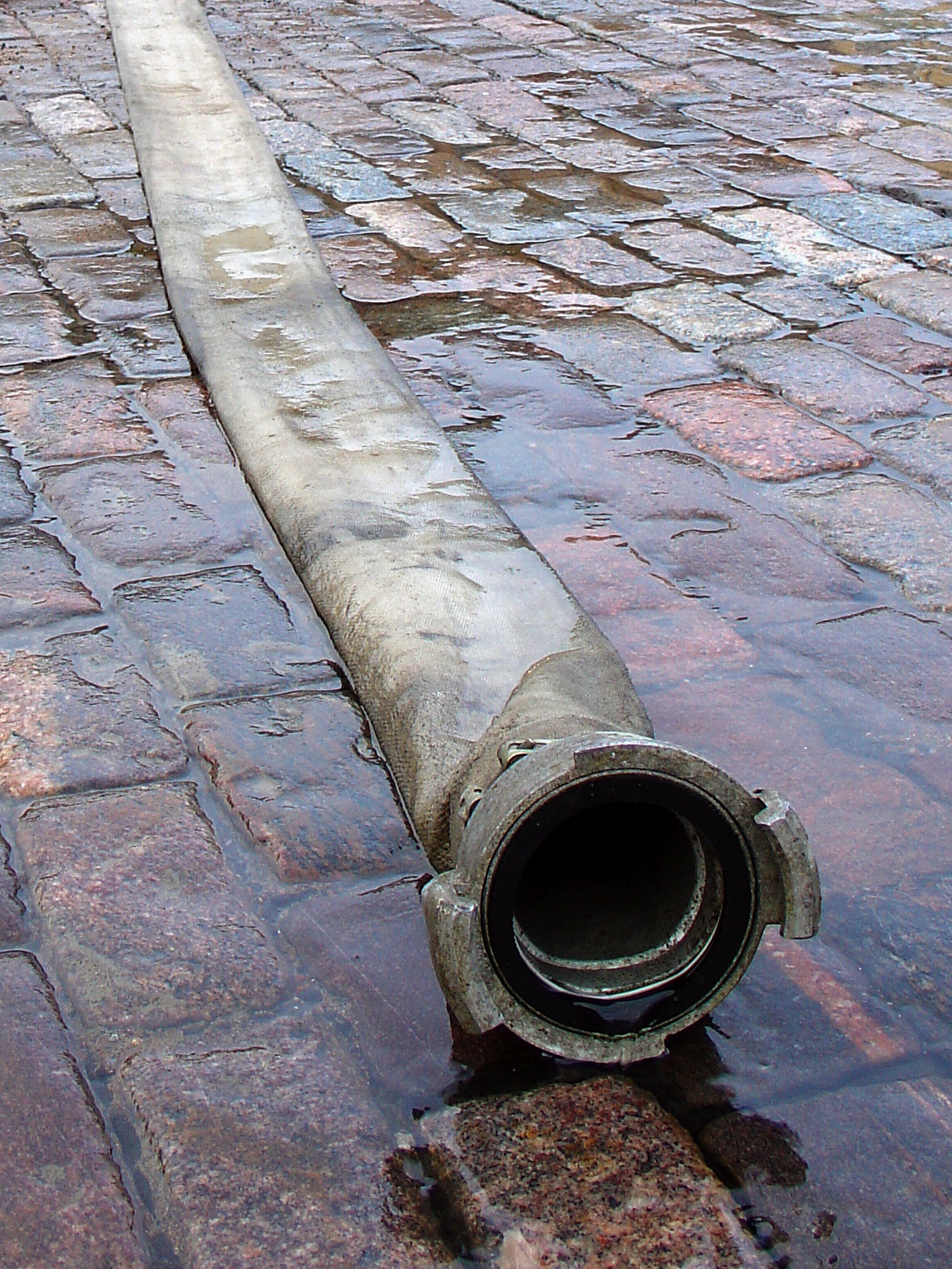
Fire hose with Finnish coupler

Hose connections are often made from brass, though hardened aluminum connections are also specified. In countries which use quick-action couplers for attack hoses, forged aluminum has been used for decades because the weight penalty of brass for Storz couplers is higher than for threaded connections.

Threaded hose couplings are used in the United States and Canada. Each of these countries uses a different kind of threading. Many other countries have standardized on quick-action couplings, which do not have a male and female end, but connect either way. Again, there is no international standard: In Central Europe, the Storz connector is used by several countries. Belgium and France use the Guillemin connector. Spain, Sweden and Norway each have their own quick coupling. Countries of the former Soviet Union area use the Gost coupling. Baarle-Nassau and Baarle-Hertog, two municipalities on the Belgian-Dutch border, share a common international fire department. The fire trucks have been equipped with adapters to allow them to work with both Storz and Guillemin connectors.

In the United States, a growing number of departments use Storz couplers for large-diameter supply hose, or other quick-action couplings. Because the usage is not standardized, mutual aid apparatus might have a compartment on their trucks dedicated to a multitude of hose adapters.

The different styles of hose couplings have influenced fireground tactics. Apparatus in the United States features "preconnects": Hose for a certain task is put into an open compartment, and each attack hose is connected to the pump. Time-consuming multiple connections or problems with male and female ends are avoided by such tactics. In countries where Storz (or similar) connectors have been used for attack hoses for generations, firefighters drop a manifold at the border of the danger zone, which is connected to the apparatus by a single supply line. As a result, the tiny item "hose coupler" has also influenced the looks and design of fire apparatus.

== Forces on fire hoses and nozzles ==
Fire hoses must sustain high tensile forces during operation. These arise from both pressure and flow. The magnitude of the axial tension in a fire hose is

$$T = p A_1 + \rho Q^2 / A_1 ,$$

where p is pressure in the hose relative to the ambient pressure, A_{1} is the hose cross-sectional area, ρ is the water density, and Q is the volumetric flow rate. This tension is the same regardless of the bend angle of the hose.

When a nozzle is connected to a hose and water is ejected, the nozzle must be restrained by an anchor such as the hands of a firefighter. This anchor must apply a force in the direction of the spray, which is called the nozzle reaction. The magnitude of the nozzle reaction is the jet momentum flow rate,

$R = \rho Q^2 / A_2 ,$

where A_{2} is the cross-sectional area of the nozzle.

== See also ==
- Garden hose
- Hose bridge
- Hose coupling
