= Standpipe (firefighting) =

Firefighting water supply

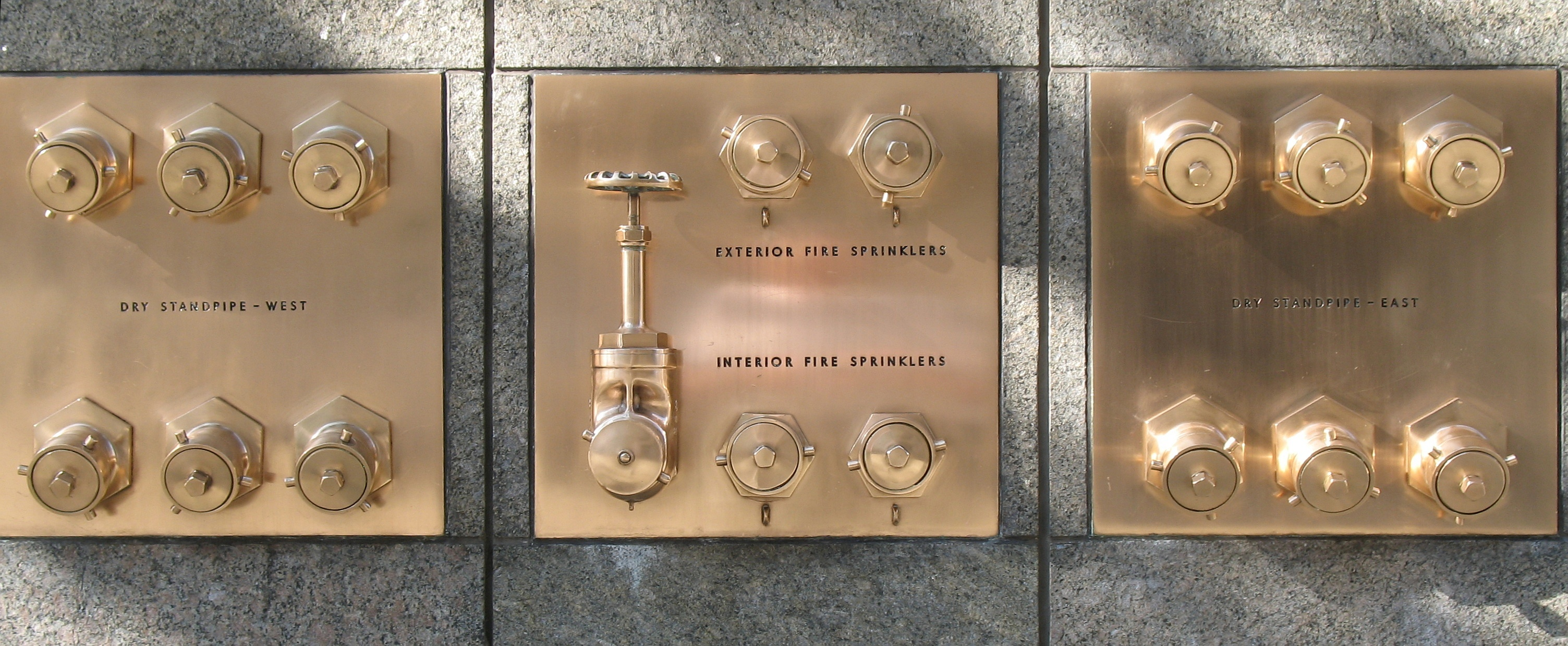
External access point for fire sprinkler and dry standpipe at a building in San Francisco, US

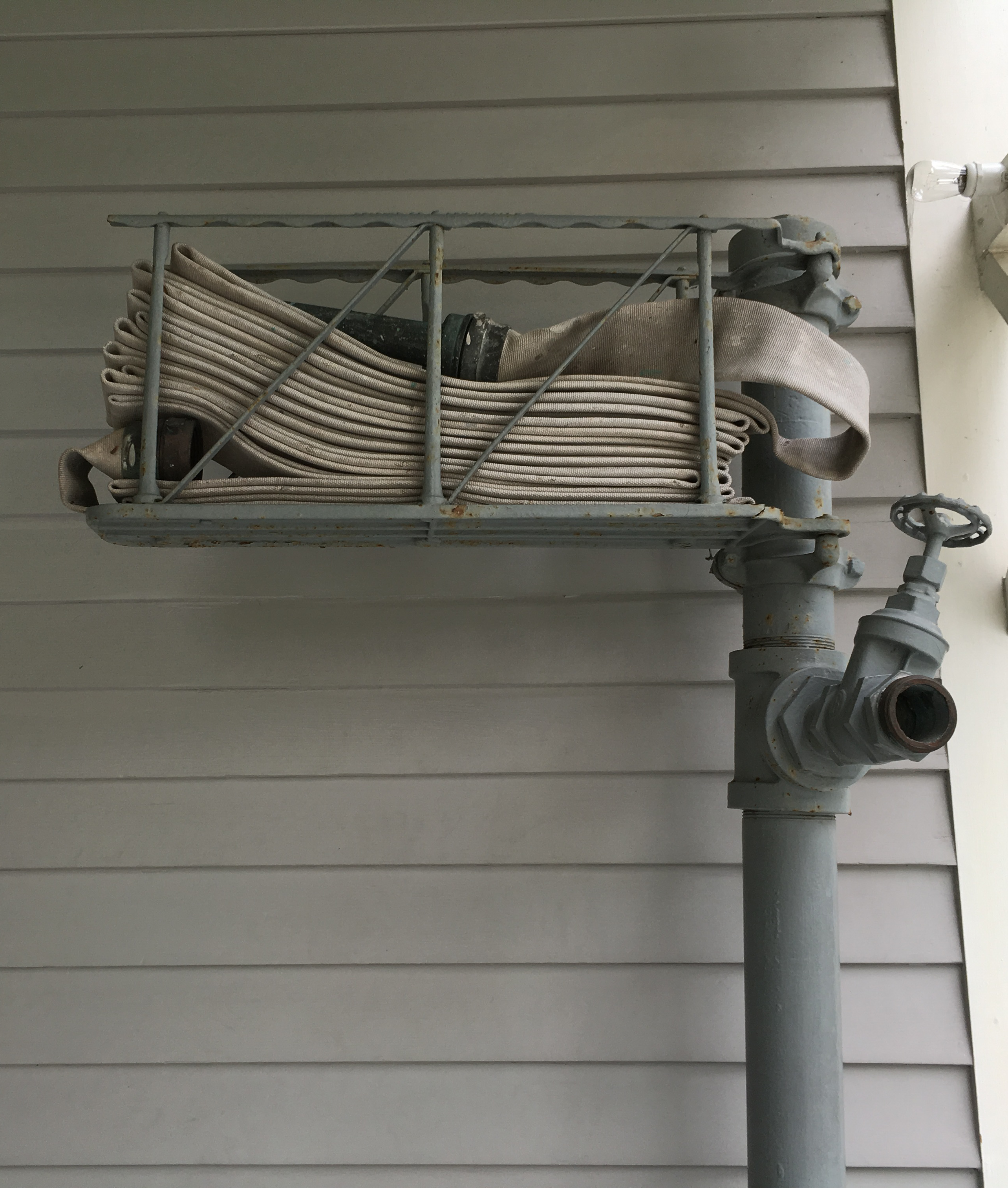
Antique wet standpipe preserved at Edison and Ford Winter Estates

A standpipe or riser is a type of rigid water piping which is built into multi-story buildings in a vertical position, or into bridges in a horizontal position, to which fire hoses can be connected, allowing manual application of water to the fire. Within the context of a building or bridge, a standpipe serves the same purpose as a fire hydrant. NFPA 14 - Standard for the Installation of Standpipe and Hose Systems regulates the design of standpipe system in the United States. Some standpipe systems are combined with fire sprinkler systems, using common pipes to supply both the sprinklers and hose connections.

== Types of standpipe systems ==
Fire standpipes have two main types: "Wet" and "Dry". The terms describe their state during normal, non-firefighting situations.

=== Dry standpipe ===
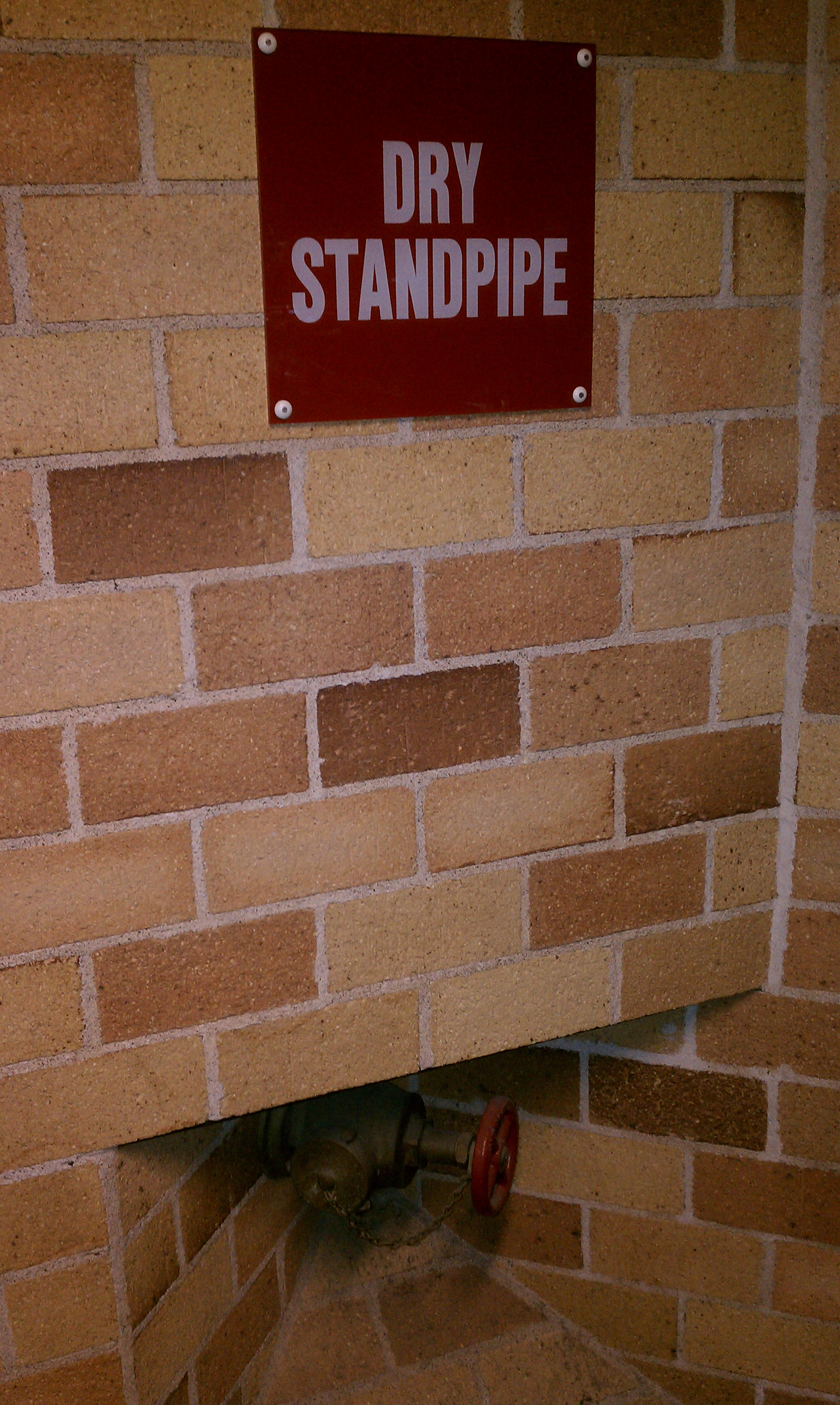
Labeled dry standpipe outlet in a university building

Dry standpipe systems do not contain water in the piping during normal, non-firefighting situations. Water is only introduced when needed for firefighting purposes.

Manual Dry Standpipe System - A standpipe system that is not connected to a water supply and requires water to be pumped into the system via a fire department connection (FDC), often by a fire truck.

Semiautomatic Dry Standpipe System - A standpipe system that is connected to a water supply and capable of supplying the water at any time, but requires the manual activation of a valve or other control to introduce the water into the system.

Automatic Dry Standpipe System - A standpipe system that is connected to a water supply and capable of supplying the water at any time, that is kept under air pressure, so that upon the opening of a hose supply connection valve, water is drawn into the system via a dry pipe valve. (Note: A special valve that is held closed by air pressure, but water will force open when the air pressure is removed.)

=== Wet standpipe ===
Wet standpipe systems contain water at all times.

Manual Wet Standpipe System - A standpipe system that contains water, but requires additional water to be pumped into the system via a fire department connection (FDC), often by a fire truck.

Automatic Wet Standpipe System - A standpipe system that is connected to a water supply and capable of supplying the water without any action except opening a hose supply connection valve.

Wet standpipe systems are often more complex and expensive to both install and maintain due to the presence of water always being in the system, and the need to supply water a specific pressures which may require the use of pumps.

== Standpipe classes ==
Under NFPA 14, standpipes designs are classified as Class I, II, or III based on intended user, size of hose connections and design pressure.

=== Class I ===
Class I standpipe systems are intended for use by firefighters, and consists of 2.5 inches (64 mm) hose connections to accommodate the fire hoses used by fire departments. Class I systems must be constructed with 4 inches (100 mm) pipe, and at least 6 inches (150 mm) in buildings with fire sprinkler systems to ensure adequate water supply during usage, and water pressure at the hose connection must be between 100–175 psi (6.9–12.1 bar).

=== Class II ===
Class II systems are intended for use by building occupants, such as employees, residents or members of the public, and include a hose station containing a 1.5 inches (38 mm) fire hose and nozzle pre-connected to the standpipe. Class II systems have become less common in recent years, but are still found in buildings. 1.5 inches (38 mm) hose no longer than 100 feet (30 m) must be installed and ready for firefighting usage in Class II systems.

Class II systems are required to be 'wet', except in regions subject to freezing temperatures and on-site personnel, such as an industrial fire brigade, are trained how to activate the system without assistance from the local fire department. Pipes supplying hose stations on Class II systems do not have a specified size, and must be calculated based on the needs of the specific system. Water pressure at hose connections must be between 65–100 psi (4.5–6.9 bar).

=== Class III ===
Class III systems are designed to include both Class I and Class II: An occupant operated 1.5 inches (38 mm) fire hose and 2.5 inches (64 mm) hose connections for firefighters. The system must be able to operate both the occupant hose and a firefighter's hose simultaneously, and comply with the design standards for both systems.

== Location of standpipes ==
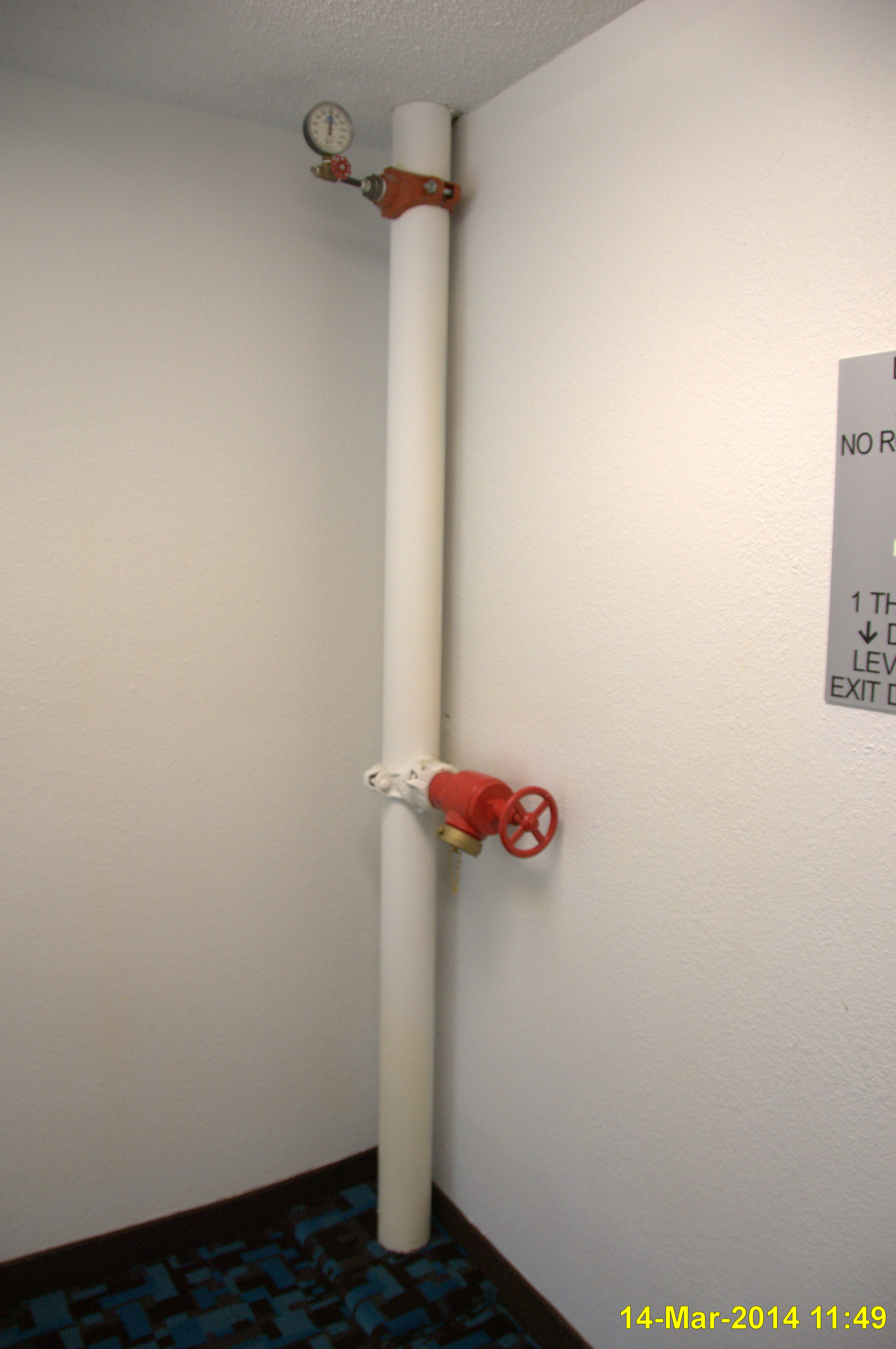
Standpipe equipped with pressure gauge in the stairwell of a Texas hotel

NFPA 14 requires that Class I and III standpipe hose connections be found at the main floor landing of exit stairways (Note: Landings that occur at actual floors, where an occupant can enter/exit the stairway), along exit routes, both sides of fire doors. Hose connections on standpipes also cannot be blocked by stairway doors, when open or closed positions.

Class II systems must be located on each floor, with hose stations distributed so an occupant is always within 120–130 feet (37–40 m) of a hose station.

Standpipe systems are required by the International Building Code (IBC) in the following situations:

- Structures that are 4 or more floors above ground level, or over 30 feet (9.1 m) above or below ground level.
- Structures allowed to contain more than 1,000 people.
- Shopping malls, both open and enclosed.
- Structures with stages larger than 1,000 square feet (93 m^{2})
- Underground structures
- Structures with rooftop heliports
- Marinas and boatyards
- Structures with landscaped roofs

== Disadvantages ==
Because standpipe systems are infrastructure that is installed by third parties well before use in a fire situation, they are susceptible to age-related damage and improper installation or maintenance that can hamper their use in an emergency situation. Further problems can arise when firefighters are not aware of the current status of the system.

During the One Meridian Plaza fire, firefighters were incapable of fighting the fire due to pressure reduction valves being improperly set too low, preventing fire hoses from operating correctly for the duration of the fire.

Two New York City firefighters died in the 2007 Deutsche Bank Building fire during its demolition. A factor that hampered extinguishing the fire was the standpipe system had been rendered inoperable during demolition and incorrect information from demolition workers regarding the status of the standpipe.

Firefighters must take precautions to flush the standpipe before use to clear out debris that could obstruct nozzles and hoses and ensure that water is available.

== See also ==
- Fire sprinkler
