= Hydraulic rescue tool =

Tool used by emergency rescue personnel to assist vehicle extrication of crash victims

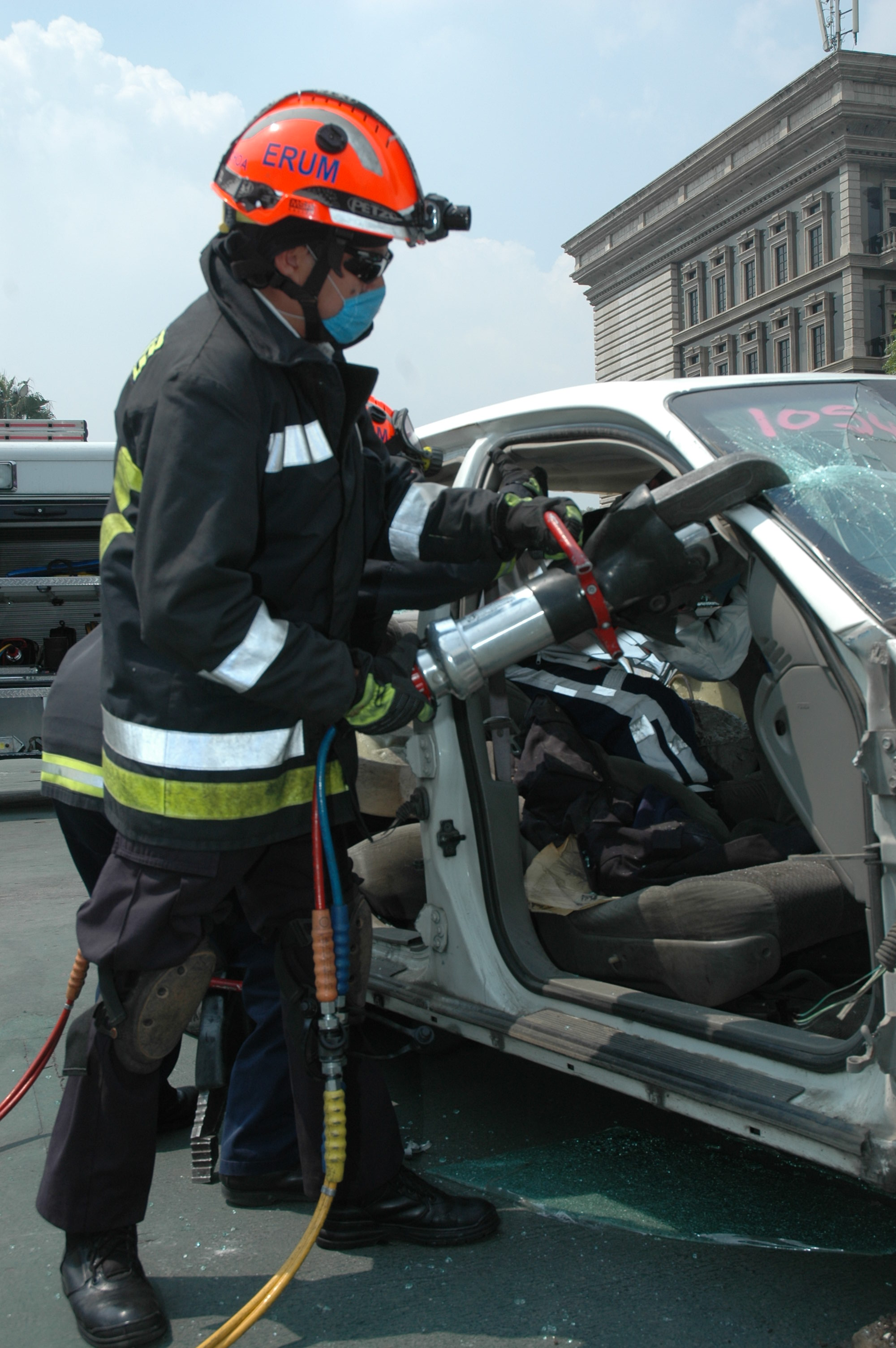
Hydraulic cutter in use during a demonstration at the Monterrey Institute of Technology and Higher Education, Mexico City

Hydraulic rescue tools, also known as jaws of life, are used by emergency rescue personnel to assist in the extrication of victims involved in a traffic collision or railway accidents and cutting large-sized debris of mild metal structures into smaller pieces for extraction of injured and dead victims out from building rubble in areas affected by earthquakes, as well as other rescues in small spaces. These tools include cutters, spreaders, and rams. Such devices were first used in 1963 as a tool to free race car drivers from their vehicles after crashes.

== History ==
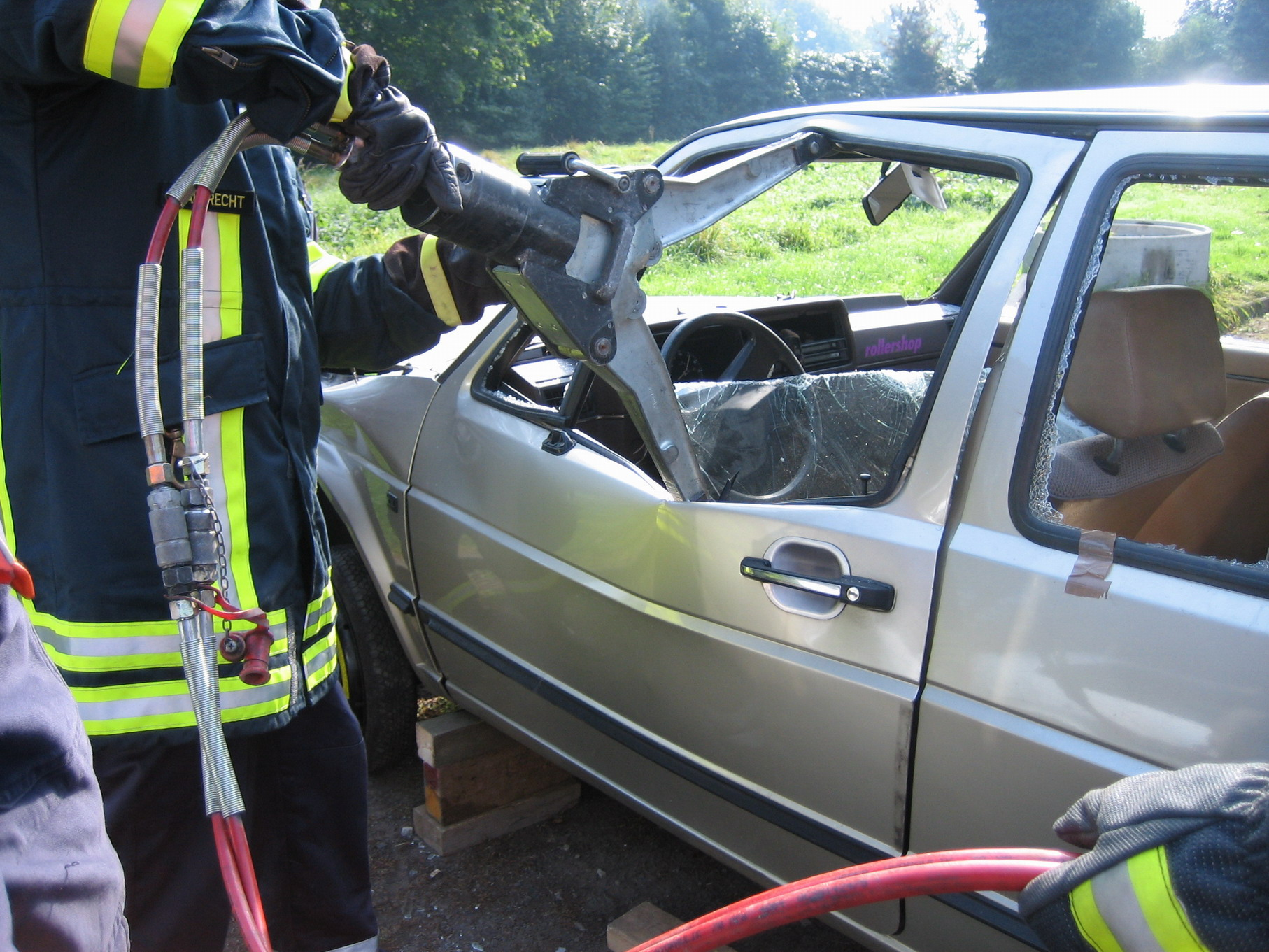
A hydraulic spreader in use, seen here widening a window on the door of a Volkswagen Golf Mk2 to allow fire crews access into the vehicle

The Hurst Rescue Tool was invented by George Hurst, circa 1961, after he viewed a stock car race accident in which it took workers over an hour to remove an injured driver from his car. Previously rescuers often used circular saws for vehicle extrication, but these suffered from several drawbacks. Saws can create sparks that could start a fire, create loud sounds, stress the victims, and often cut slowly. Alternatively, rescuers could try to pry open the vehicle doors with a crowbar or Halligan bar, but this could compromise the stability of the vehicle, or injure the victims further.

In comparison, hydraulic spreader-cutters are quieter, faster, stronger, and more versatile: they can cut, open, and even lift a vehicle. Hurst Performance began to export parts to a European company, Zumro ResQtec, to avoid import duty. Zumro ResQtec was interested in developing these tools for use in auto racing, with ResQtec targeting the European market and Hurst targeting the American market. The hydraulic spreader was originally developed in 1972 by Tim Smith and Mike Brick, who later developed a cutter and a hydraulic ram. When an occupant is trapped the tool is used to pry or cut the car to remove the occupant. It takes about two minutes to take the roof off a car. Mike Brick coined the phrase "Jaws of Life" after he observed people saying that their new device "snatched people from the jaws of death", then used as a registered brand name for Hurst products. The name "jaws of life" is, however, used colloquially to describe other hydraulic rescue tools.

Brick later developed a single rescue tool that combines the functions (push, pull, cut and spread) of previous rescue tools, and patented it; the design is currently implemented as the Phoenix Rescue tool.

== Tool types ==
=== Cutters ===
The cutter is a pair of hydraulically powered shears that is designed to cut through metal. Cutters are most commonly used to cut through a vehicle's structure in an extraction operation. They are sometimes specified as to their capacity to cut a solid circular steel bar. Cutter blades are replaceable, and blade development progresses as vehicle technology progresses in order to be able to cope with the new car protection technology.

=== Spreader ===
A spreader is a hydraulic tool that is designed with two arms that come together in a narrow tip, and that uses hydraulic pressure to separate or spread the arms. The tip of the tool can be inserted into a narrow gap between two vehicle panels (such as between two doors, or between a door and a fender), then operated to create or widen an opening. Spreaders may also be used to "open" vehicle doors from their hinges.

=== Combination spreader ===
While a cutter or spreader tool is designed for a particular application, a combination tool (also known as a combi-tool or spreader-cutter) combines cutting and spreading functions into a single tool. In operation, the tips of the spreader-cutter's blades are wedged into a seam or gap—for example, around a vehicle door—and the device engaged. The hydraulic pump, attached to the tool or as a separate unit, powers a piston that pushes the blades apart with great force and spreads the seam. Once the seam has been spread, the now-open blades can be repositioned around the metal. The device is engaged in reverse and the blades close, cutting through metal. Repeating this process allows a rescuer to quickly open a gap wide enough to pull free a trapped victim. The blades can spread or cut with a force of several tons or kilonewtons with the tips of the blades spreading up to a meter.

This operation can also be performed by dedicated spreading and cutting tools, which are designed especially for their own operations and may be required for some rescues. Spreader-cutters sometimes have lower capabilities when compared to the dedicated tool (e.g. a smaller spreading range) but may be useful where space is at a premium on fire and rescue vehicles, or when the budget does not allow for a separate cutter and spreader tool.

Many manufacturers utilize the body of their dedicated cutting tool for the combination tool. Specially engineered combination blades that are designed to spread and cut are used on the cutter body. If the end user decides later to add a separate cutter and spreader, the blades of the combination tool can be changed to make it a cutter only.

=== Extension rams ===
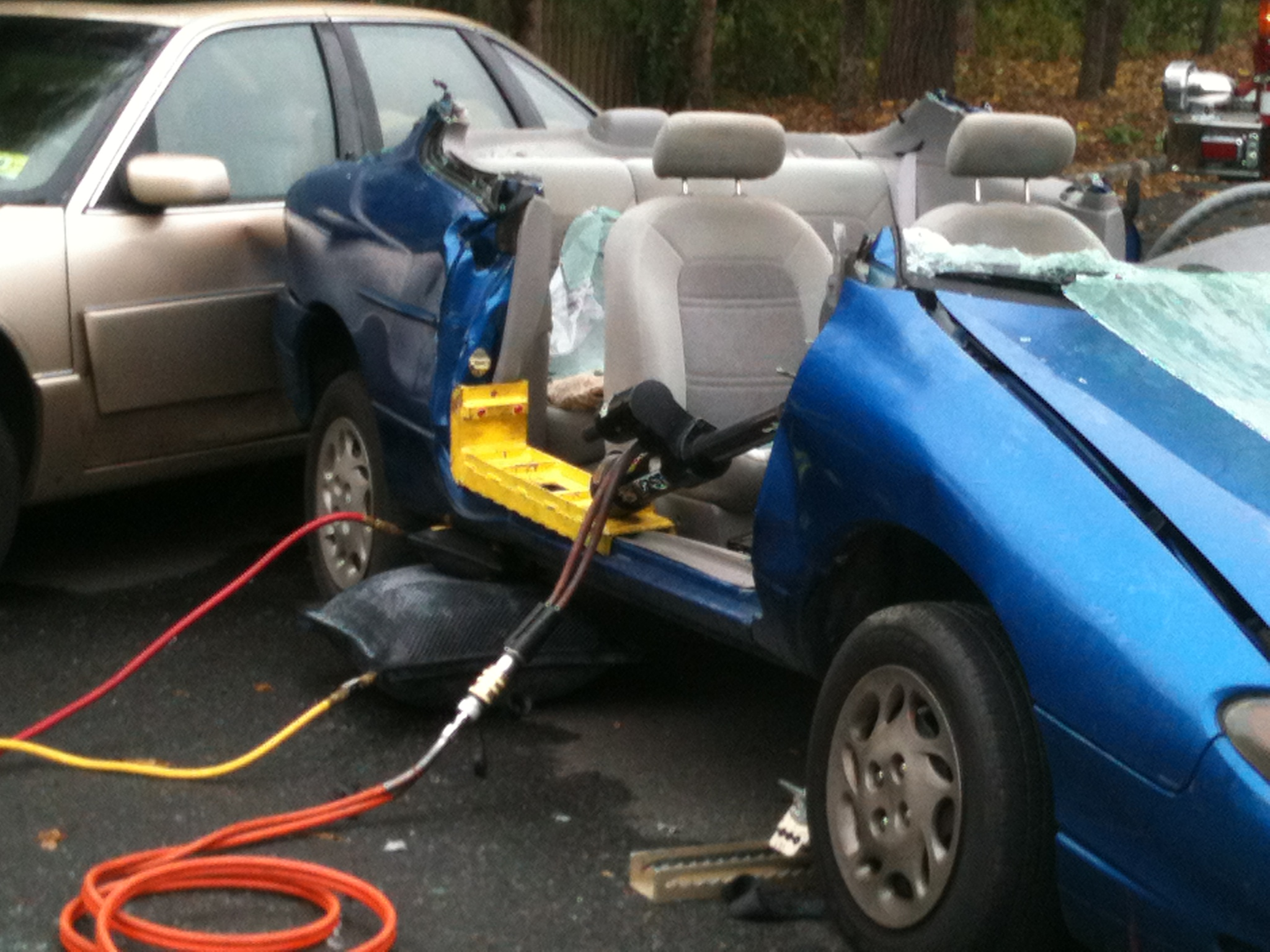
A demonstration of using a hydraulic ram to open up the space at the passenger leg area

An extension ram consists of a piston or telescoping cylinder that extends under hydraulic pressure to exert force on vehicle structures. Rams are used less often than spreader-cutters in auto rescues, but serve an important purpose of creating space in compacted vehicles. Rams can extend and apply directed force much farther than the arms of a spreader, making them ideal for reaching deep into crushed vehicle compartments. For example, a ram may be used to push away the dashboard to free a trapped occupant’s legs. There are many types and sizes of rams, including single-piston, dual-piston and telescopic rams. Sizes commonly vary from 50.8 cm (20.0 in) to 178 cm (70 in) (extended). Rams use more hydraulic fluid during operation than spreader-cutters, so it is essential that the pump being used has enough capacity to allow the ram to reach full extension.

== Power ==
The tools operate on the basis of the hydraulic fluid pressure of up to 720 bars (10,400 psi; 72 MPa), which must be provided from a power source. At present, there are three different means of generating pressure. The most commonly used source is a separate power unit, small petrol (gasoline) engine connected to a hydraulic pump. The hydraulic fluid is pressurised in the pump and conveyed in a hose under pressure to the tool.

Alternative power sources are a small electrical pump in the tool powered by a heavy-duty rechargeable battery or hand- or foot-operated pumps, also connected to the tool directly. These are useful for lighter-duty use and do not require the storage space taken up by the separate power unit and associated lengths of hose.

Some manufacturers have begun offering all-electric products driving rotation motors or a screw piston. These are still relatively new on the market and thus may still be somewhat immature but potentially offer many benefits over hydraulic such as but not limited to lower cost of ownership, quicker, more direct and responsive operation, decreased weight, improved portability and handling, and greater reliability.

== See also ==
- Bolt cutter
- Pneumatic lifting bag

== Companies ==
- IDEX Corporation
- Holmatro
