= 2015 Indianapolis 500 =

American motor race

Indianapolis Motor Speedway

Indianapolis 500
- Sanctioning body: IndyCar
- Season: 2015 IndyCar Series season
- Date: May 24, 2015
- Winner: (Colombia) Juan Pablo Montoya
- Winning team: Team Penske
- Winning Chief Mechanic: Vance Welker
- Time of race: 3:05:56.5286
- Average speed: 161.341 mph (259.653 km/h)
- Pole position: (New Zealand) Scott Dixon
- Pole speed: 226.760 mph (364.935 km/h)
- Fastest qualifier: (New Zealand) Scott Dixon
- Rookie of the Year: (Colombia) Gabby Chaves
- Most laps led: (New Zealand) Scott Dixon (84)

Pre-race ceremonies
- National anthem: Jordin Sparks
- "Back Home Again in Indiana": Straight No Chaser
- Starting command: Mari Hulman George
- Pace car: Chevrolet Corvette Z06
- Pace car driver: Jeff Gordon
- Two-seater: Mario Andretti (driver); Adam Carolla (passenger)
- Starter: Paul Blevin
- Honorary starter: Patrick Dempsey
- Estimated attendance: 220,000

Television in the United States
- Network: ABC
- Announcers: Allen Bestwick, Scott Goodyear, Eddie Cheever
- Nielsen ratings: 4.3 (6.4 million viewers)

Chronology
Previous	Next
2014	2016

Indianapolis Motor Speedway layout

The 2015 Indianapolis 500 was held at the Indianapolis Motor Speedway in Speedway, Indiana on Sunday May 24, 2015. It was the premier event of the 2015 season of the Verizon IndyCar Series. Juan Pablo Montoya won his second Indianapolis 500, followed in the finish by Will Power, Charlie Kimball, polesitter Scott Dixon, and Graham Rahal.

For the second year in a row, the month of May activities opened with the Grand Prix of Indianapolis over May 7–9. Practice opened on May 11, and time trials were held on May 16–17. Rain interrupted and eventually washed out time trials on May 16, and all qualifications were held on Sunday May 17.

The victory capped off a successful return to Indy car racing for Montoya. The 1999 CART champion and 2000 Indy 500 winner had left American open-wheel racing for Formula One for 2001–2005. He then switched to the NASCAR Cup Series, and also competed in Grand Am. Out of Indy car racing for thirteen seasons, Montoya surprisingly signed with Team Penske for 2014, and finished 5th in the 2014 race, only his second Indy 500 start. Later that year he won the Pocono 500, and by winning the 2015 Indy 500, set a record for most years between two victories - fifteen years (2000 and 2015).

The 2015 race saw the debut of unique aero kits from Chevrolet and Honda, respectively, outfitted for the Dallara DW12 chassis. As part of the ICONIC project, aero kits were originally planned for 2012, but a series of delays due to cost issues put off their homologation and implementation until 2015. During practice, three Chevrolet entries suffered major crashes that resulted in flip-overs. The crashes raised safety concerns around the paddock, and series officials delayed time trials for several hours in order to address the situation with rule and procedural changes, removing qualifying from its status as a points-paying event.

During a practice session on May 18, IndyCar's Holmatro Safety Team was lauded for a life-saving effort in their rescue of driver James Hinchcliffe. During the run, Hinchcliffe was involved in a major crash, and was impaled by a suspension member. The rapid response by the medical crews was credited with likely saving his life, and nine days later he was released from Methodist Hospital, expected to make a full recovery. Hinchcliffe was able to drive the IndyCar two-seater at a promotional event in August at the Golden Gate Bridge, then made his first competitive laps in a Dan Wheldon Memorial karting event in September.

== Race background ==
=== Entry list ===
- 1996 winner Buddy Lazier stated his intention to return in 2015 with his family-owned Lazier Partners Racing, but did not qualify.
- Jonathan Byrd II fielded a new team, Jonathan Byrd's Racing, paying homage to his late father Jonathan Byrd, an Indy 500 enthusiast who owned a local cafeteria and sponsored cars driven by such drivers as Stan Fox, Arie Luyendyk, and Rich Vogler. Their driver was Bryan Clauson.
- On November 3, 2014, a third standalone entry was announced, with Jay Howard running #97 for Bryan Herta Autosport. However, funding for this car fell through, and BHA only ran their full season #98 for Gabby Chaves.
- On April 2, 2015, it was announced Simona de Silvestro would be making an attempt at the race driving the #29 Honda for Andretti Autosport.

=== Rules and rule changes ===
- Each entry were allowed 36 sets of tires (Firestone) total, for practice, time trials, and for the race. This is up from 33 sets previously. The special compound "red" tires are not used for oval events.
  - Entries participating in the promoter's open test on May 3 received four additional sets for use on that day only.
  - Entries taking part in a rookie test or a refresher test received an additional set(s) specifically to use for the respective test.
- Engines were permitted 130 kPa of turbocharger "boost" during the promoter's open test on May 3, and during practice from May 11–14. Cars were allowed 140 kPa of "boost" on Fast Friday practice, and during time trials. The "boost" level reverted to 130 kPa for Carb day and race day.
  - Note: Increased "boost" for time trials was rescinded by officials after crashes during practice (see below).

=== Pre-race ceremonies ===
- The a cappella group Straight No Chaser performed "Back Home Again in Indiana" during the pre-race ceremonies. The group replaced Jim Nabors, who sang for the final time in 2014.
- On May 19, it was announced that recording artist Jordin Sparks will perform the National Anthem
- Four-time Indy 500 winner Al Unser Sr. was honored during Legends Day festivities.

== Schedule ==
Track activities began on Sunday May 3, with Opening Day, featuring the debut of oval aero kits. A full-field open test and rookie orientation took place on the oval from 9:30 a.m. to 5 p.m. During the week, the track was reconfigured to the road course configuration. After the Grand Prix was concluded, the track was closed on Mother's Day, unlike 2014. On Sunday May 10, the track was converted back to the oval configuration, meanwhile, teams had the day to convert the cars from road course to oval set-up.

The track re-opened in oval configuration starting Monday May 11. A second session of rookie orientation was reserved for the track on Monday (if needed), with veterans taking to the track in the afternoon. Practice on Tuesday through Friday was held from 12 noon to 6 p.m. For the second year in a row, a post-qualifying practice session was held on the Monday after pole day. For the second year in a row, time trials were conducted with a combined two-day format. The 33 cars that comprised the field was determined on Saturday, while the starting lineup was set on Sunday.

Race schedules — April/May 2015
Sun	Mon	Tue	Wed	Thu	Fri	Sat
26	27	28	29	30	1	2 Mini-Marathon
3 ROP; Open Test	4	5	6 Road to Indy; Open test	7 Grand Prix; Practice	8 Grand Prix; Qualifying	9 Grand Prix of Indianapolis
10; Car conversion day	11; ROP; Practice	12; Practice	13; Practice	14; Practice	15; Practice; Fast Friday	16; Time Trials
17; Pole Day	18; VICS and Lights; Practice	19	20; Community; Day	21; IL Qualifying; Briscoe test	22; Carb Day; Freedom 100	23; Legends Day; Parade
24; Indianapolis; 500	25; Memorial; Day	26	27	28	29	30
31						

Color	Notes
Green	Practice
Dark Blue	Time trials
Silver	Race day
Red	Rained out*
Blank	No track activity

* Includes days where track
activity was significantly limited due to rain

== Testing and Rookie orientation ==
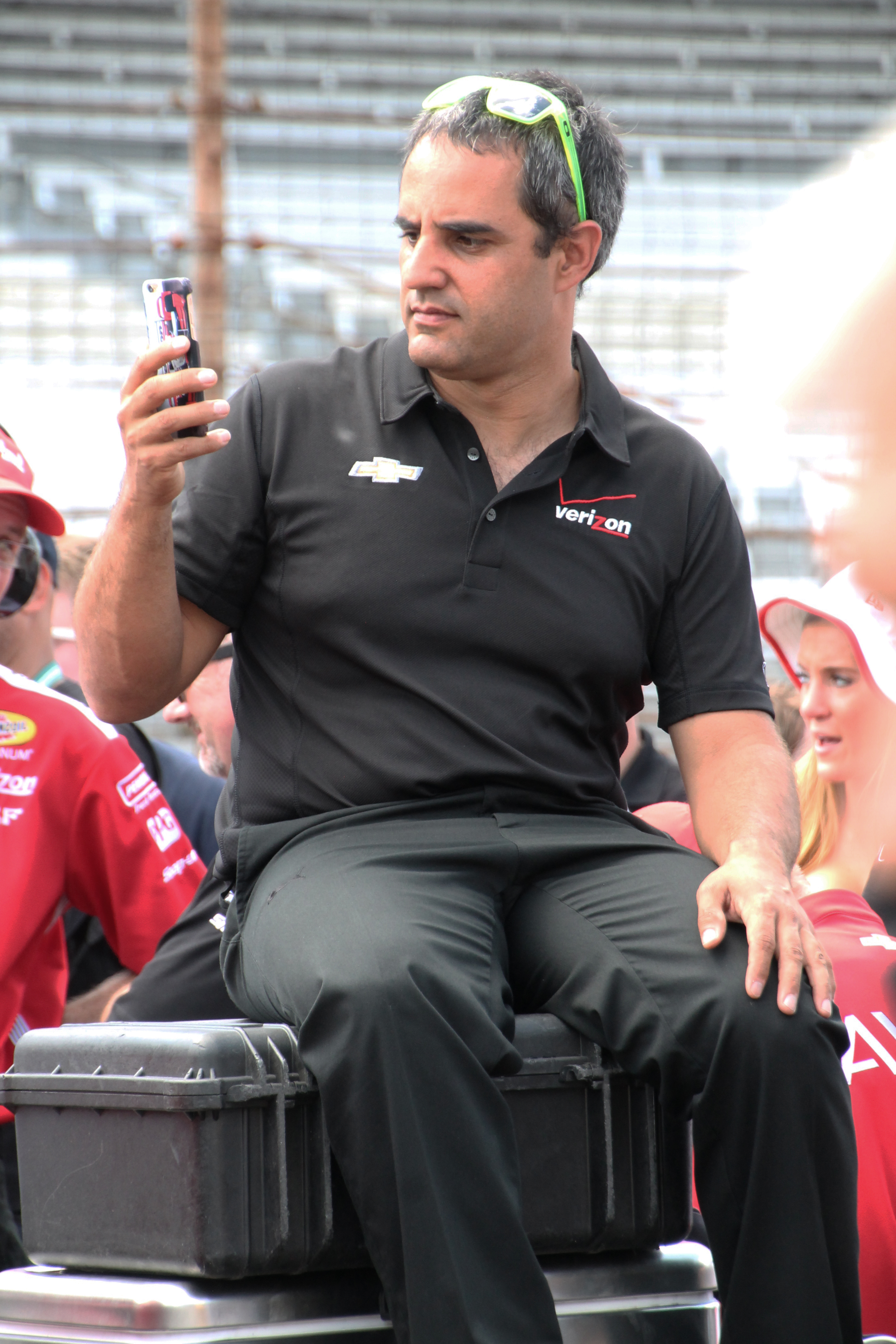
Juan Pablo Montoya turned the fastest lap on Opening Day.

=== Rookie Orientation / Refresher tests – Sunday May 3 ===
The track was reserved for rookie orientation from 10:45 a.m. to 12 p.m. The 40-lap rookie test consists of three phases, demonstrating car control, placement, and a consistent driving pattern. Phase one consists of 10 laps at 205-210 mph, phase two consists of 15 laps at 210-215 mph, and phase three requires 15 laps at over 215 mph. Series rookie Gabby Chaves completed all three phases, while Stefano Coletti was out of the country and completed the test on May 11.

Refresher tests were completed by Bryan Clauson, Simona de Silvestro, Oriol Servià, Pippa Mann, Justin Wilson, James Jakes, Conor Daly and Sage Karam. Davey Hamilton came out of retirement to drive the Dreyer & Reinbold/Kingdom Racing entry to shake down the car as a substitute for Townsend Bell, who was competing in the IMSA Monterey Sports Car Championships at Laguna Seca.

=== Promoter's open test – Sunday May 3 ===
Opening day featured a full-field open test on Sunday May 3, concentrating on the new oval aero kits. The track was available for veteran drivers from 9:30 a.m. to 10:45 a.m., then for all drivers from 1 p.m. to 5 p.m. A total of 28 cars completed 1,845 laps without incident. Juan Pablo Montoya led the speed chart with a top lap of 226.772 mph. A total of 21 drivers exceeded the fastest lap from opening day of 2014. Though Montoya was the over fastest for the day, Hélio Castroneves reportedly ran the fastest single lap without a tow.

- Weather: 72 °F (22 °C), mostly sunny

Top Practice Speeds
Pos	No.	Driver	Team	Engine	Speed
1	2	(Colombia) Juan Pablo Montoya	Team Penske	Chevrolet	226.772
2	3	(Brazil) Hélio Castroneves	Team Penske	Chevrolet	226.468
3	27	(United States) Marco Andretti	Andretti Autosport	Honda	226.268
OFFICIAL REPORT

== Practice ==
=== Monday May 11 ===
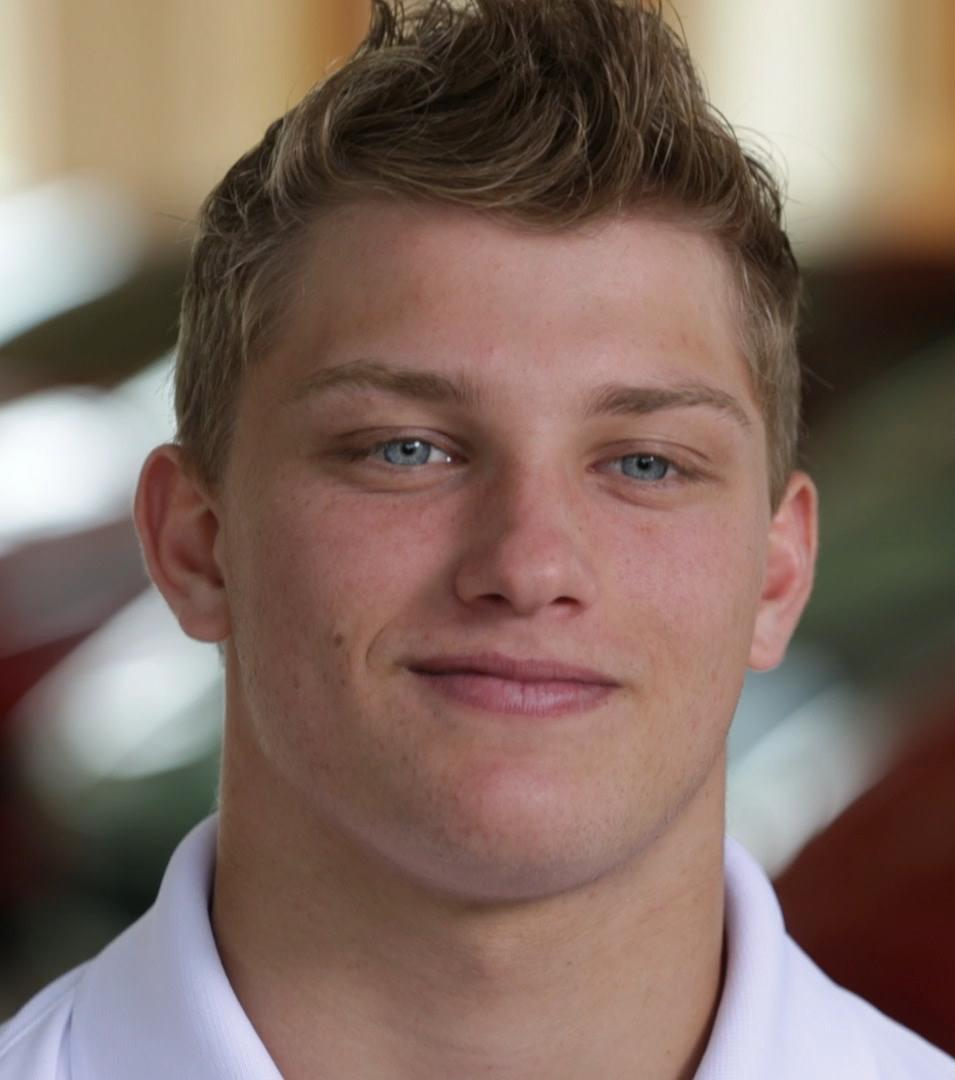
Sage Karam led the speed chart on Monday.

The first day of practice was scheduled for Monday May 11. The day opened with rookie orientation and refresher tests. J. R. Hildebrand and Townsend Bell led the early speeds during the refresher tests, while Stefano Coletti completed his rookie test. Heavy rain halted track activity at about 1:45 p.m. The track re-opened at 4:15 p.m. for full-field practice. At 4:32 p.m., James Jakes's crew suffered a broken inertial starter, which in-turn, threw debris and injured a crew member. At 6:15 p.m., Stefano Coletti did a half-spin in pit lane, but did not make contact. A total of 30 cars completed 1,094 laps, with Sage Karam (225.802 mph), the fastest overall for the day. Karam's Ganassi teammate Scott Dixon posted the fastest "no-tow" lap at 224.443 mph

- Weather: 77 °F (25 °C), overcast and rain

Top Practice Speeds — Overall
Pos	No.	Driver	Team	Engine	Speed
1	8	(United States) Sage Karam	Chip Ganassi Racing	Chevrolet	225.802
2	9	(New Zealand) Scott Dixon	Chip Ganassi Racing	Chevrolet	225.293
3	10	(Brazil) Tony Kanaan	Chip Ganassi Racing	Chevrolet	225.217
OFFICIAL REPORT

=== Tuesday May 12 ===
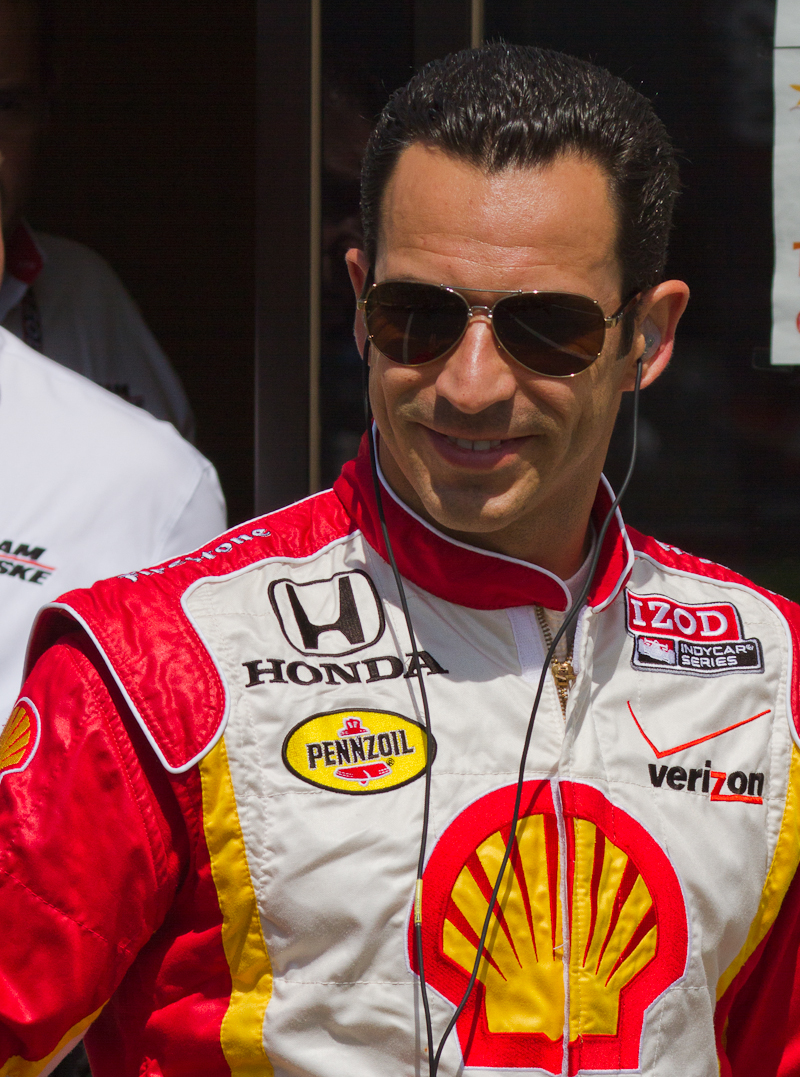
Hélio Castroneves was fastest on Tuesday.

The second day of practice was scheduled for May 12. At 2:07 p.m., Simona de Silvestro's car started smoking in the exit of turn two. Down the backstretch, a small fire broke out under the engine cover, and de Silvestro stopped the car near the warm up lane at the end of the backstretch. The car quickly became engulfed in flames, and de Silvestro quickly exited the car, uninjured. It was determined the fire was caused by a fuel leak in the refueling buckeye. Later in the day at 4:30 p.m., James Jakes car came to a stop at the entrance to the pit area with smoke pouring from the engine, and about 20 minutes later, Jack Hawksworth pulled into the grass in turn two with brake failure. The track closed five minutes early at 5:55 p.m. when Justin Wilson's engine blew going down the main stretch. Hélio Castroneves set the fast lap of the day, both overall (227.514 mph) and "no-tow" (225.315 mph). Several teams, including Andretti Autosport, Schmidt Peterson Motorsports, and Team Penske, went out together in groups, conducting drafting practice, ostensibly concentrating on race day set-ups.

- Weather: 62 °F (17 °C), cloudy, wind gusts up to 30 mph

Top Practice Speeds
Pos	No.	Driver	Team	Engine	Speed
1	3	(Brazil) Hélio Castroneves	Team Penske	Chevrolet	227.514
2	22	(France) Simon Pagenaud	Team Penske	Chevrolet	227.382
3	9	(New Zealand) Scott Dixon	Chip Ganassi Racing	Chevrolet	226.769
OFFICIAL REPORT

=== Wednesday May 13 ===
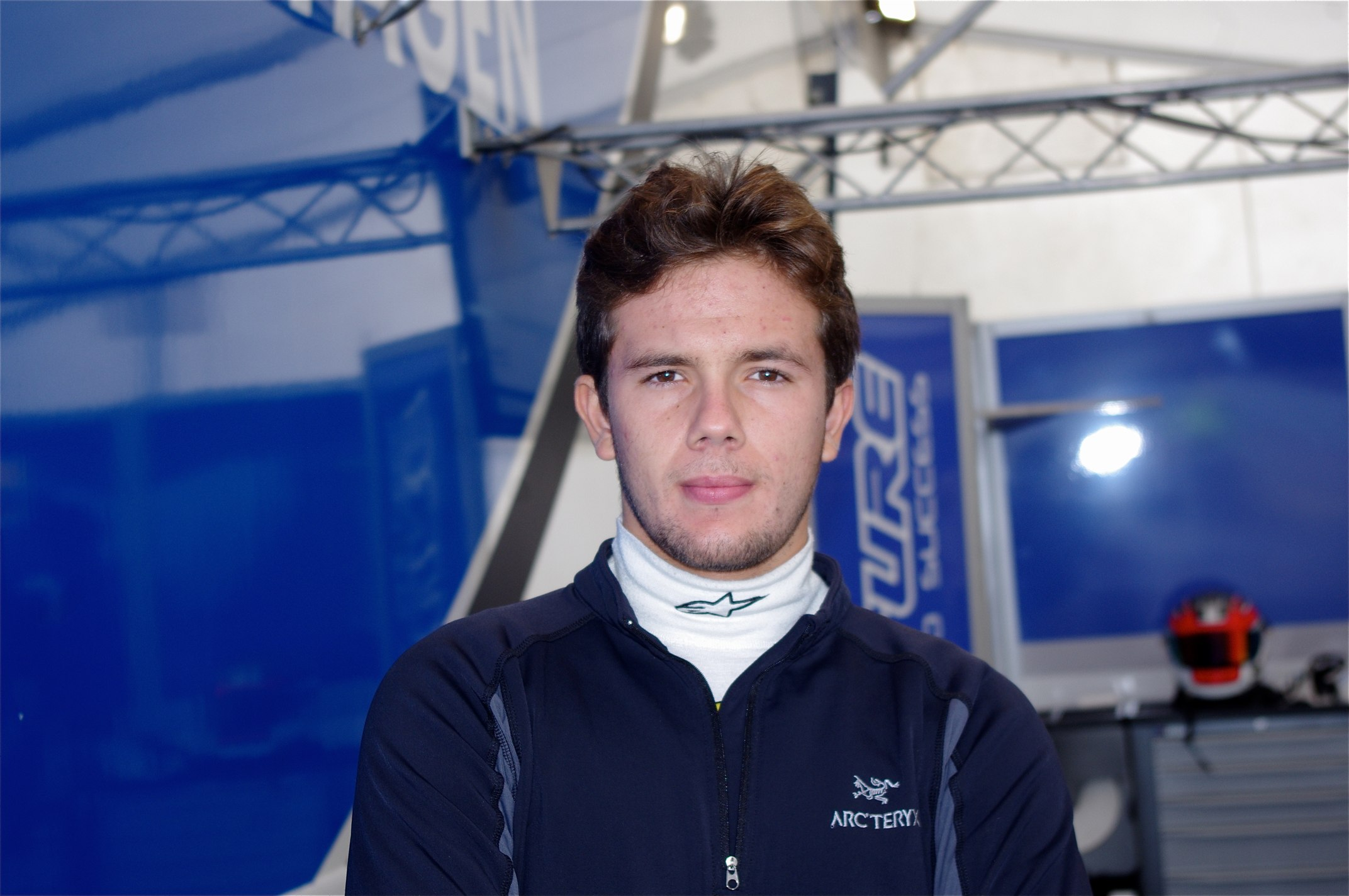
Carlos Muñoz broke the 230 mph barrier.

Two single-car incidents marred the third full day of practice. At 12:45 p.m., Hélio Castroneves' car stepped out in turn one. He did a half-spin, and hit the outside wall in the south short chute with the left side of the car. Sliding backwards, the car became airborne and did a flip, landing upright in turn two. Castroneves walked away uninjured. In the final hour, Pippa Mann went high through the exit of turn four, and spun at the north end of the main stretch. The car slid and hit the inside wall, then hit the attenuator at the end of the pit wall. The car violently spun back on to the main stretch, and came to rest against the outside wall. Mann was not seriously injured.

Track activity was highlighted by Carlos Muñoz, who turned the first 230 mph lap of the month. His lap of 230.121 came during "Happy Hour" with about six minutes left in the day. After the crew worked during the afternoon to prepare his back-up car, Hélio Castroneves was back out on the track turning laps after his wreck earlier in the day. Scott Dixon (226.411 mph) posted the fastest "no-tow" lap.

- Weather: 64 °F (18 °C), sunny and clear

Top Practice Speeds
Pos	No.	Driver	Team	Engine	Speed
1	26	(Colombia) Carlos Muñoz	Andretti Autosport	Honda	230.121
2	24	(United States) Townsend Bell	Dreyer & Reinbold Racing	Chevrolet	228.969
3	10	(Brazil) Tony Kanaan	Chip Ganassi Racing	Chevrolet	228.172
OFFICIAL REPORT

=== Thursday May 14 ===
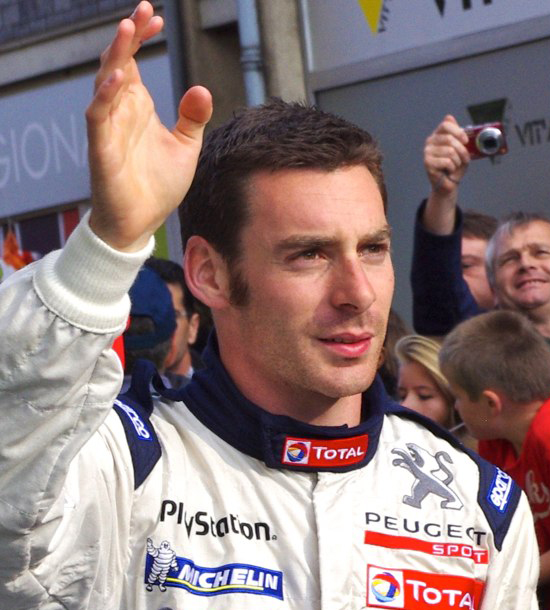
Simon Pagenaud topped the charts on Thursday and Fast Friday.

The second major crash in turn one in as many days occurred on Thursday. At 5:18 p.m., Josef Newgarden lost control in turn one, did a three-quarter spin, and hit the outside wall in the south short chute with the nose. The car flipped over, and slid to a rest upside-down near the entrance to turn two. Newgarden was uninjured, and the crash appeared vastly similar to Hélio Castroneves' a day earlier. The two accidents prompted officials to re-evaluate an optional Chevrolet aero kit rear wheel cap that had been installed on both cars.

Simon Pagenaud led the speed chart both overall (228.793 mph) and on the "no-tow" list (227.628 mph). By the end of the day Thursday, a total of 34 car/driver combinations have been on the track, including Buddy Lazier, who made his first track appearance of the month (under INDYCAR rules, Lazier's program, a single-race program, is not permitted on the track until the Thursday of the week). The last hour of the track saw heavy activity, with over 20 cars on the track at once, conducting race simulations and drafting practice. Three-wide passes and aggressive dicing was observed.

Aside from the potential issues regarding the optional Chevy wheel caps, the Chevy teams also were on the track Thursday without the chassis wicker bill. Officials informed the manufacturers that the centerline chassis wicker would be deemed optional. Chevrolet technicians informed their teams to remove them, while Honda kept them on. Meanwhile, some Honda teams were running Thursday with a modified, single-element, rear wing configuration.

- Weather: 69 °F (21 °C), sunny

Top Practice Speeds
Pos	No.	Driver	Team	Engine	Speed
1	22	(France) Simon Pagenaud	Team Penske	Chevrolet	228.793
2	26	(Colombia) Carlos Muñoz	Andretti Autosport	Honda	228.126
3	8	(United States) Sage Karam	Chip Ganassi Racing	Chevrolet	227.683
OFFICIAL REPORT

=== Fast Friday — Friday May 15 ===
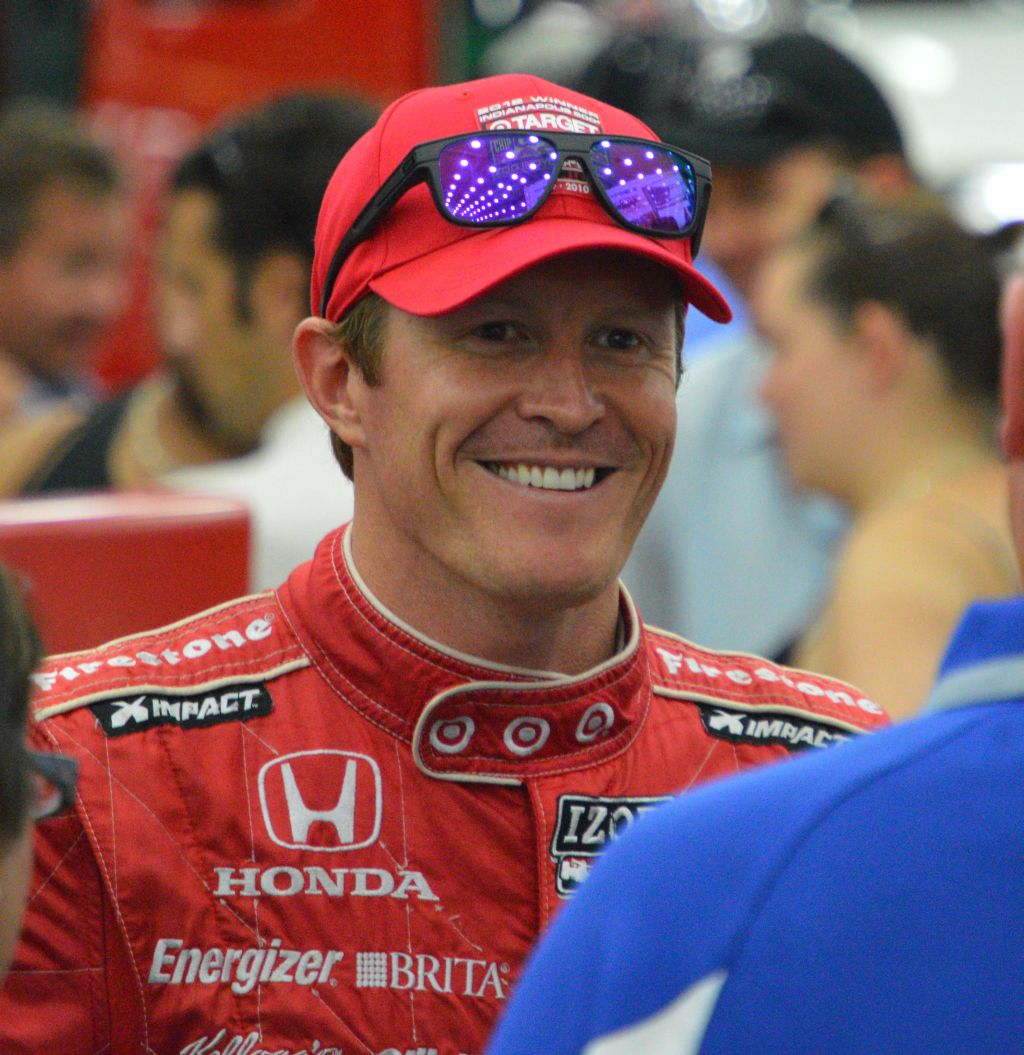
Scott Dixon turned the fastest "no tow" speed for the week.

Simon Pagenaud led the speed chart on "Fast Friday," the final day of practice before qualifications. It was the second day in a row Pagenaud was the top driver of the day, and it was the fastest lap turned thus far of the month. Hot and windy conditions kept the speeds down from expected. Teams were allowed increased turbocharger "boost" for Friday, and Scott Dixon set an early "no tow" speed of 230.655 mph during the first hour. No incidents were reported, however, many cars stayed off the track for most of the afternoon. Only 1,055 laps were completed all day, approximately half of previous days. A total of 33 out of 34 cars completed at least one lap over 225 mph.

- Weather: 82 °F (28 °C), partly cloudy, wind gusts up to 16 mph

Top Practice Speeds
Pos	No.	Driver	Team	Engine	Speed
1	22	(France) Simon Pagenaud	Team Penske	Chevrolet	230.698
2	9	(New Zealand) Scott Dixon	Chip Ganassi Racing	Chevrolet	230.655
3	10	(Brazil) Tony Kanaan	Chip Ganassi Racing	Chevrolet	230.457
OFFICIAL REPORT

== Time trials ==
=== First Day — Saturday May 16 ===
The first day of time trials was scheduled for Saturday May 16. Hélio Castroneves (233.474 mph) turned the fastest lap during the morning practice session, the fastest single lap at the track since 1996. Three cars (Carlos Huertas, Ryan Hunter-Reay, and Scott Dixon) got out onto the track to begin qualifying, but it began to rain during Dixon's run. Dixon had just completed his first lap at 231.357 mph. The rest of the day was washed out, and officials rescheduled time trials for Sunday. The three runs from Saturday were erased.

- Weather: 71 °F (22 °C), overcast and rain

Saturday, May 16, 2015
Pos.	No.	Driver	Team	Engine	Speed	Notes
1	28	(United States) Ryan Hunter-Reay	Andretti Autosport	Honda	229.845	Attempt erased
2	18	(Colombia) Carlos Huertas	Dale Coyne Racing	Honda	228.235	Attempt erased
3	9	(New Zealand) Scott Dixon	Chip Ganassi Racing	Chevrolet	Incomplete	Attempt erased

=== Second Day — Sunday May 17 ===
The second day of time trials was scheduled for Sunday May 17. After the rainout on Saturday, originally, the schedule for Sunday was to include practice, first round qualifying, and the annual Fast Nine Shootout. However, during the morning practice session, Ed Carpenter suffered a serious crash in turn two. The car did a half spin and hit the outside wall at the exit of turn two. Sliding backwards, the car flipped over, and slid to a stop upside-down. It was the third blowover crash by a Chevrolet for the week. Series officials postponed qualifying, and huddled with participants to address safety concerns. After a lengthy delay, rules were tweaked for qualifying. Cars were required to qualify in race trim, and the increased turbocharger "boost" for qualifying was eliminated. Each car would get one attempt, and the Fast Nine Shootout was scrapped. Time permitting, there would be a final row "shootout" amongst the four slowest cars to determine positions 31–33, as well as the lone car to be bumped.

Scott Dixon, who had his Saturday attempt interrupted by rain, was the third car out to qualify. His speed of 226.760 mph wound up being the fastest of the day. It held up all afternoon, as the rest of the field had to qualify in less-than-ideal track conditions. The entire qualifying line was completed without incident.

Due to the last minute rule changes, championship points were not awarded for Indy 500 time trials results as planned. Tristan Vautier qualified the #19 car in substitution for James Davison, a pre-planned arrangement. Davison was racing in the Pirelli World Challenge event at Canadian Tire Motorsport Park the same weekend. Davison was set to take over the car on race day, and per series rules, the car would move to the rear of the field.

- Weather: 79 °F (26 °C), overcast

Sunday, May 17, 2015
Locked-In Qualifiers: Positions 1–30
Pos.	No.	Driver	Team	Engine	Speed
1	9	(New Zealand) Scott Dixon	Chip Ganassi Racing	Chevrolet	226.760
2	1	(Australia) Will Power	Team Penske	Chevrolet	226.350
3	22	(France) Simon Pagenaud	Team Penske	Chevrolet	226.145
4	10	(Brazil) Tony Kanaan	Chip Ganassi Racing	Chevrolet	225.503
5	3	(Brazil) Hélio Castroneves	Team Penske	Chevrolet	225.502
6	25	(United Kingdom) Justin Wilson	Andretti Autosport	Honda	225.279
7	11	(France) Sébastien Bourdais	KV Racing Technology	Chevrolet	225.193
8	27	(United States) Marco Andretti	Andretti Autosport	Honda	225.189
9	21	(United States) Josef Newgarden	CFH Racing	Chevrolet	225.187
10	6	(United States) J. R. Hildebrand	CFH Racing	Chevrolet	225.099
11	26	(Colombia) Carlos Muñoz	Andretti Autosport	Honda	225.042
12	20	(United States) Ed Carpenter	CFH Racing	Chevrolet	224.883
13	32	(Spain) Oriol Servià	Rahal Letterman Lanigan Racing	Honda	224.777
14	83	(United States) Charlie Kimball	Chip Ganassi Racing	Chevrolet	224.743
15	2	(Colombia) Juan Pablo Montoya	Team Penske	Chevrolet	224.657
16	28	(United States) Ryan Hunter-Reay	Andretti Autosport	Honda	224.573
17	15	(United States) Graham Rahal	Rahal Letterman Lanigan Racing	Honda	224.290
18	18	(Colombia) Carlos Huertas	Dale Coyne Racing	Honda	224.233
19	29	(Switzerland) Simona de Silvestro	Andretti Autosport	Honda	223.838
20	7	(United Kingdom) James Jakes	Schmidt Peterson Motorsports	Honda	223.790
21	19	(France) Tristan Vautier	Dale Coyne Racing	Honda	223.747
22	48	(Canada) Alex Tagliani	A. J. Foyt Enterprises	Honda	223.722
23	8	(United States) Sage Karam	Chip Ganassi Racing	Chevrolet	223.595
24	5	(Canada) James Hinchcliffe	Schmidt Peterson Motorsports	Honda	223.519
25	43	(United States) Conor Daly	Schmidt Peterson Motorsports	Honda	223.482
26	24	(United States) Townsend Bell	Dreyer & Reinbold Kingdom Racing	Chevrolet	223.447
27	14	(Japan) Takuma Sato	A. J. Foyt Enterprises	Honda	223.226
28	63	(United Kingdom) Pippa Mann	Dale Coyne Racing	Honda	223.104
29	98	(Colombia) Gabby Chaves R	Bryan Herta Autosport	Honda	222.916
30	17	(Colombia) Sebastián Saavedra	Chip Ganassi Racing	Chevrolet	222.898
Non-Locked-In Qualifiers: Positions 31–33
31	41	(United Kingdom) Jack Hawksworth	A. J. Foyt Enterprises	Honda	222.787
32	4	(Monaco) Stefano Coletti R	KV Racing Technology	Chevrolet	221.912
33	88	(United States) Bryan Clauson	Jonathan Byrd's Racing	Chevrolet	220.523
Failed to qualify
—	91	(United States) Buddy Lazier (W)	Lazier Partners Racing	Chevrolet	No attempt
OFFICIAL REPORT

==== Last row shootout ====
Four cars participated in a 45-minute "shootout" for the final three positions. Jack Hawksworth and KVSH Racing teammates Stefano Coletti, and Bryan Clauson completed runs, filling the field. Buddy Lazier, who was not able to make an attempt during the first round, was the only other car eligible. Because of INDYCAR rules, Lazier had limited practice laps for the month, and his first attempt was well short at 219.438 mph. The team made some drastic wing adjustments, and scrambled to get the car to the qualifying line in the final minutes. His second attempt was faster, but still shy of bumping his way into the field.

Locked-In Qualifiers: Positions 31–33
Pos.	No.	Driver	Team	Engine	Speed
31	41	(United Kingdom) Jack Hawksworth	A. J. Foyt Enterprises	Honda	223.738
32	4	(Monaco) Stefano Coletti R	KV Racing Technology	Chevrolet	222.001
33	88	(United States) Bryan Clauson	Jonathan Byrd's Racing	Chevrolet	221.358
Failed to qualify
—	91	(United States) Buddy Lazier W	Lazier Partners Racing	Chevrolet	220.153

== Post-qualifying practice ==
=== Monday May 18 ===
A post-qualifying practice session was scheduled for Monday May 18 from 12:30 p.m. until 4:00 p.m. Also on-track was the Indy Lights, coming off a weekend high-speed oval compatibility test at Chicagoland Speedway. The practice was marred by a major crash at approximately 12:45 p.m. involving James Hinchcliffe. Going into turn three, Hinchcliffe was drafting behind Juan Pablo Montoya. The car suffered a right front suspension failure, and veered into the outside wall. The right side of the car was disintegrated, and the car slid through the north short chute, tilting up on one side, and coming to rest in turn four. Hinchcliffe was awake and alert, but was pinned in the cockpit and needed assistance from the car. One of the suspension pieces had penetrated the cockpit tub, and punctured Hinchcliffe's thigh, causing profuse bleeding. He was taken to Methodist Hospital for surgery, and the quick response work by IndyCar safety crews was credited in likely saving his life. The track was closed while series officials made repairs to the SAFER Barrier, and investigated the cause of the crash. Up to the time of the crash, Simon Pagenaud (225.260 mph) had turned the fastest lap.

The schedule for the day was retooled, with Indy Lights practice moved up, and a second IndyCar practice session scheduled for two hours beginning at 4 p.m. Sage Karam (227.831 mph) set the fastest lap of the second session and overall for the day. The only other incident of the day belonged to Jack Hawksworth, who had an engine failure.

- Weather: 79 °F (26 °C), overcast

Top Practice Speeds
Pos	No.	Driver	Team	Engine	Speed
1	8	(United States) Sage Karam	Chip Ganassi Racing	Chevrolet	227.831
2	9	(New Zealand) Scott Dixon	Chip Ganassi Racing	Chevrolet	226.542
3	6	(United States) J. R. Hildebrand	CFH Racing	Chevrolet	226.308
OFFICIAL REPORT

=== Special Test - Thursday May 21 ===
With James Hinchcliffe out for the season due to his injuries, veteran Ryan Briscoe was named as his replacement for the #5 car. Briscoe (a full-time driver in 2014) had not driven any laps during the month thus far, and also had not yet driven an Indy car outfitted with the 2015 aero kits. IndyCar officials arranged a for one-hour test session for Briscoe to pass his refresher test and acclimate himself with the new aerodynamic specifications.

=== Carb Day — Friday May 22 ===
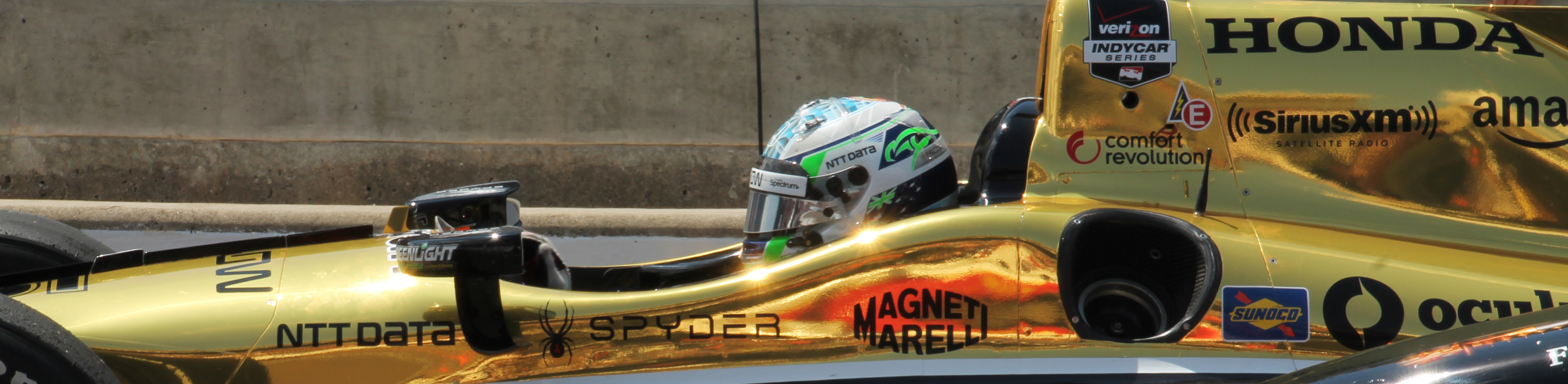
Ryan Briscoe in James Hinchcliffe's #5 IndyCar during the Pit Stop Challenge

Following the James Hinchcliffe crash on Monday, supplemental anti-intrusion plates were made mandatory. The plates, attached to the rear leg of the lower front wishbones at their mounting points, was engineered to reduce the likelihood of the wishbone members piercing the tub of the chassis. In 2025, a second anti-intrusion plates would be added to each side.

Carb Day opened with the news that Carlos Huertas had not been medically cleared to race due to an inner ear condition. Tristan Vautier was named to replace him in the #18 car and the car was moved to the rear of the grid for race day. Vautier had driven in a substitution role for James Davison during time trials, but was scheduled to fly to Silverstone for an endurance race. Vautier was at O'Hare International Airport in Chicago waiting for his plane to England when he got a telephone call to return to Indianapolis.

The Carb Day practice session saw Will Power set the fastest lap of the day with a lap of 229.020 mph. No major incidents occurred during this session.

- Weather: 75 °F (24 °C), mostly sunny

Top Practice Speeds
Pos	No.	Driver	Team	Engine	Speed
1	1	(Australia) Will Power	Team Penske	Chevrolet	229.020
2	9	(New Zealand) Scott Dixon	Chip Ganassi Racing	Chevrolet	228.585
3	10	(Brazil) Tony Kanaan	Chip Ganassi Racing	Chevrolet	228.490
OFFICIAL REPORT

==== Pit Stop Challenge ====
The 38th annual TAG Heuer Pit Stop Challenge was held Friday May 22. A total of twelve drivers/teams qualified. The teams of Marco Andretti, Will Power, Scott Dixon, and Ryan Briscoe (subbing for James Hinchcliffe), received first-round byes, and advanced directly to the quarterfinals. Penske Racing with driver Hélio Castroneves defeated Chip Ganassi Racing (Charlie Kimball) in the final round to win the annual tournament. It was Penske's 15th win in the Pit Stop contest, and the sixth win individually for Castroneves, both records.

First Round
48	Alex Tagliani (A. J. Foyt Racing)
41	Jack Hawksworth (A. J. Foyt Racing)	10.237
83	Charlie Kimball (Chip Ganassi Racing)	14.002
14	Takuma Sato (A. J. Foyt Racing)
15	Graham Rahal (Rahal Letterman)	18.000
3	Helio Castroneves (Team Penske)	12.651
7	James Jakes (Schmidt Peterson)	14.000
24	Townsend Bell (Dreyer & Reinbold)	12.145

Quarterfinals
41	Jack Hawksworth (A. J. Foyt Racing)	15.355
27	Marco Andretti (Andretti Autosport)	14.083
83	Charlie Kimball (Chip Ganassi Racing)	12.368
9	Scott Dixon (Chip Ganassi Racing)	13.232
3	Helio Castroneves (Team Penske)	12.631
5	Ryan Briscoe (Schmidt Peterson)	13.614
24	Townsend Bell (Dreyer & Reinbold)	13.336
1	Will Power (Team Penske)	12.755

Semifinals
27	Marco Andretti (Andretti Autosport)	13.501
83	Charlie Kimball (Chip Ganassi Racing)	12.636
3	Helio Castroneves (Team Penske)	12.731
1	Will Power (Team Penske)	12.891

Finals
83	Charlie Kimball (Chip Ganassi Racing)	13.017
3	Helio Castroneves (Team Penske)	12.561

== Starting grid ==
(R) = Indianapolis 500 rookie; (W) = Former Indianapolis 500 winner

Row	Inside		Middle		Outside	
1	9	(New Zealand) Scott Dixon (W)	1	(Australia) Will Power	22	(France) Simon Pagenaud
2	10	(Brazil) Tony Kanaan (W)	3	(Brazil) Hélio Castroneves (W)	25	(United Kingdom) Justin Wilson
3	11	(France) Sébastien Bourdais	27	(United States) Marco Andretti	21	(United States) Josef Newgarden
4	6	(United States) J. R. Hildebrand	26	(Colombia) Carlos Muñoz	20	(United States) Ed Carpenter
5	32	(Spain) Oriol Servià	83	(United States) Charlie Kimball	2	(Colombia) Juan Pablo Montoya (W)
6	28	(United States) Ryan Hunter-Reay (W)	15	(United States) Graham Rahal	29	(Switzerland) Simona de Silvestro
7	7	(United Kingdom) James Jakes	48	(Canada) Alex Tagliani	8	(United States) Sage Karam
8	43	(United States) Conor Daly	24	(United States) Townsend Bell	14	(Japan) Takuma Sato
9	63	(United Kingdom) Pippa Mann	98	(Colombia) Gabby Chaves (R)	17	(Colombia) Sebastián Saavedra
10	41	(United Kingdom) Jack Hawksworth	4	(Monaco) Stefano Coletti (R)	88	(United States) Bryan Clauson
11	5	(Australia) Ryan Briscoe^{2}	18	(France) Tristan Vautier^{3}	19	(Australia) James Davison^{1}
Cars moved to the rear of the field are ordered by entrant points.

Post-qualifying changes

^{1} Tristan Vautier qualified the #19 car for James Davison, as Davison was racing in the Pirelli World Challenge at Canadian Tire Motorsport Park over qualifying weekend. Per race rules, the car, which had originally qualified for the 21st starting position, was moved to the rear of the field.

^{2} James Hinchcliffe qualified the original #5 car in 24th, but was injured in the ensuing day's practice session. Schmidt Peterson Motorsports named Ryan Briscoe to replace Hinchcliffe. A backup car was utilized, and Briscoe was moved to the rear of the field.

^{3} Carlos Huertas qualified the #18 car but was diagnosed with an ear infection and was not medically cleared to race. Tristan Vautier was named to replace Huertas, and was moved to the rear of the field.

== Race ==
Clear skies and warm temperatures were seen on race day. As the field pulled away for parade laps, Alex Tagliani remained stationary with issues getting the car into gear. The problem was eventually resolved and Tagliani resumed his spot in the starting lineup.

As the field continued the parade laps, fire erupted from underneath the car of Conor Daly. Daly pulled the car to a stop at the North short chute, his day was done before the race even began.

=== First half ===
==== Start ====
Scott Dixon led the field into turn one. As the field rounded turn one, the first incident of the day occurred when Sage Karam squeezed Takuma Sato into the turn 1 wall. Ryan Briscoe also spun trying to avoid the incident. Karam was out of the race, while Sato and Briscoe were able to effect repairs and continue.

Under caution, behind the pace car, as the field came around for the restart on lap 7, Simona de Silvestro rear-ended Juan Pablo Montoya, damaging de Silvestro's left-front wing and Montoya's right-rear bumper, which detached just before Montoya entered pit lane for repairs, causing an extended caution period to clear the debris. After two more restart attempts, the race finally went green on lap 13. The race became a three-way battle for the lead between Scott Dixon, Tony Kanaan, and Simon Pagenaud, with the three swapping the lead regularly. The first round of green flag pit stops briefly promoted Montoya, who had refueled during his stop for repairs, into the lead. When he pitted, Dixon resumed the lead.

==== Second quarter ====
The second caution of the race came on lap 64, when Bryan Clauson drifted wide in turn four and hit the outside barrier. During yellow flag pit stops, Simon Pagenaud was able to jump ahead of the Chip Ganassi Racing teammates and take the lead.

The race restarted on lap 71, and the battle between Pagenaud, Dixon, and Kanaan continued from where it left off. Another round of green flag pit stops came, during which Hélio Castroneves briefly inherited the lead. When stops were cycled through, Pagenaud emerged the leader again.

=== Second half ===
==== Halfway ====
The third caution of the race came on lap 113, when Ed Carpenter clipped Oriol Servià and sent both into the wall in turn one. During this caution, an incident involving all three of the Dale Coyne Racing cars occurred on pit lane. James Davison was released just as his teammate Pippa Mann was passing his pit stall. The two made contact, and Davison slid into the car and crew of his other teammate, Tristan Vautier. Two crew members from Vautier's team were hit, and one suffered a broken ankle. Both Vautier and Davison retired from the race due to the incident.

The race restarted on lap 122, with Will Power joining Pagenaud, Dixon, and Kanaan in the battle for the lead.

==== Fourth quarter ====
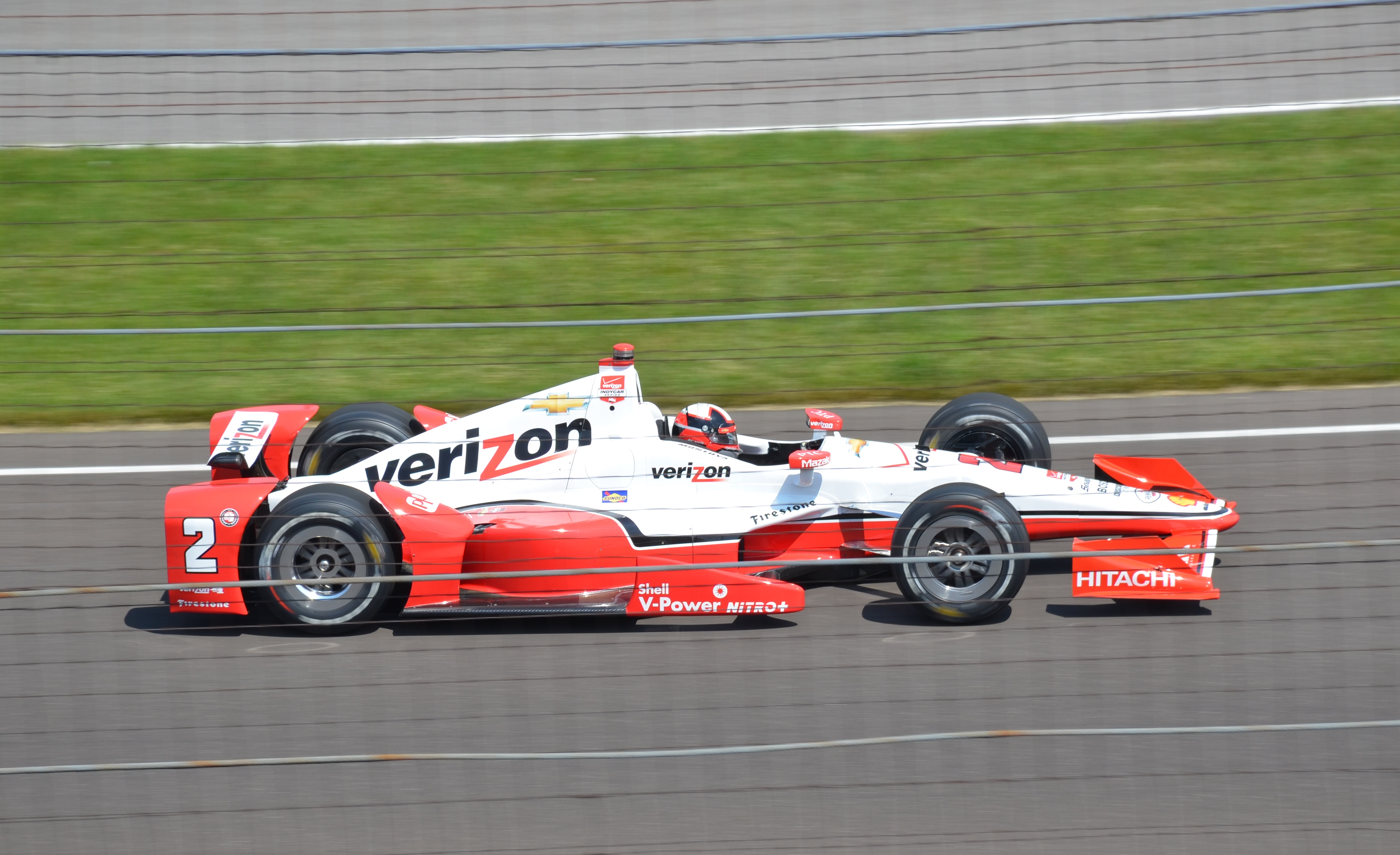
Juan Pablo Montoya

Green flag pit stops again came with roughly 50 laps left in the race. As the pit stop cycle neared completion, the fourth caution of the race came on lap 153 as Tony Kanaan, fresh off a wing adjustment, lost control of his car in turn three and crashed. Alex Tagliani briefly held the lead, but surrendered it to make his pit stop.

The race restarted on lap 160 with Juan Pablo Montoya joining the battle for the lead, having finally recovered from the early race mishap. 7 laps later, the fifth caution of the day came out for a piece of debris that had come off of the car of Takuma Sato. The leaders made their last stops of the race during this caution, with Will Power coming out in front. Andretti Autosport teammates Justin Wilson and Carlos Muñoz elected to stay out during this sequence, with Muñoz inheriting the lead.

The race was restarted on lap 173, with Wilson and Muñoz quickly shuffled back by cars with fresher tires. As the field worked around the Andretti Autosport drivers on lap 176, Simon Pagenaud clipped the rear of Justin Wilson, causing front wing damage to Pagenaud's car and causing him to drop rapidly through the field. Only three turns later, a three-car crash occurred in turn 4 when Jack Hawksworth lost control of his car and hit Sebastián Saavedra from behind. Saavedra's car continued sliding back across the track and into the path of Stefano Coletti, who slammed into the front end of Saavedra's car. Saavedra needed assistance in climbing from his car and was later diagnosed with a foot contusion.

The race was restarted on lap 184 with Power in the lead. The last 13 laps saw the lead exchange hands four times between Dixon, Power and Montoya. With four laps remaining, Montoya slip-streamed around the outside of Power into turn one and took the lead. With clean air, Montoya was able to fend off Power for the remaining three laps and win the second Indianapolis 500 of his career.

== Box score ==
Finish	No.	Driver	Team	Engine/Aero Kit	Laps	Status	Pit Stops	Grid	Points
1	2	(Colombia) Juan Pablo Montoya W	Team Penske	Chevrolet	200	161.341 mph	9	15	101
2	1	(Australia) Will Power	Team Penske	Chevrolet	200	+0.1046	6	2	81
3	83	(United States) Charlie Kimball	Chip Ganassi Racing	Chevrolet	200	+0.795	6	14	71
4	9	(New Zealand) Scott Dixon W	Chip Ganassi Racing	Chevrolet	200	+1.0292	6	1	67
5	15	(United States) Graham Rahal	Rahal Letterman Lanigan Racing	Honda	200	+2.3122	6	17	60
6	27	(United States) Marco Andretti	Andretti Autosport	Honda	200	+2.5388	6	8	56
7	3	(Brazil) Hélio Castroneves W	Team Penske	Chevrolet	200	+2.7821	6	5	53
8	6	(United States) J. R. Hildebrand	CFH Racing	Chevrolet	200	+3.5631	7	10	4
9	21	(United States) Josef Newgarden	CFH Racing	Chevrolet	200	+4.0281	6	9	44
10	22	(France) Simon Pagenaud	Team Penske	Chevrolet	200	+4.2148	7	3	41
11	11	(France) Sébastien Bourdais	KVSH Racing	Chevrolet	200	+5.3067	6	7	38
12	5	(Australia) Ryan Briscoe	Schmidt Peterson Motorsports	Honda	200	+5.6687	7	31	36
13	14	(Japan) Takuma Sato	A. J. Foyt Enterprises	Honda	200	+6.1678	10	24	34
14	24	(United States) Townsend Bell	Dreyer & Reinbold Kingdom Racing	Chevrolet	200	+8.5005	6	23	32
15	28	(United States) Ryan Hunter-Reay W	Andretti Autosport	Honda	200	+9.6481	6	16	30
16	98	(Colombia) Gabby Chaves R	Bryan Herta Autosport	Honda	200	+10.1016	6	26	28
17	48	(Canada) Alex Tagliani	A. J. Foyt Enterprises	Honda	200	+11.2151	7	20	27
18	7	(United Kingdom) James Jakes	Schmidt Peterson Motorsports	Honda	200	+12.0431	8	19	24
19	29	(Switzerland) Simona de Silvestro	Andretti Autosport	Honda	200	+12.7328	8	18	22
20	26	(Colombia) Carlos Muñoz	Andretti Autosport	Honda	200	+39.8346	8	11	21
21	25	(United Kingdom) Justin Wilson	Andretti Autosport	Honda	199	-1 Lap	8	6	19
22	63	(United Kingdom) Pippa Mann	Dale Coyne Racing	Honda	197	-3 Laps	11	25	16
23	17	(Colombia) Sebastián Saavedra	Chip Ganassi Racing	Chevrolet	175	Crash T4	6	27	14
24	41	(United Kingdom) Jack Hawksworth	A. J. Foyt Enterprises	Honda	175	Crash T4	7	28	12
25	4	(Monaco) Stefano Coletti R	KVSH Racing	Chevrolet	175	Crash T4	7	29	10
26	10	(Brazil) Tony Kanaan W	Chip Ganassi Racing	Chevrolet	151	Crash T4	5	4	11
27	19	(Australia) James Davison	Dale Coyne Racing	Honda	116	Crash damage	3	33	10
28	18	(France) Tristan Vautier	Dale Coyne Racing	Honda	116	Crash damage	3	32	10
29	32	(Spain) Oriol Servià	Rahal Letterman Lanigan Racing	Honda	112	Crash T1	3	13	10
30	20	(United States) Ed Carpenter	CFH Racing	Chevrolet	112	Crash T1	3	12	10
31	88	(United States) Bryan Clauson	Jonathan Byrd's Racing	Chevrolet	61	Crash T4	2	30	10
32	8	(United States) Sage Karam	Chip Ganassi Racing	Chevrolet	0	Crash T1	0	21	10
33	43	(United States) Conor Daly	Schmidt Peterson Motorsports	Honda	0	Exhaust	0	22	10
OFFICIAL BOX SCORE

W Former Indianapolis 500 winner

R Indianapolis 500 Rookie

All entrants utilized Firestone tires.

=== Race statistics ===
Lap Leaders
Laps	Leader
1–18	Scott Dixon
19–20	Tony Kanaan
21	Scott Dixon
22–25	Tony Kanaan
26–34	Scott Dixon
35–36	Simon Pagenaud
37–38	Will Power
39–40	Juan Pablo Montoya
41–66	Scott Dixon
67–70	Simon Pagenaud
71	Scott Dixon
72	Simon Pagenaud
73–74	Tony Kanaan
75	Scott Dixon
76–97	Tony Kanaan
98–99	Simon Pagenaud
100–101	Hélio Castroneves
102–123	Simon Pagenaud
124	Will Power
125	Simon Pagenaud
126–127	Scott Dixon
128	Simon Pagenaud
129–148	Scott Dixon
149–150	Simon Pagenaud
151–152	Charlie Kimball
153–154	Alex Tagliani
155–162	Charlie Kimball
163–164	Scott Dixon
165–166	Juan Pablo Montoya
167–169	Scott Dixon
170–172	Carlos Muñoz
173–174	Justin Wilson
175–186	Will Power
187	Scott Dixon
188–191	Will Power
192	Juan Pablo Montoya
193–196	Will Power
197–200	Juan Pablo Montoya

Total laps led
Driver	Laps
Scott Dixon	84
Simon Pagenaud	35
Tony Kanaan	30
Will Power	23
Charlie Kimball	10
Juan Pablo Montoya	9
Carlos Muñoz	3
Alex Tagliani	2
Hélio Castroneves	2
Justin Wilson	2

Cautions: 6 for 47 laps
Laps	Reason
1–11	Karam, Sato, Davison, Briscoe crash in turn 1
64–69	Bryan Clauson crash in turn 4
113–122	Carpenter, Servià crash in turn 1
153–158	Tony Kanaan crash in turn 4
168–172	Debris
176–184	Coletti, Saavedra, Hawksworth crash in turn 4

== Championship standings after the race ==
Drivers' Championship standings

	Pos	Driver	Points
	1	(Colombia) Juan Pablo Montoya	272
	2	(Australia) Will Power	247
1	3	(New Zealand) Scott Dixon	211
1	4	(Brazil) Hélio Castroneves	211
	5	(United States) Graham Rahal	204

Manufacturer standings

Pos	Manufacturer	Points
1	(United States) Chevrolet	588
2	(Japan) Honda	553

- Note: Only the top five positions are included.

== Broadcasting ==
=== Television ===
The Grand Prix of Indianapolis and the Indianapolis 500 were broadcast live in the United States on ABC. Allen Bestwick was the anchor for the second year in a row. Jon Beekhuis joined the crew as pit reporter for the first time since 1999.

The Time Trials were originally scheduled to air on ABC. However, due to weather, schedule changes, and ABC's commitment to air a Game 7 NBA playoff game, trials instead aired on ESPNEWS.

Former pit reporters Vince Welch and Jamie Little departed ESPN/ABC for Fox Sports.

The race received a 4.3 overnight rating, tied for the highest since 2008. The fast-national final rating of 4.3 (6.4 million viewers) was a three-year high, and the highest rated and most watched since 2012.

ABC Television
Booth Announcers	Pit/garage reporters
Host: Lindsay Czarniak; Announcer: Allen Bestwick; Color: Scott Goodyear; Color: Eddie Cheever	Jerry Punch; Jon Beekhuis; Rick DeBruhl

In Hispanic America, ESPN Latin America showed the race live.

=== Radio ===
The race was carried live by the Indianapolis Motor Speedway Radio Network, part of the Advanced Auto Parts IndyCar Radio Network. Paul Page was the chief announcer for the full race for the final time as during the 2016 race after the first lap he would hand off the responsibilities as Voice of the 500 to Mark Jaynes. Davey Hamilton was the driver expert. Doug Rice, the anchor of the Performance Racing Network, which distributes the Brickyard 400 radio broadcast produced with the IMS Radio Network, joined the crew as a pit reporter. Rice performed "double duty", working the pits for the Indy 500, then flying to Charlotte Motor Speedway to call the Coca-Cola 600. Dave Wilson, who previously served as a booth analyst, and later a garage area reporter, returned to the booth in 2015 offering commentary as race "statistician."

The pit reporters split their duties with Nick Yeoman and Michael Young reporting from the south end of the pit area. Dave Furst reported from the center pits, and during the second half of the race, also reported from the garage area and medical center. Kevin Lee reported from the north-center pits, then in the latter stages of the race, moved towards the south end to help focus on some of the leaders. Doug Rice was stationed at the north end of the pit area, but focused nearly the entire race on the pit of eventual race winner Juan Pablo Montoya. After the race, Nick Yeoman interviewed the winner in victory lane.

After featuring Paul Page's signature "Delta Force" theme music in 2014, the traditional "The 500" song was reprised for 2015. Among the guests interviewed in the booth was future Vice President of the United States and current Indiana Governor Mike Pence. Sponsor guests included Dan Ammann (GM), Jim Doyle (Panasonic), Dale Herrigle (Firestone), and James Verrier (BorgWarner). The broadcast originated from the "Firestone Broadcast Booth" inside the Pagoda.

1070 The Fan broadcast nightly beginning May 4 with Trackside with Curt Cavin and Kevin Lee, followed by Donald Davidson's The Talk of Gasoline Alley.

Indianapolis Motor Speedway Radio Network
Booth Announcers	Turn Reporters	Pit/garage reporters
Chief Announcer: Paul Page; Driver expert: Davey Hamilton; Historian: Donald Davidson; Statistician: Dave Wilson	Turn 1: Jerry Baker; Turn 2: Jake Query; Turn 3: Mark Jaynes; Turn 4: Chris Denari	Nick Yeoman (south pits); Michael Young (south-center pits); Dave Furst (center pits/garages); Kevin Lee (north-center pits); Doug Rice (north pits)

== Footnotes ==
=== Works cited ===
- IndyCar.com
- IndyStar.com
- WFNI 1070 The Fan
- Weather.com – Speedway, Indiana

=== References ===
Previous race: 2015 Grand Prix of Indianapolis	IndyCar Series; 2015 season	Next race: 2015 Chevrolet Detroit Belle Isle Grand Prix
Previous race: 2014 Indianapolis 500	Indianapolis 500	Next race: 2016 Indianapolis 500
