= Denver tool =

Multi-purpose tool used to gain forcible entry to buildings

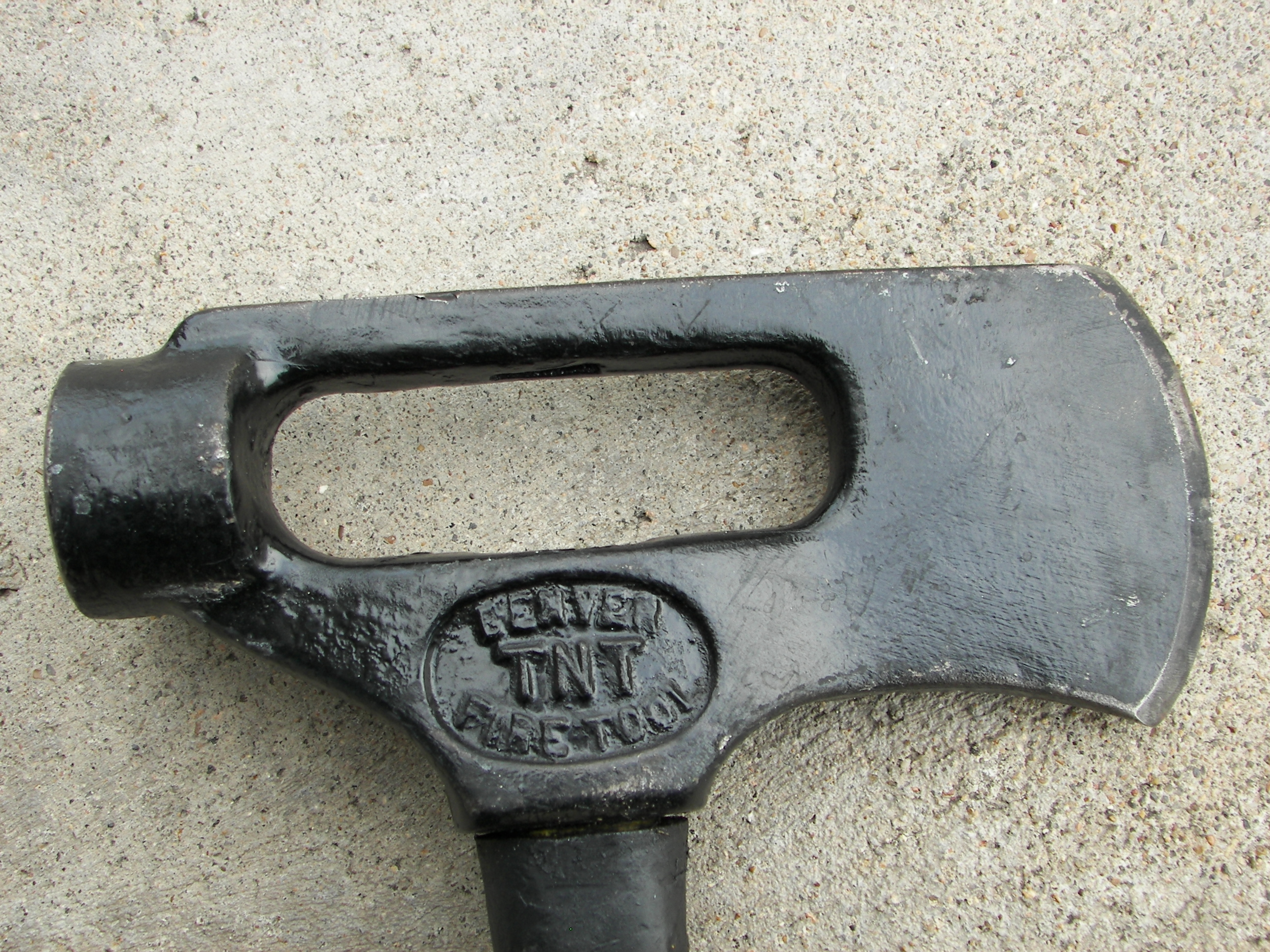
The head of a Denver Tool.

The TNT Tool (or Denver Tool as it was formerly known) is a multi-purpose tool used by firefighters, emergency personnel, and law enforcement officers to gain forcible entry to buildings, automobiles, etc. during emergency situations. It is a combination axe, sledgehammer, pry tool, ram, and D-handle pull tool.

== See also ==
- Glossary of firefighting equipment
- Halligan bar
- K-tool
