= Claw tool =

Forcible entry tool used by firefighters

The claw tool (also known as the Hayward Claw Tool) is a forcible entry tool used by firefighters, made of steel, that has a hook on one end and a forked end on the other. The tool was a major component in the Fire Department of New York during the early 20th century. Over the last fifty years, the claw tool has lost prominence due to the advent of newer and more efficient forcible entry tools.

== History ==
The exact origin of the claw tool, which later became the Halligan bar, is not well documented, but according to FDNY folklore, it was discovered by firefighters responding to a fire at a lower Manhattan bank. The fire was started to cover up a burglary, and during the investigation, firefighters found an unusual tool with a claw-like end that the burglars had used to break into the bank. The firefighters believed that if the tool was good enough to break into a bank, it was good enough for their use, so they labeled it the "claw tool" and reproduced it many times over. It became the primary forcible entry tool used by the FDNY and is thought to be the first tool designed solely for that purpose. FDNY Deputy Chief Hugh Halligan later incorporated the fork end of the claw tool into his design of the Halligan bar in 1948.

== Design and use ==
The original claw tool weighed 12 pounds and was approximately 36 inches in length. It was designed with a claw on one end and a tapered fork on the other end.

== See also ==
- Halligan bar
- Kelly tool
