= Set of irons =

Set of irons can refer to:

- a set of iron (golf) clubs
- Fetters
- a "married set" used by firefighters, consisting of a halligan bar and a flathead axe
