= New York roof hook =

Firefighting tool

The New York roof hook (or halligan hook) is a firefighting tool used mostly for rooftop operations including vertical and horizontal ventilation, pulling and prying.

Developed in the 1940s by FDNY Deputy Chief Hugh Halligan, a prolific firefighting inventor who also designed the Halligan bar, the tool is composed of a 6-foot (1.8 m) long shaft with two triangular-shaped ends jutting in opposite directions. One is angled at 45 degrees, the other at 90 degrees.

== See also ==
- Pike pole
