= K-tool =

Device for forcibly removing a cylinder lock

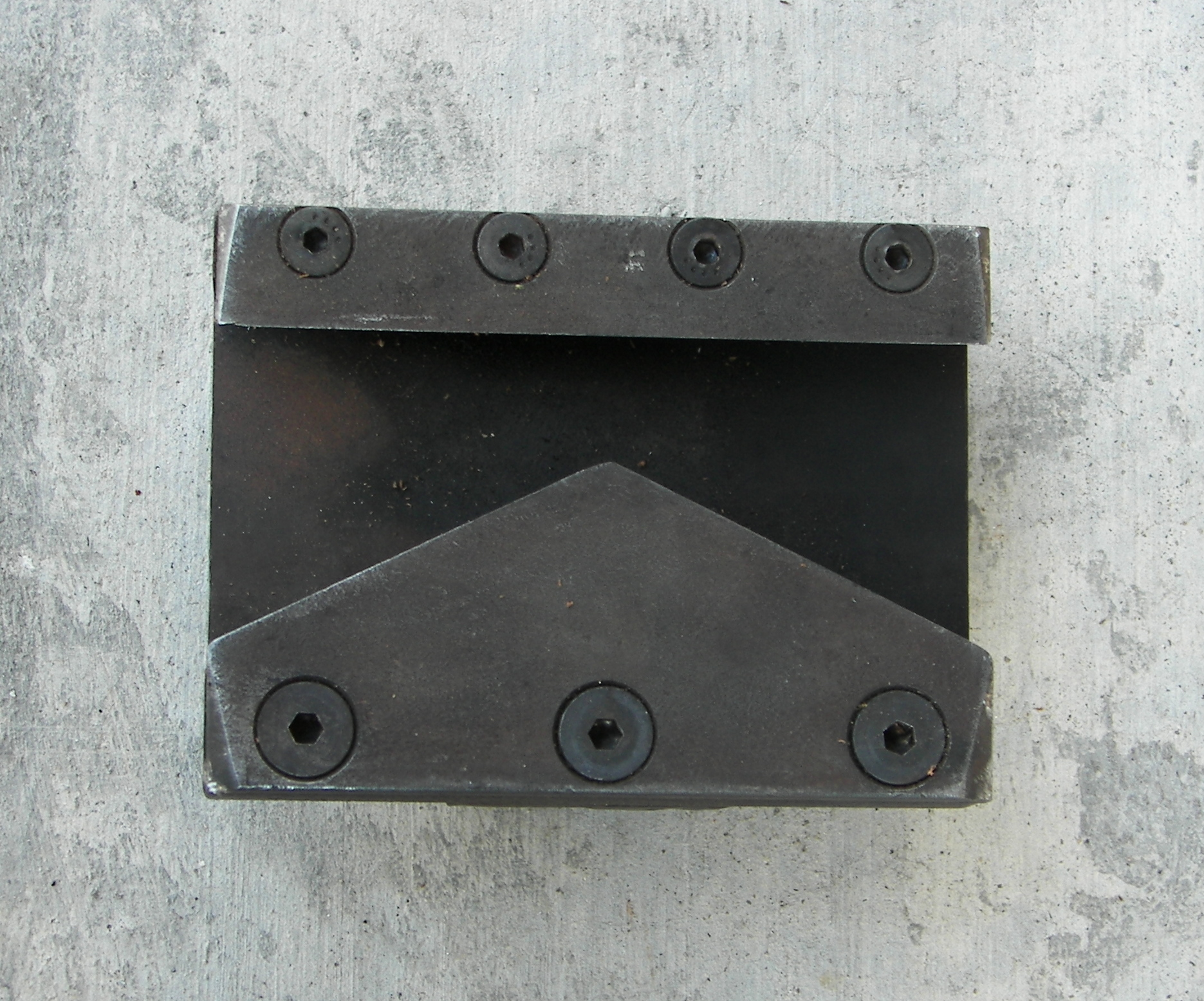
K-Tool

The K-tool, also known as a "K-spreader" or a "K-tool spreader," is a specialized forcible entry tool used by firefighters to gain access to buildings or other structures in emergency situations. It is named for its distinctive "K" shape, which allows it to be used for a variety of purposes. It is used in conjunction with a Halligan bar and a flat-headed axe or maul (commonly referred to as "irons" or (with a maul instead of an axe) "heavy irons") to remove a cylinder lock with a protruding cylinder. It consists of a steel block roughly 3 inches by 3 inches by 1 inch thick with a K-shaped notch on one side, having sharp edges that grip the end of the cylinder, and a socket to fit the adze of the halligan bar on the other side. The notch is slipped over the lock cylinder, then forced down by striking with the flat side of the axe or maul. The cylinder is forced into the angle of the notch, between the "leg" and "back" of the K. The hard steel bites into the softer metal and provides the needed purchase. The halligan is then inserted into the socket and used to pry the K-tool off the door, thereby pulling the entire key cylinder out. The bolt is then retracted by reaching into the empty cylinder hole with a turning tool, such as a screwdriver.

Some cylinder locks include additional shields (outside and internally) that will make this type of entry more difficult and time-consuming, and there may be additional (non-cylinder) locks to deal with. Flush cylinder locks provide nothing for the K-tool to grab onto.

The K-tool can be used on most styles of door, although it is often faster to use the irons (combination of an axe and halligan tool) or a hydraulic ram on a solid door. The benefit of a K-tool comes where it is impractical or dangerous to break the door, for example, the large plate-glass doors in front of a commercial building will quickly yield to a well-placed blow from an axe, but may send fragments of glass flying, and will result in a pile of broken glass. The K-tool can be used to pull the core from the lock without damaging the door itself. The K-tool is also useful during investigations where no fire is readily evident. The core can be pulled from a lock, which can often be repaired at lower cost than replacing a door and jamb damaged by other, more energetic entry methods.

== See also ==
- Denver tool
- Snap gun
