= Holmatro =

Dutch hydraulic equipment manufacturer

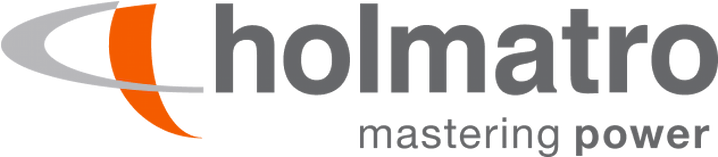

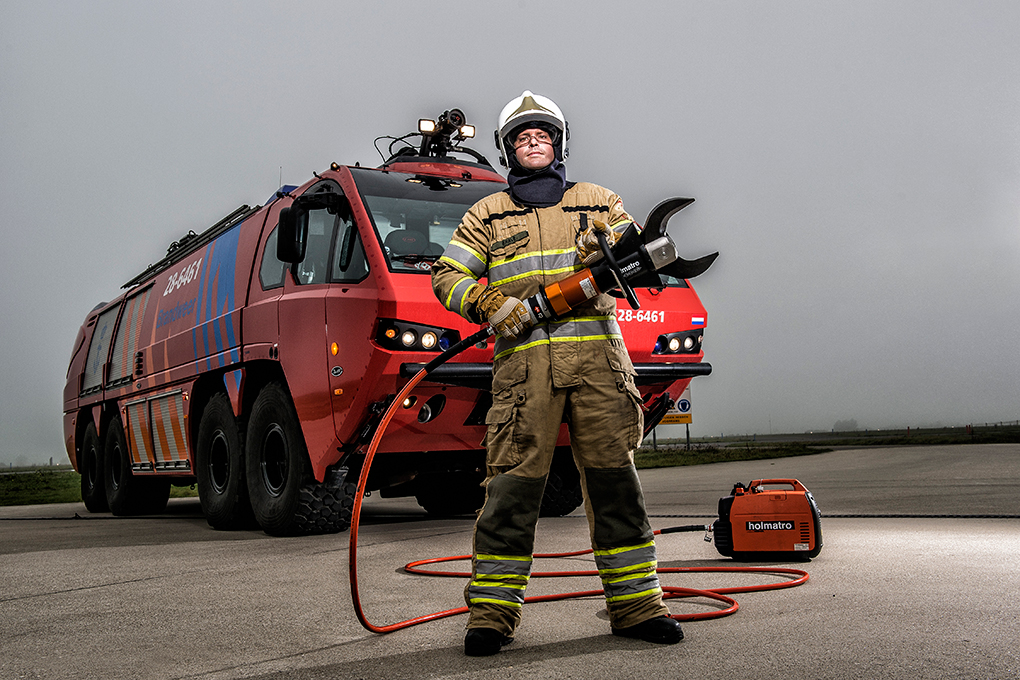
- Firefighter with a Holmatro hydraulic cutter
- Type: Private
- Industry: Industrial equipment
- Founded: Netherlands (1967)
- Headquarters: Raamsdonksveer, Netherlands
- Products: Hydraulic industrial and rescue equipment
- Website: www.holmatro.com

Holmatro is a Dutch multinational manufacturer of hydraulic equipment for industrial and emergency response applications. Headquartered in the Netherlands, it was founded in 1967 to supply hydraulic equipment to the shipbuilding industry. Holmatro has branches in the US and China, as well as a worldwide dealer network. Its American branch, Holmatro USA, began in 1984 as a one-man sales office, followed in 1988 by a manufacturing and distribution facility near Baltimore/Washington International Airport in Glen Burnie, Maryland. At the time, the privately owned company had $15–20 million in worldwide sales and 100 employees.

Between 1996 and 2018, the company had a sponsorship arrangement with the Indianapolis Motor Speedway and IndyCar. The Holmatro Safety Team performed extrication using their rescue tools and included emergency medical treatment personnel for American open-wheel car racing events nationwide. The team, acclaimed for its extrication expertise, travels around the US for every IndyCar race and has demonstrated the techniques used at car racing trade shows. IndyCar racer James Hinchcliffe praised the Holmatro Safety Team for saving his life when he was impaled by his car and severely injured in a horrific crash on May 18, 2015, during an Indianapolis 500 practice run. In the aftermath of the Hinchcliffe crash, IndyCar Track Safety personnel consulted with Holmatro for improved methods to cut through Zylon panels that had made the extrication more difficult, compared to ordinary steel or aluminum car bodies. Since 2018, the IndyCar Safety Team has been sponsored by AMR, although Holmatro continues to provide the Team's rescue tools.

Holmatro's hydraulically powered spreaders and cutters are used by fire rescue services to extricate accident victims quickly from mangled vehicles. Although sometimes colloquially called "jaws of life", that term is a registered trademark of Hurst, a North Carolina–based competitor making similar devices. Automotive manufacturers provide information about the design of their products and materials used to the rescue tool makers. Holmatro, for example, provides a book to fire departments depicting the location of air bag and seat belt tensioners, which can otherwise hamper extrication efforts. The company's representatives conduct demonstrations of their extrication tools for fire departments, using wrecked automobiles provided by insurance companies.
