= Kelly tool =

Tool used by fire and rescue services for forcible entry

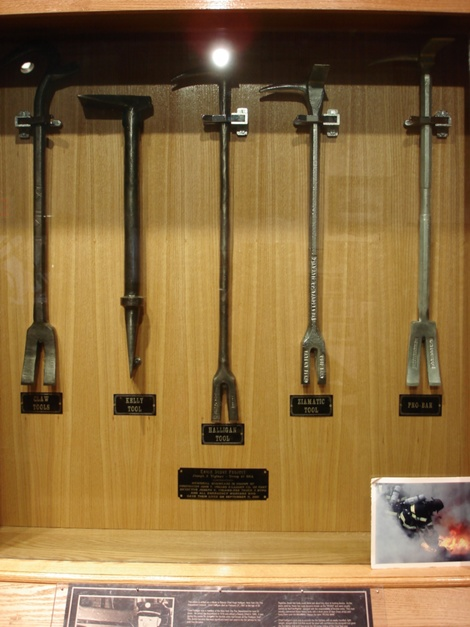
A Kelly Tool in the NYC Fire Museum (2nd from left)

The Kelly tool is a tool used in fire and rescue service for forcible entry and other prying and striking tasks. The predecessor of the Halligan bar, it has largely been superseded by the latter, but still sees some use.

== Design and uses ==
The Kelly tool is named after its designer, Captain John F. Kelly of H&L Company 163 (FDNY). It consists of a straight steel bar, generally about 28 inches long. One end is formed into a chisel; the opposite end has a 90 degree adze. The primary advantage over the claw tool it replaced is that the striking end (the adze) is in a straight line with the rest of the tool; on the claw tool the corresponding end was curved into a hook with no flat surfaces.

The Kelly tool was intended specifically for opening doors and other barriers. Modern versions often are modified along the lines of the Halligan bar, especially at the chisel end. Originally the chisel blade was flat and straight; more recently it has tended to take on a curved and forked form, similar to the claw of a carpenter's hammer. There are similar tools referred to generically as "Kelly tools", but in general they are variations on the original form.
