= Halligan bar =

Forcible entry tool

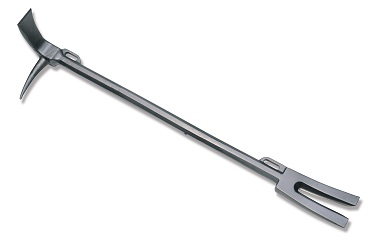
Halligan bar

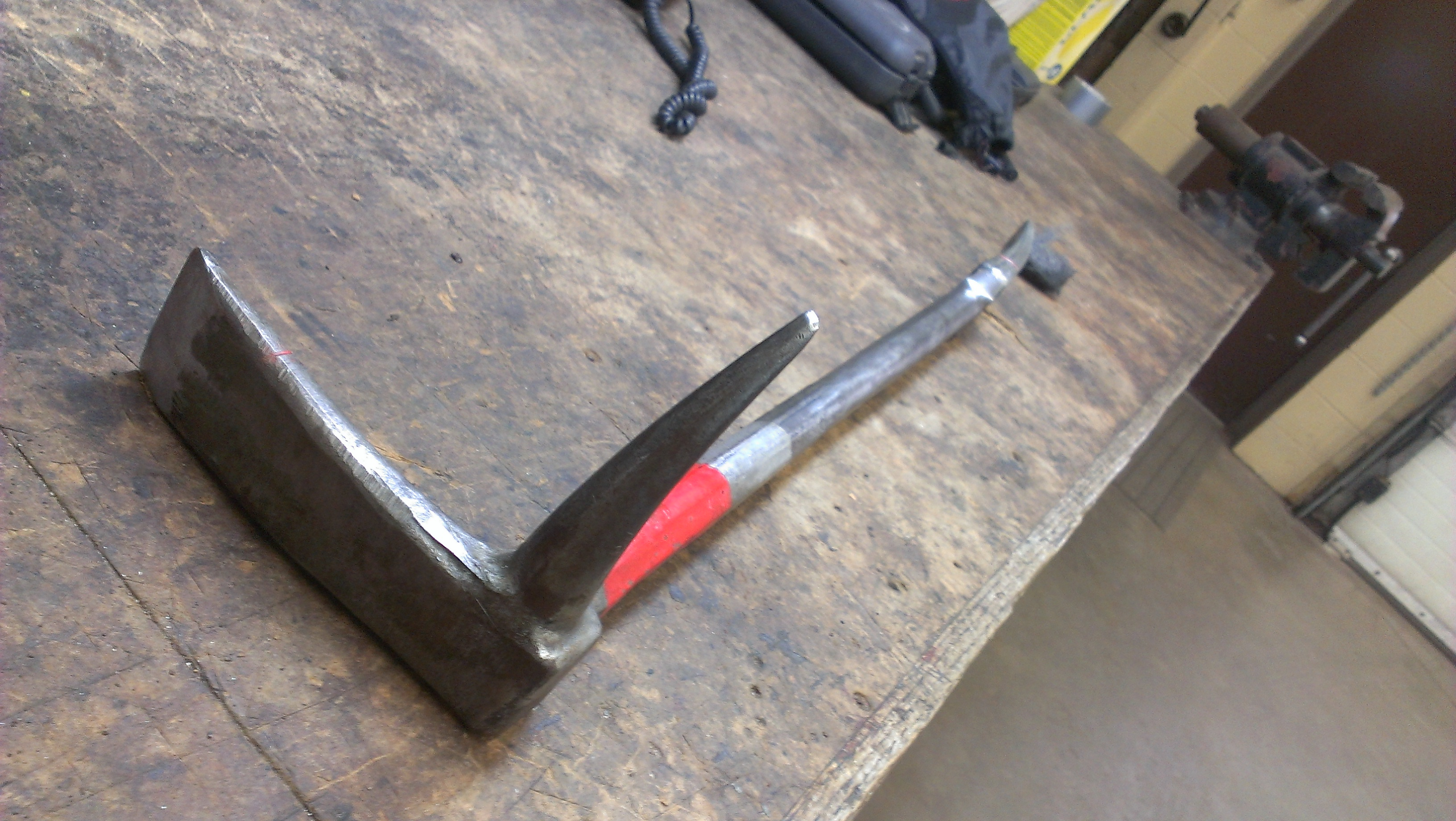
The adze and pick end of a Halligan

A Halligan bar (also known as a Halligan tool or Hooligan tool) is a forcible entry tool used by firefighters.

== History ==
The Halligan bar was designed by New York City Fire Department (FDNY) First Deputy Chief Hugh Halligan in 1948 and was named after him.

"Created by Hugh Halligan, allegedly modeled on a burglar's tool found in the rubble of a bank fire during overhaul operations." — New York City Fire Museum

That same year, blacksmith Peter Clarke made the first prototype of the tool.

"Due to a dispute between the Department and Halligan, the tool was not purchased by the FDNY until the patent expired and the Department was able to buy comparable tools from other vendors. Nonetheless it was widely used; firefighters purchased their own "Halligans" out-of-pocket, a tribute to its effectiveness and dependability. The FDNY now issues a modified Halligan Tool called the "PRO-BAR," manufactured by Fire Hooks Unlimited, for use as the primary forcible entry tool." — New York City Fire Museum

Despite its popularity among FDNY ladder companies, the department initially refrained from purchasing the tool to avoid the appearance of a conflict of interest. However, the Boston Fire Department was the first major customer of the Halligan bar, purchasing one for every fire company in the city. This led to widespread adoption of the tool, first in North America and eventually worldwide. The Halligan bar has become the most versatile hand tool for fireground tasks over the past seven decades.

== Design ==
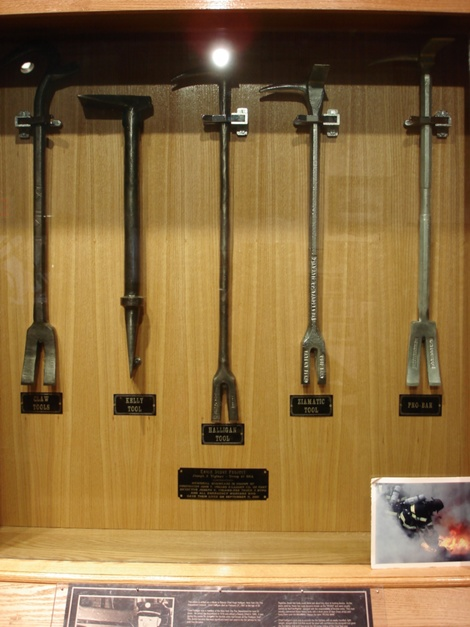
A Halligan tool on display at the NYC Fire Museum (middle), next to the earlier Kelly tool (2nd from left) on which it was based

Based on the earlier Kelly tool, the Halligan is a multipurpose tool for prying, twisting, punching, or striking. It consists of a claw (or fork), a blade (wedge or adze), and a tapered pick, which is especially useful in quickly breaching many types of locked doors.

One variant of the Halligan has a heavy sliding collar on the shaft. Once the prying end of the tool is wedged into position, the sliding "hammer" is used to force the wedge, allowing for proper seating before prying. The adze end is also assisted by using the sliding hammer to generate forced traction on a hooked cylinder. Another variant has an end that resembles a lever-type can opener, used for making large holes for access or ventilation in sheet metal.

The Halligan is available in a number of lengths – typically 18–54 inches (46–137 cm) – and of various materials, including titanium, beryllium copper or stainless steel. Carrying straps or rings can be found. The 18-inch Halligan is often referred to as an officer's tool.

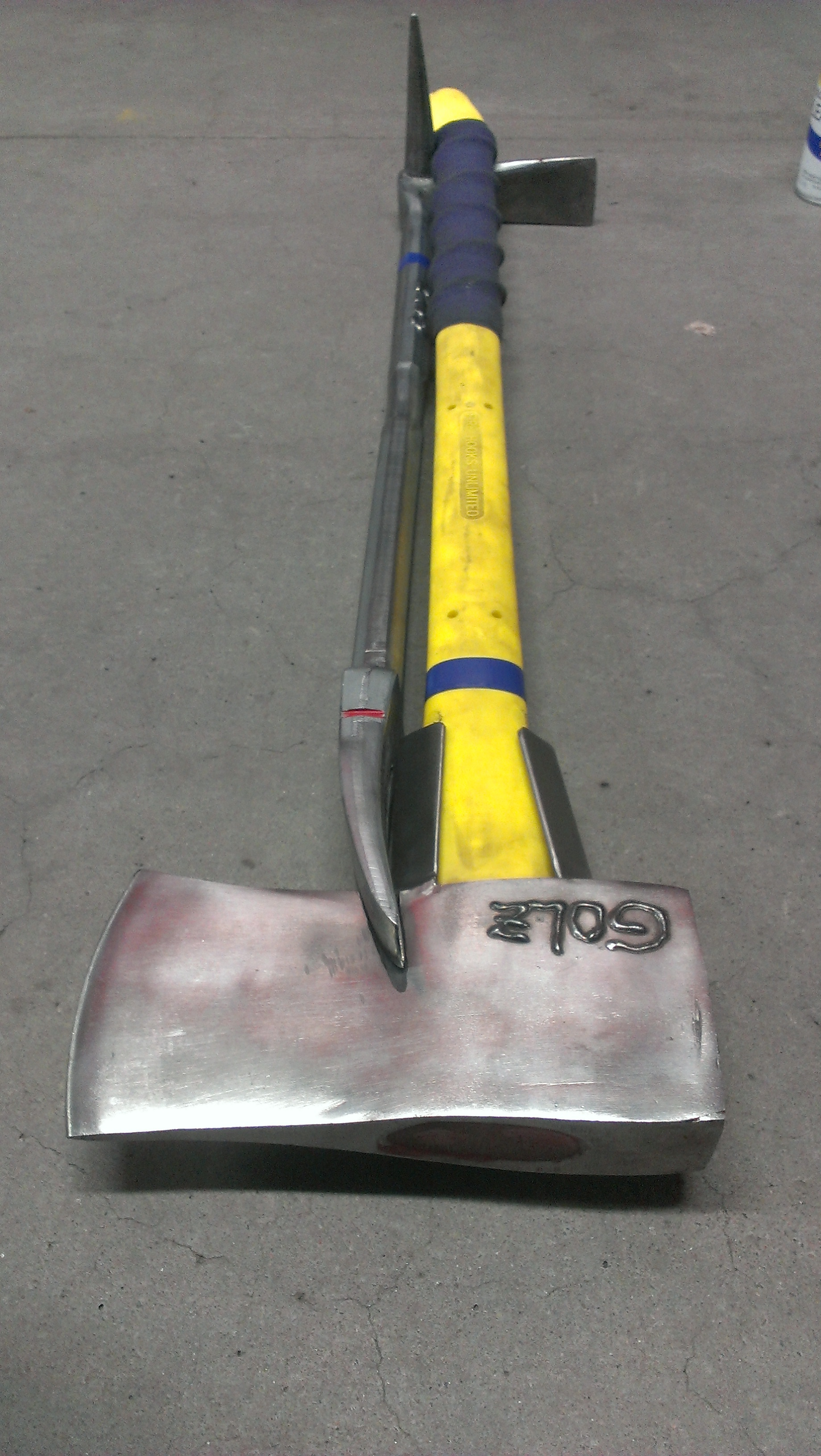
A Halligan and flat head axe. When joined they are known as "the irons"

A Halligan bar and a flathead axe can be joined (and partially interlocked, head-to-toe) to form what is known as a married set, set of irons or simply the irons. This combination of tools is most common within the fire service. However, the Halligan may also be combined with a Halligan hook or sledgehammer as an alternative.

== Uses ==
- Doors and locks
  - Either the adze end or fork end of the tool can be used to break through the latch of a swinging door by forcing the tool between the door and door jamb and prying the two apart, striking it with a sledgehammer or a flat-head axe.
  - The firefighter holding the Halligan can use a "baseball bat swing" to sink the pick into the door frame near the door handle and then force the door by applying pressure to the adze.
  - Another option is to use the Halligan to pry the door off the top hinges. The pick and adze (only when properly used) provide protection to the arms, hands, and body of the holder during forcible entry operation.
  - The pick can be placed into the shackle (or eye) of a padlock or hasp and twisted or pried to break it free.
  - Using a K-tool and the adze end, a lock cylinder can easily be pulled.
- Vehicles
  - The Halligan can be used to make a purchase point on a car hood to cut the battery.
  - The Halligan can also be used for vehicle extrication, among other things.
  - The tool can be used to pry open the hood of a car when it is jammed from an accident.
- The Halligan can be used to knock down a wall in a house to get to another area.
- The point can be used to break glass on a car or building for access or ventilation.
- It can also be driven into a roof to provide a foothold for firefighters engaged in vertical ventilation.
- The fork end is routinely used to shut off gas meter valves.
- The Halligan can be used as a step to get up on a window that is at head level.
- The Halligan can be tied to a rope and act as an anchor in the window frame, for improvised bailout.
- The Halligan can also be used a self-defense weapon.

== See also ==
- Claw tool – Forcible entry tool used by firefighters
- Glass breaker
- Pulaski (tool)
