= Fire hydrant =

Connection point by which firefighters can tap into a water supply

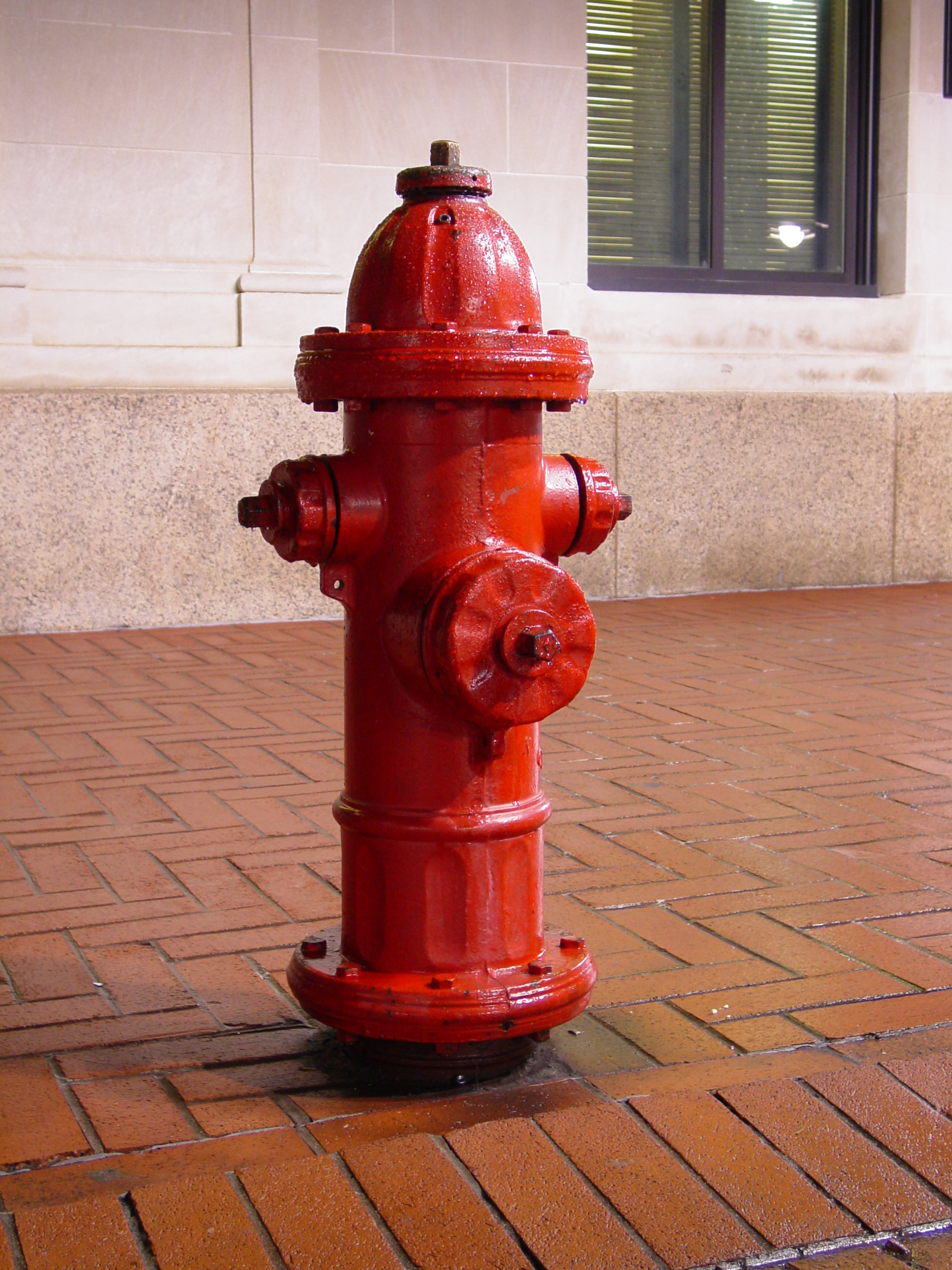
Fire hydrant in Charlottesville, Virginia, United States

A fire hydrant, fireplug, firecock (archaic), hydrant riser or Johnny Pump is a connection point by which firefighters can tap into a water supply. It is a component of active fire protection. Underground fire hydrants have been used in Europe and Asia since at least the 18th century. Above-ground pillar-type hydrants are a 19th-century invention.

== Operation ==
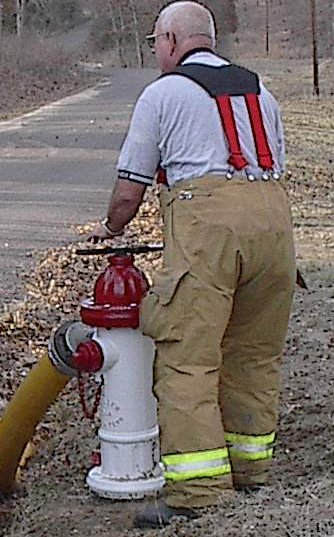
Fireman uses hydrant

The user (most likely a fire department) attaches a hose to the fire hydrant, then opens a valve on the hydrant to provide a powerful flow of water, on the order of 350 kilopascals (51 psi); this pressure varies according to region and depends on various factors (including the size and location of the attached water main). The user can attach this hose to a fire engine, which can use a powerful pump to boost the water pressure and possibly split it into multiple streams. One may connect the hose with a threaded connection, instantaneous "quick connector" or a Storz connector.

If a fire hydrant is opened or closed too quickly, a water hammer can occur and damage nearby pipes and equipment. The water inside a charged hose line causes it to be very heavy, and high-water pressure causes it to be stiff and unable to make a tight turn while pressurized. When a fire hydrant is unobstructed, this is not a problem, as there is enough room to adequately position the hose.

Most fire hydrant valves are not designed to throttle the water flow; they are designed to be operated full-on or full-off. The valving arrangement of most dry-barrel hydrants is for the drain valve to be open at anything other than full operation. Usage at partial opening can consequently result in considerable flow directly into the soil surrounding the hydrant, which, over time, can cause severe scouring. Gate or butterfly valves can be installed directly onto the hydrant opening to control individual outputs and allow for changing equipment connections without turning off the flow to other outlets. These valves can be up to 12 inches (30 cm) in diameter to accommodate the large central "steamer" outlets on many US hydrants. It is good practice to install valves on all outlets before using a hydrant as the protective caps are unreliable and can cause major injury if they fail.

New firefighters are often trained extensively on fire hydrants in the fire academy to be quick and safe while connecting the fire engine to the fire hydrant (usually within one minute). Time is often critical as other firefighters will be waiting for the water supply. When operating a hydrant, a firefighter typically wears appropriate personal protective equipment, such as gloves and a helmet with face shield. High-pressure water coursing through a potentially aging and corroding hydrant could cause a failure, injuring the firefighter operating the hydrant or bystanders.

In most jurisdictions it is illegal to park a car within a certain distance of a fire hydrant. In North America, the distances are commonly 3 to 5 metres (10 to 16 ft), often indicated by yellow or red paint on the curb. The rationale behind these laws is that hydrants need to be visible and accessible in an emergency. In the event that a car is illegally parked next to a fire hydrant when firefighters need access to it, firefighters are legally allowed to break the car's windows to run the hose through it, while the car owner receives a parking citation.

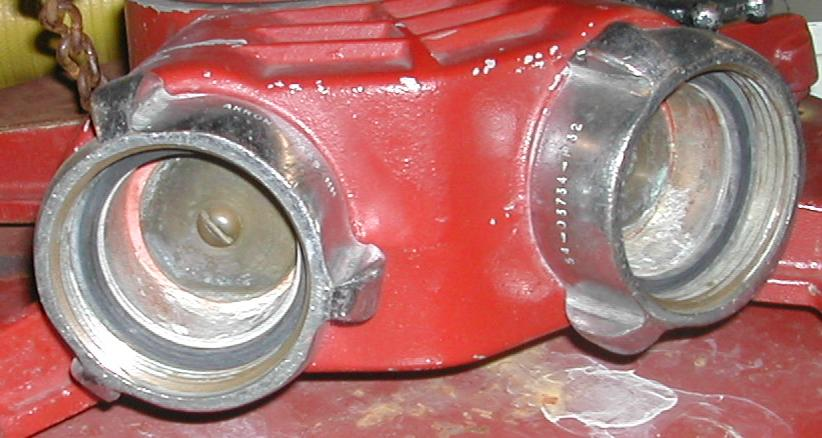
Clapper valve

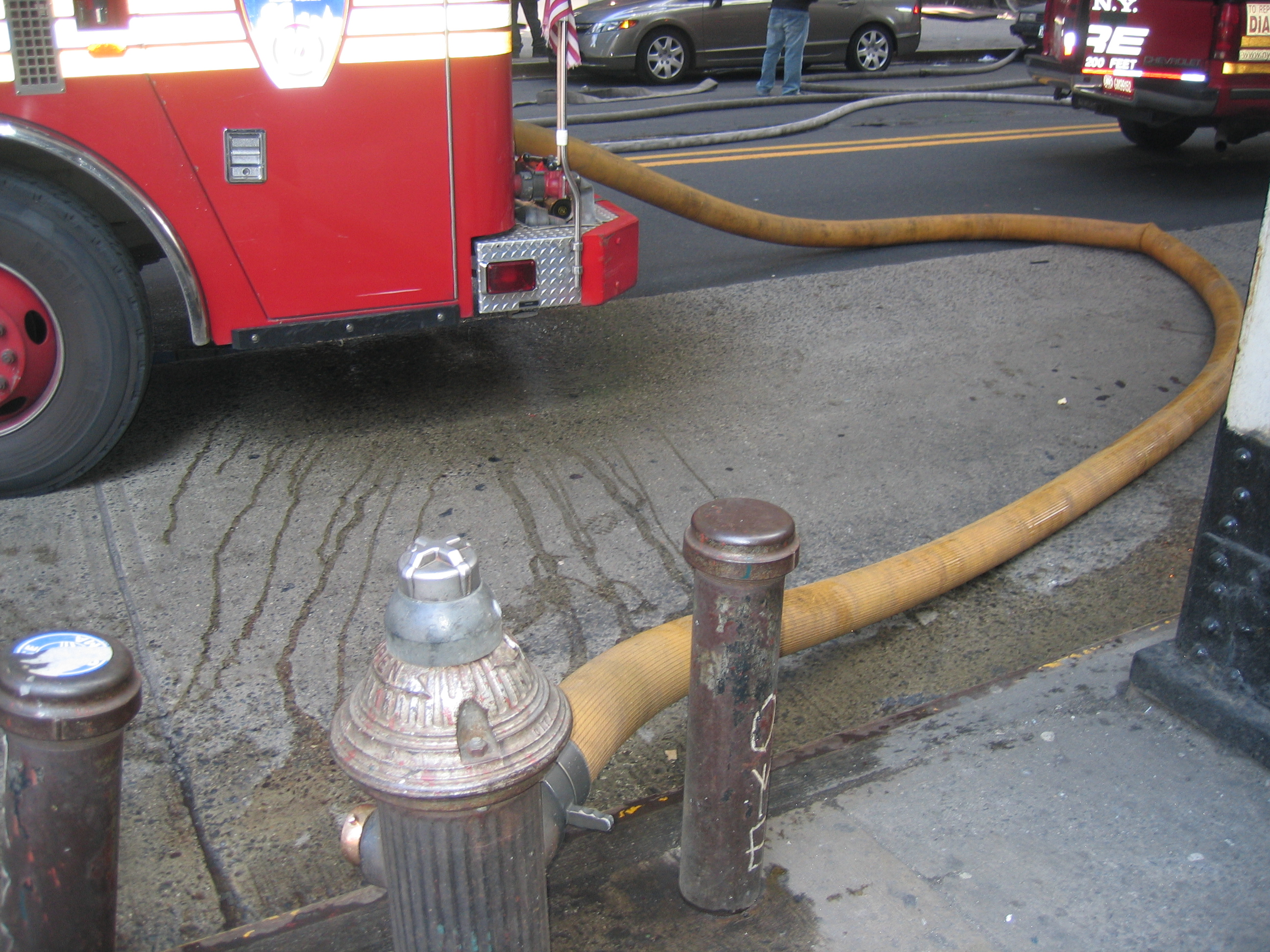
A New York City hydrant hooked to an FDNY fire engine with a fire hose actively pumping water

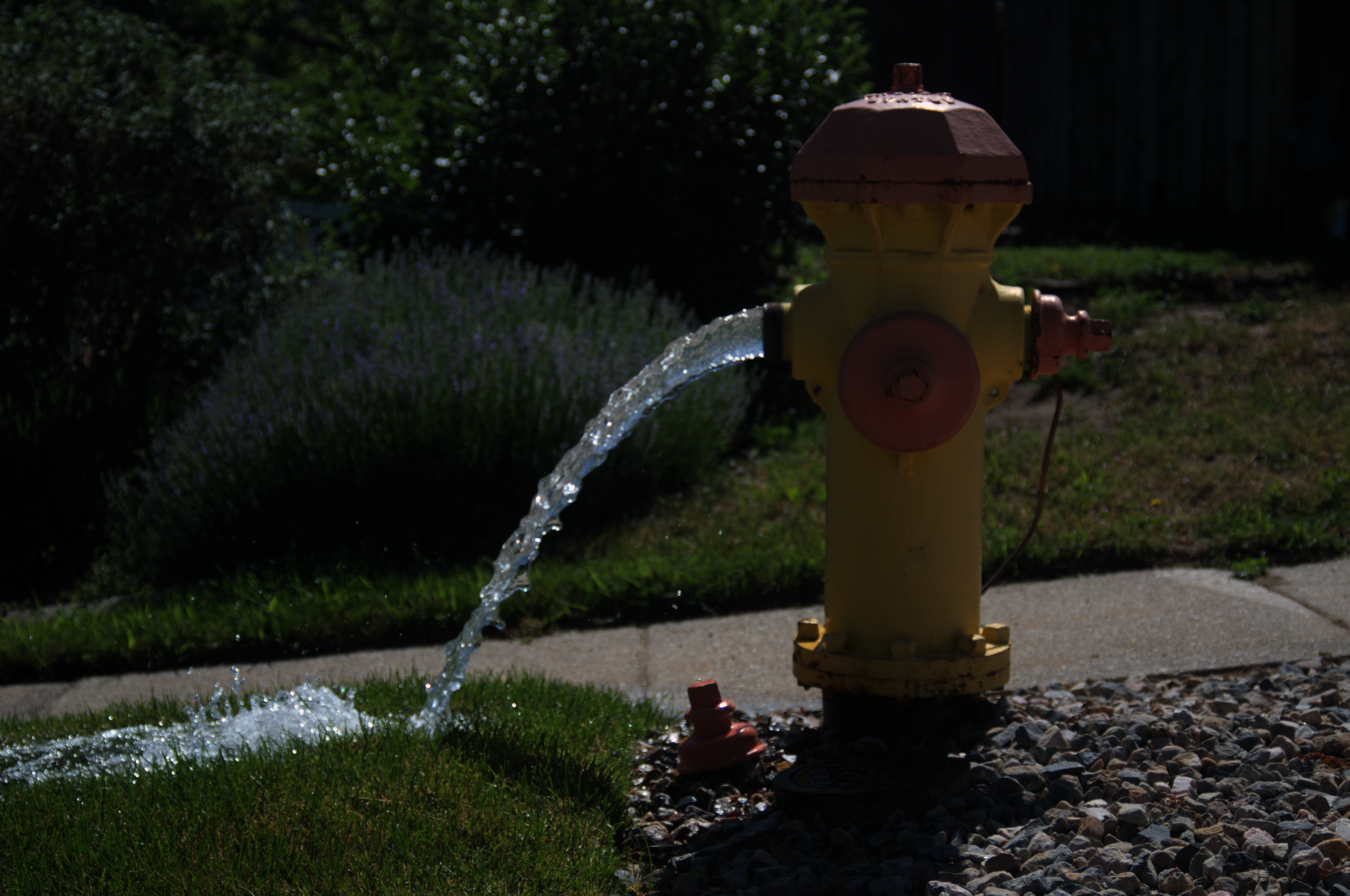
A fire hydrant with an open valve.

=== Other uses ===
==== Street pooling ====
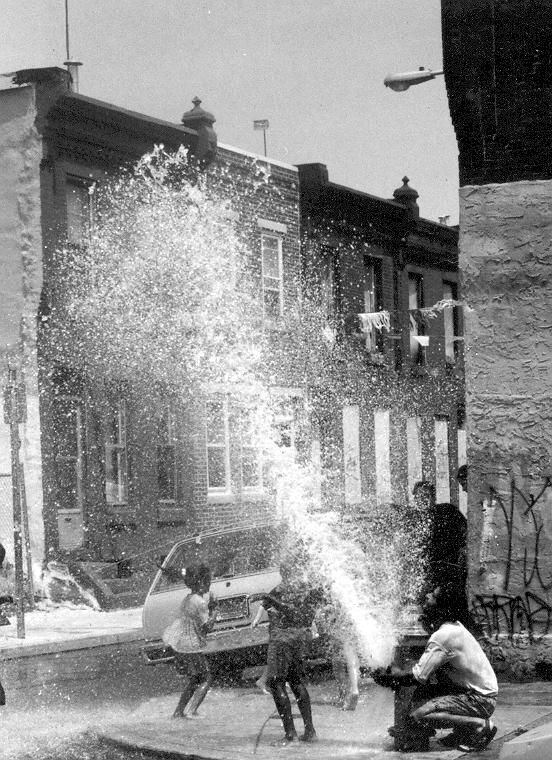
Children playing in the spray of a fire hydrant in Philadelphia (1996)

During the 1896 Eastern North America heat wave, the New York City Commissioner of Public Works ordered the opening of the fire hydrants to provide relief to the population. Today some US communities provide low flow sprinkler heads to enable residents to use the hydrants to cool off during hot weather, while gaining some control on water usage. Sometimes those simply seeking to play in the water remove the caps and open the valve, providing residents a place to play and cool off in summer.

==== Preventing misuse ====
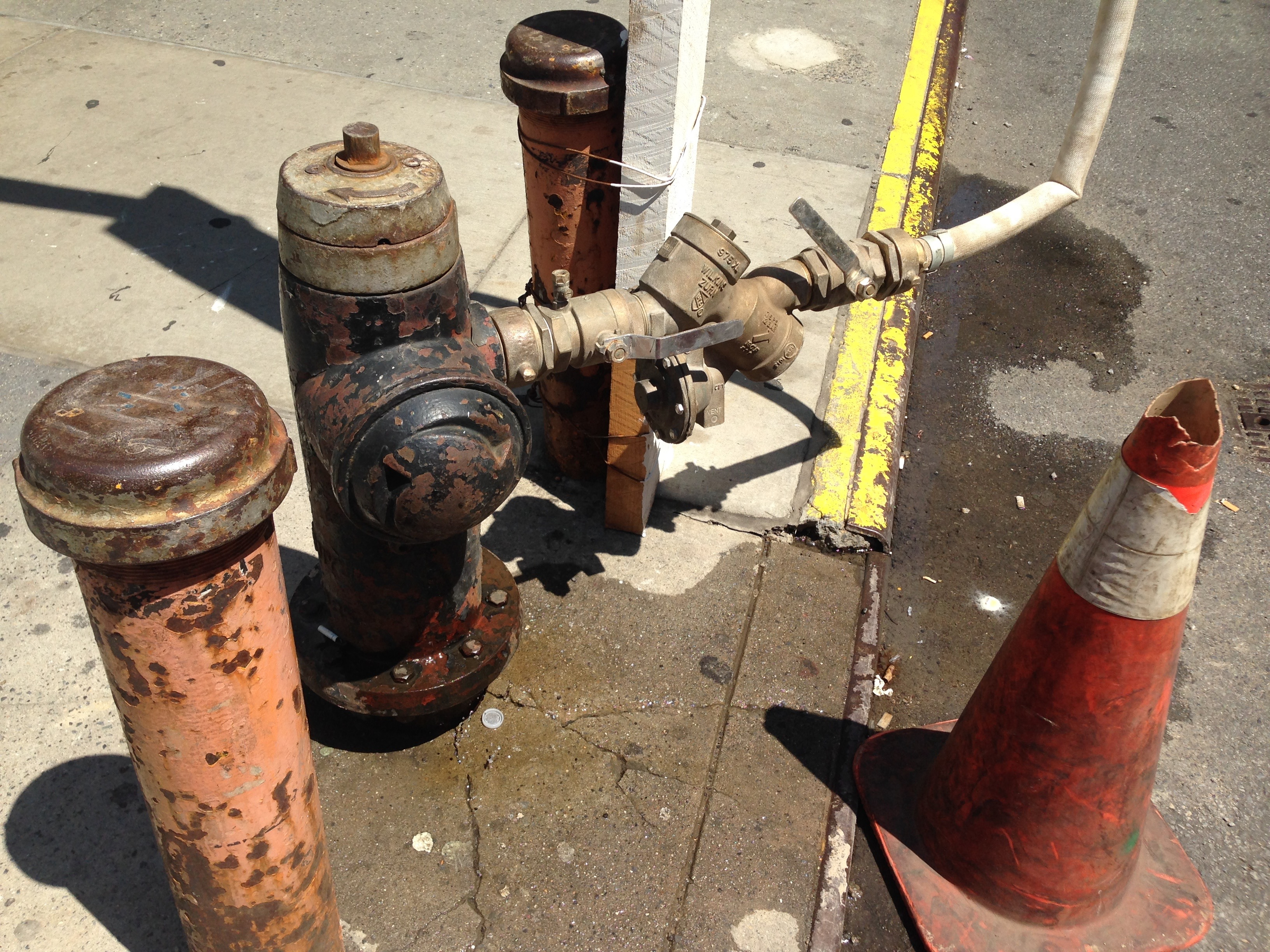
A reduced pressure zone device is used to prevent backflow when supplying water to a construction site

To prevent casual use or misuse, the hydrant requires special tools to be opened, usually a large wrench with a pentagonal socket. Vandals sometimes cause monetary loss by wasting water when they open hydrants. Such vandalism can also reduce municipal water pressure and impair firefighters' efforts to extinguish fires.

In most areas of the United States, contractors who need temporary water may purchase permits to use hydrants. The permit will generally require a hydrant meter, a gate valve and sometimes a clapper valve (if not designed into the hydrant already) to prevent backflow into the hydrant. Additionally, residents who wish to use the hydrant to fill their in-ground swimming pool are commonly permitted to do so, provided they pay for the water and agree to allow firefighters to draft from their pool in the case of an emergency.

Municipal services, such as street sweepers and tank trucks, may also be allowed to use hydrants to fill their water tanks. Often sewer maintenance trucks need water to flush out sewerage lines and fill their tanks on site from a hydrant. If necessary, the municipal workers will record the amount of water they used or use a meter.

Fire hydrants may be used to supply water to riot control vehicles. These vehicles use a high-pressure water cannon to discourage rioting.

Since fire hydrants are one of the most accessible parts of a water distribution system, they are often used for attaching pressure gauges or loggers or monitor system water pressure. Automatic flushing devices are often attached to hydrants to maintain chlorination levels in areas of low usage. Hydrants are also used as an easy above-ground access point by leak detection devices to locate leaks from the sound they make.

== Construction ==
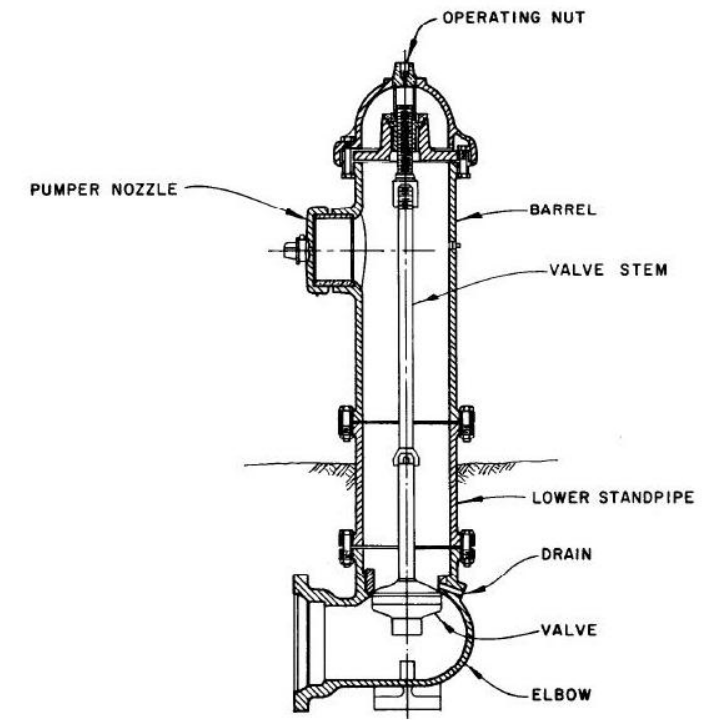
Cross-sectional illustration of a typical dry-barrel hydrant

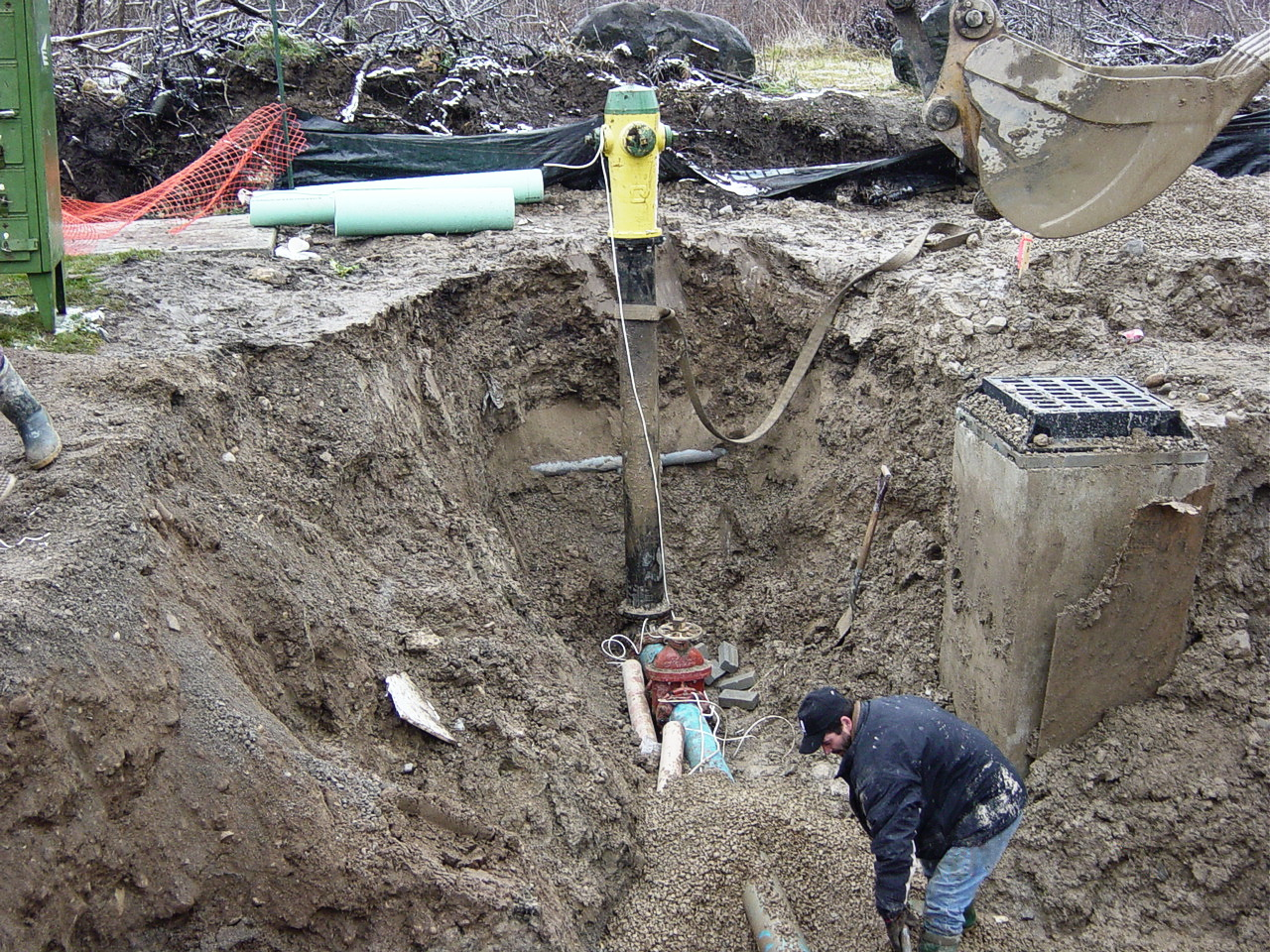
Hydrant installation in Ontario, Canada

Depending on the country or location, hydrants can be above or below ground. In countries including Japan, the UK, Ukraine, Russia or Spain hydrants are accessible under a heavy metal cover. In other countries, such as the US, and many parts of China, an accessible part of the hydrant is above ground. It can also be mounted in an exterior wall of a building.

In areas subject to freezing temperatures, at most only a portion of the hydrant is above ground. The valve is located below the frost line and connected by a riser to the above-ground portion. A valve rod extends from the valve up through a seal at the top of the hydrant, where it can be operated with the proper wrench. This design is known as a "dry barrel" hydrant, in that the barrel, or vertical body of the hydrant, is normally dry. A drain valve underground opens when the water valve is completely closed; this allows all water to drain from the hydrant body to prevent the hydrant from freezing.

In warm areas, above-ground hydrants may be used with one or more valves in the above-ground portion. Unlike with cold-weather hydrants, it is possible to turn the water supply on and off to each port. This style is known as a "wet barrel" hydrant.

Both wet- and dry-barrel hydrants typically have multiple outlets. Wet barrel hydrant outlets are typically individually controlled, while a single stem operates all the outlets of a dry barrel hydrant simultaneously. Thus, wet barrel hydrants allow single outlets to be opened, requiring somewhat more effort, but simultaneously allowing more flexibility.

A typical US dry-barrel hydrant has two smaller outlets and one larger outlet. The larger outlet is often a Storz connection if the local fire department has standardized on hose using Storz fittings for large diameter supply line. The larger outlet is known as a "steamer" connection, because they were once used to supply steam powered water pumps, and a hydrant with such an outlet may be called a "steamer hydrant", although this usage is becoming archaic. Likewise, an older hydrant without a steamer connection may be called a "village hydrant."

== Appearance ==
In Germany, the Netherlands, Spain, the UK, and many other countries, most hydrants are located below ground and are reached by a riser, which provides the connections for the hoses. The covers can also be artistically designed.

In East Asia (China, Japan and South Korea) and former Socialist countries of Eastern Europe, there are two types of fire hydrants, of which one is on the public ground and the other inside a building. The ones inside a building are installed on a wall. They are big, rectangular boxes that also provide alarms (sirens), a fire extinguisher and, at certain times, emergency kits.

=== Color coding ===
Fire hydrant in Livermore, California colored lilac to indicate non-potable water

Above-ground hydrants are coloured for visibility, to signal their characteristics, or for aesthetics. In the United States, the AWWA and NFPA recommend hydrants be colored chrome yellow for rapid identification apart from the bonnet and nozzle caps which should be coded as follows according to their available flow.

- Blue: 1,500 US gallons per minute (1,249 imp gal/min; 95 L/s) or more; very good flow
- Green: 1,000–1,499 US gallons per minute (833–1,248 imp gal/min; 63–95 L/s); good for residential areas
- Orange: 500–999 US gallons per minute (416–832 imp gal/min; 32–63 L/s); marginally adequate
- Red: below 500 US gallons per minute (416 imp gal/min; 32 L/s); inadequate

The hydrant bodies are also color-coded.

- Chrome Yellow: Municipal System
- Red: Private System
- Violet or lilac: Non-potable supply

These markings and colours are prescribed in NFPA 291: Recommended Practice for Water Flow Testing and Marking of Hydrants. but most municipal water authorities do not actually follow these guidelines.

Other codings can be and frequently are used, some of greater complexity, incorporating pressure information, others more simplistic. In Ottawa, Ontario, hydrant colors communicate different messages to firefighters; for example, if the inside of the hydrant is corroded so much that the interior diameter is too narrow for good pressure, it will be painted in a specific scheme to indicate to firefighters to move on to the next one. In many localities, a white or purple top indicates that the hydrant provides non-potable water. Where artistic and/or aesthetic considerations are paramount, hydrants can be extremely varied, or more subdued. In both instances this is usually at the cost of reduced practicality.

== Signage ==
In the United Kingdom and Ireland, hydrants are located in the ground. Yellow "H" hydrant signs indicate the location of the hydrants and are similar to the blue signs in Finland. Mounted on a small post or nearby wall etc., the two numbers indicate the diameter of the water main (top number) and the distance from the sign (lower number). Modern signs show these measurements in millimetres and metres, whereas older signs use inches and feet. Because the orders of magnitude are so different (6 inches versus 150 mm) there is no ambiguity whichever measuring system is used.

In areas of the United States without winter snow cover, blue reflectors embedded in the street are used to allow rapid identification of hydrants at night. In areas with snow cover, tall signs or flags are used so that hydrants can be found even if covered with snow. In rural areas tall narrow posts painted with visible colours such as red are attached to the hydrants to allow them to be found during heavy snowfall periods. The tops of the fire hydrants indicate available flow in gallons per minute; the color helps make a more accurate choice of what hydrants will be utilized to supply water to the fire scene.

In Australia, hydrant signage varies, with several types displayed across the country. Most Australian hydrants are underground, being of a ballcock system (spring hydrant type), and a separate standpipe with a central plunger is used to open the valve. Consequently, hydrant signage is essential, because of their concealed nature. Australia also uses violet or lilac on hydrants to indicate a non-potable water supply.

In the Fire Rescue Victoria fire district, L-type hydrants are above-ground hydrants with a non-reflective Signal Red cover top for identification. Fire Rescue Victoria advises that L-type covers should not be used to identify below-ground hydrants because they cause unnecessary delays in obtaining water.

- Painted markers – Usually a white or yellow (sometimes reflective paint) triangle or arrow painted on the road, pointing towards the side of the road the hydrant will be found on. These are most common in old areas, or on new roads where more advanced signs have not been installed. These are almost always coupled with a secondary form of signage.
- Hydrant Marker Plates – Found on power poles, fences, or street-signs, these are a comprehensive and effective system of identification. The plate consists of several codes; H (Potable water Hydrant), RH (Recycled/Non-Potable), P (Pathway, where the hydrant cover can be found), R (Roadway). The plate is vertically oriented, around 8 cm wide, and 15 cm high. It usually faces in the direction of the hydrant. Found on this plate, from top to bottom, are the following features:
  - The codes listed above, Potable/Non-potable at the top, Path/Roadway on the bottom of the plate.
  - Below this, a number giving the distance to the hydrant (in meters), then a second number below that giving the size (in millimeters) of the water main.
  - A black line across the center of the plate indicates the hydrant is found on the opposite side of the road to which the plate is affixed.
  - Plates for recycled water have a purple background, as well as the RH code, normal potable hydrants are white, with the H code.
- Road markers or Cat's eyes – Almost exclusively blue, these are placed on one side or the other of the centre line of the road, to indicate on which side of the road the hydrant lies. They are visible for several hundred meters at night in heavy rain, further in clear conditions.

In Germany the hydrant marker plates follow the style of other marker plates pointing to underground installations. Fire hydrant marker plates have a red border. Other water hydrants may have a blue border. A gas hydrant would have a yellow background instead of a white one for fire hydrants. All of them have large central T with the installation identification on top of it – an "H" or older "UH" is located in the ground, a "OH" is above ground, followed by the pipe inner diameter in millimeters (with a small 80 mm in residential areas). The numbers around the T allow to locate the installation in reference to the plate's location – the number left of the T is in meter left of the sign, the number right of the T is in meter right of the sign, and number below the T tells the distance in meter in front of the sign, where a negative number would point to a place behind the sign. The distance numbers are always given with a comma decimeter precision. If it is not a common fire hydrant type then another identification may be used, for example "300 m³" would point to a cistern usable to pump water from.

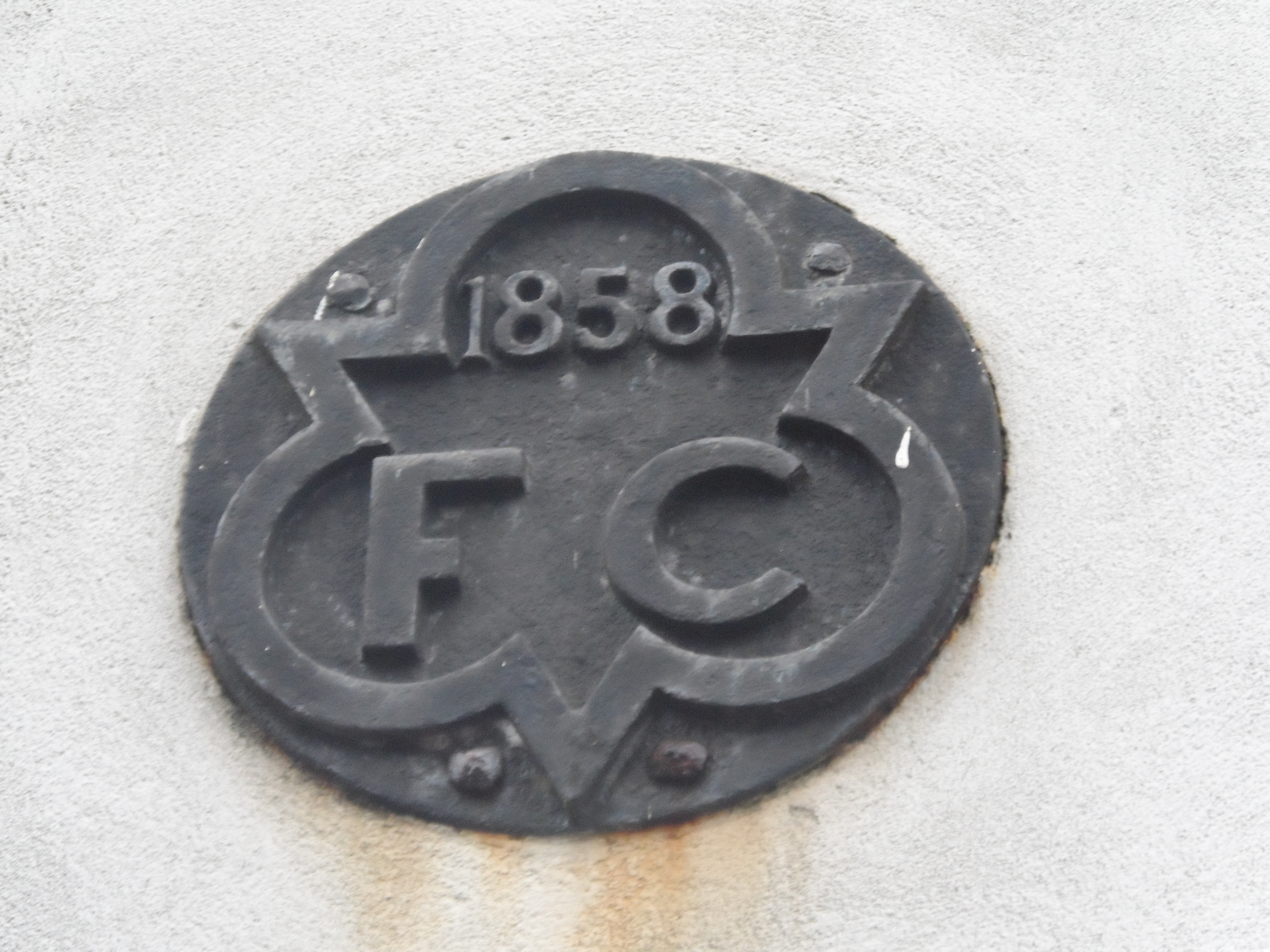
Hydrant sign in Cork, Ireland, dated 1858. The letters "FC" indicate the old name for a hydrant: firecock.

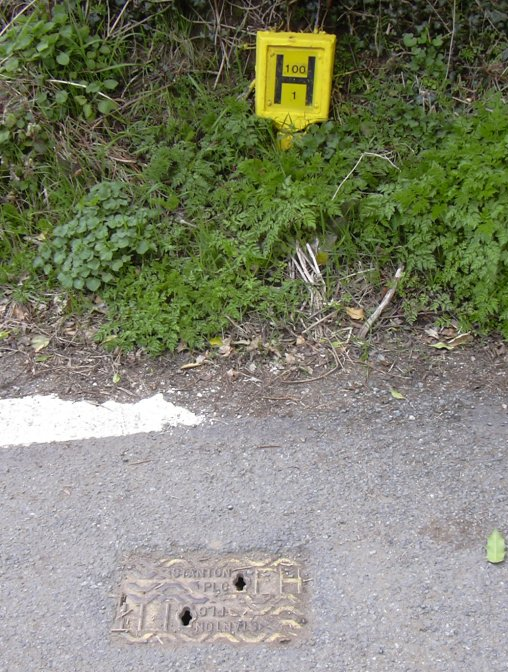
British fire hydrant and sign – the "100" and "1" within the "H" indicates the water main is 100 mm in diameter and the hydrant is 1 metre from the sign; older versions are in inches and feet respectively (e.g. "4" and "3" in this case)

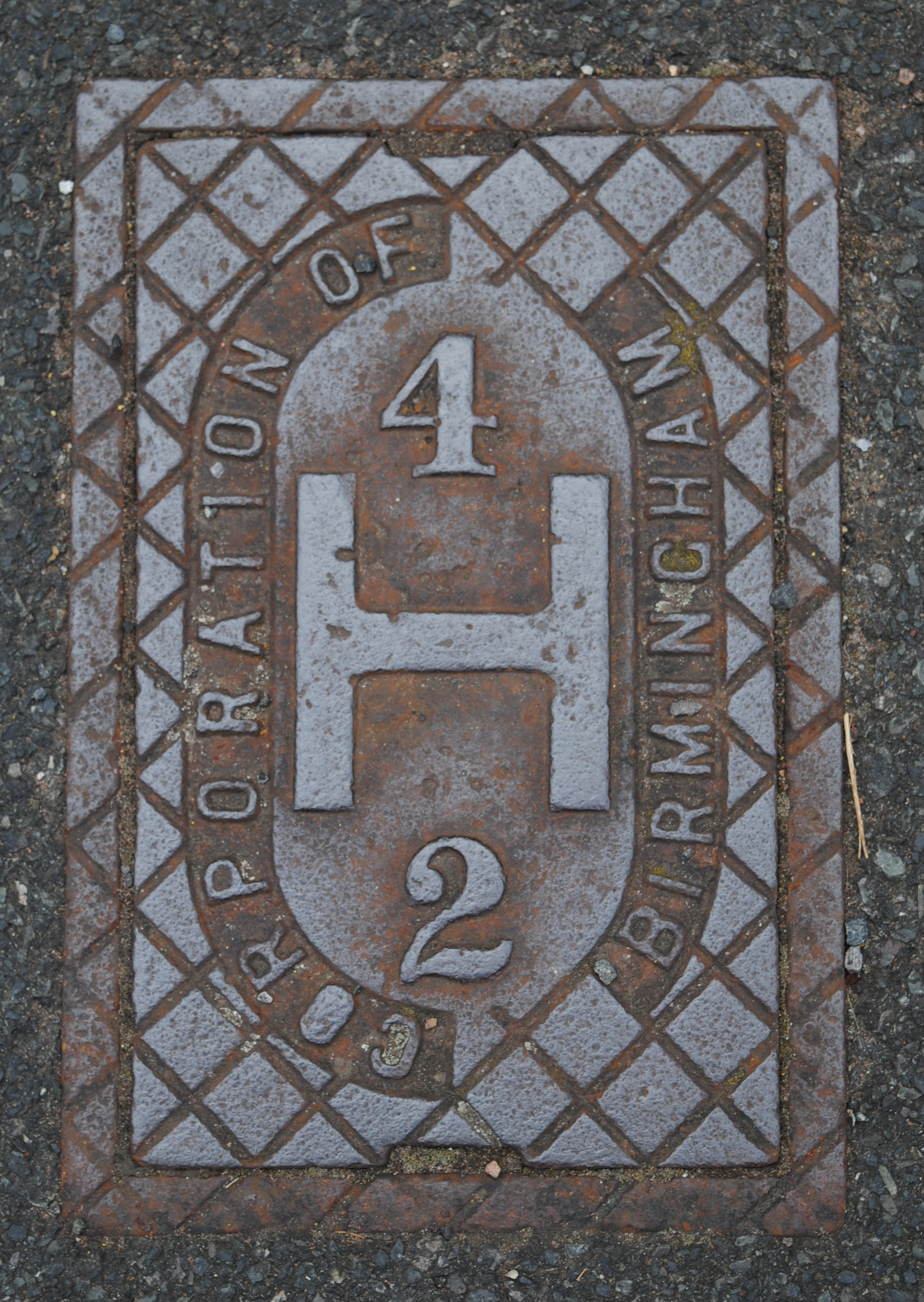
'Corporation of Birmingham' hydrant cover, England, circa 1920s

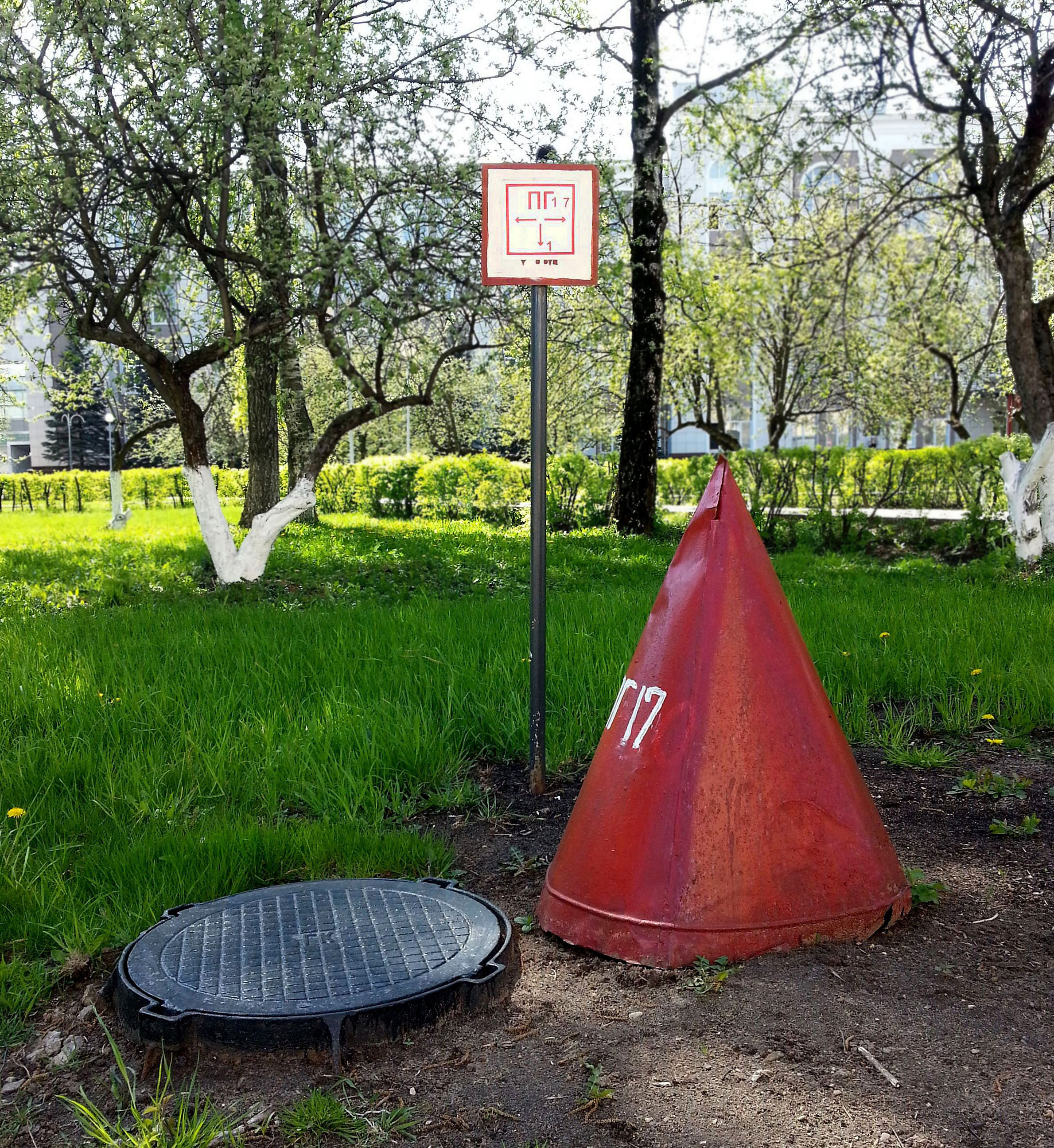
Underground hydrant in Russia, marked with a plate and a red cone

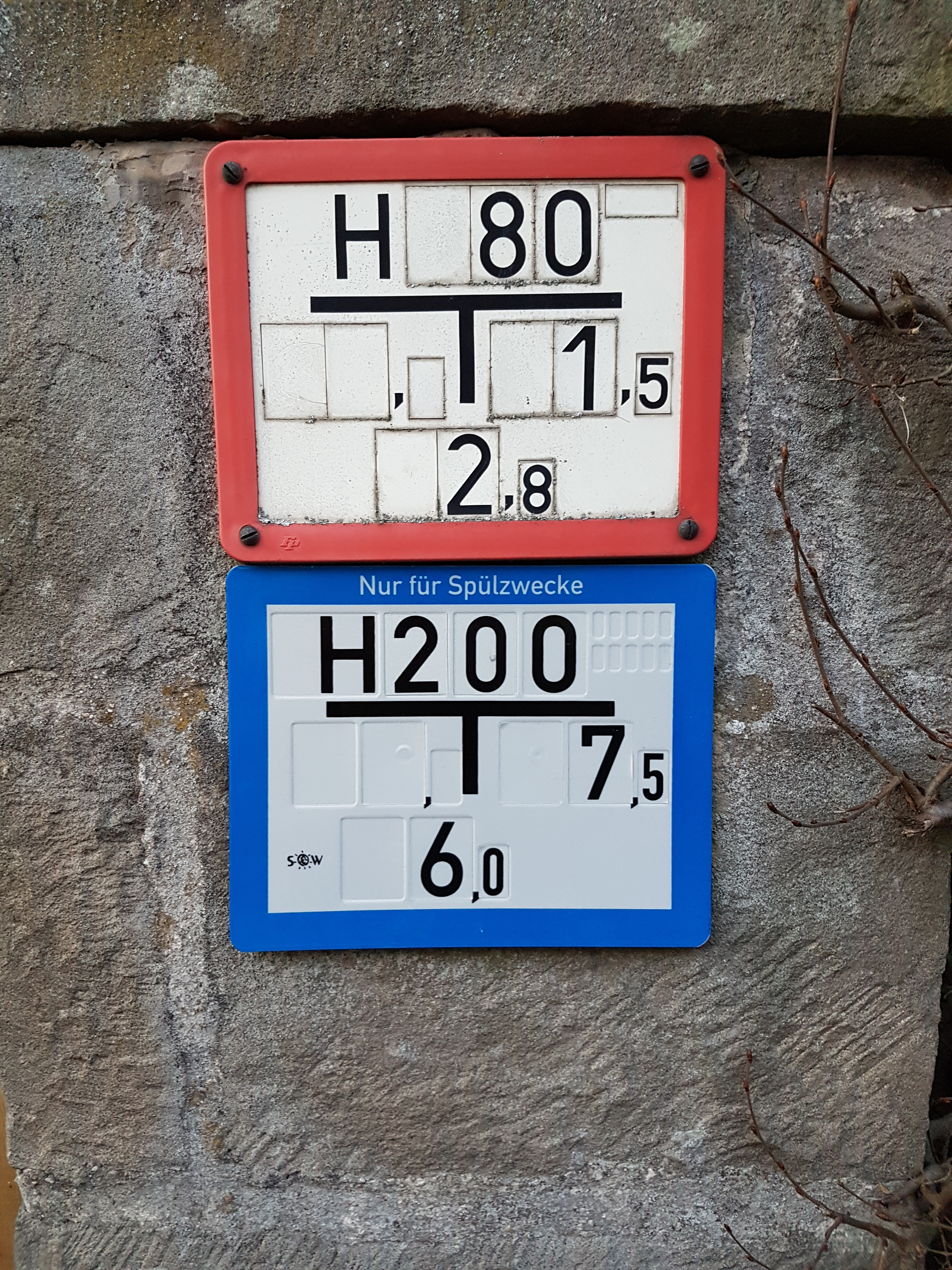
Red fire hydrant marker plate in Germany, along with another blue special-purpose water hydrant marker plate – The numbers indicate the diameter (80 mm) and the location (2.8 meter in the back, 1.5 meter to the right).

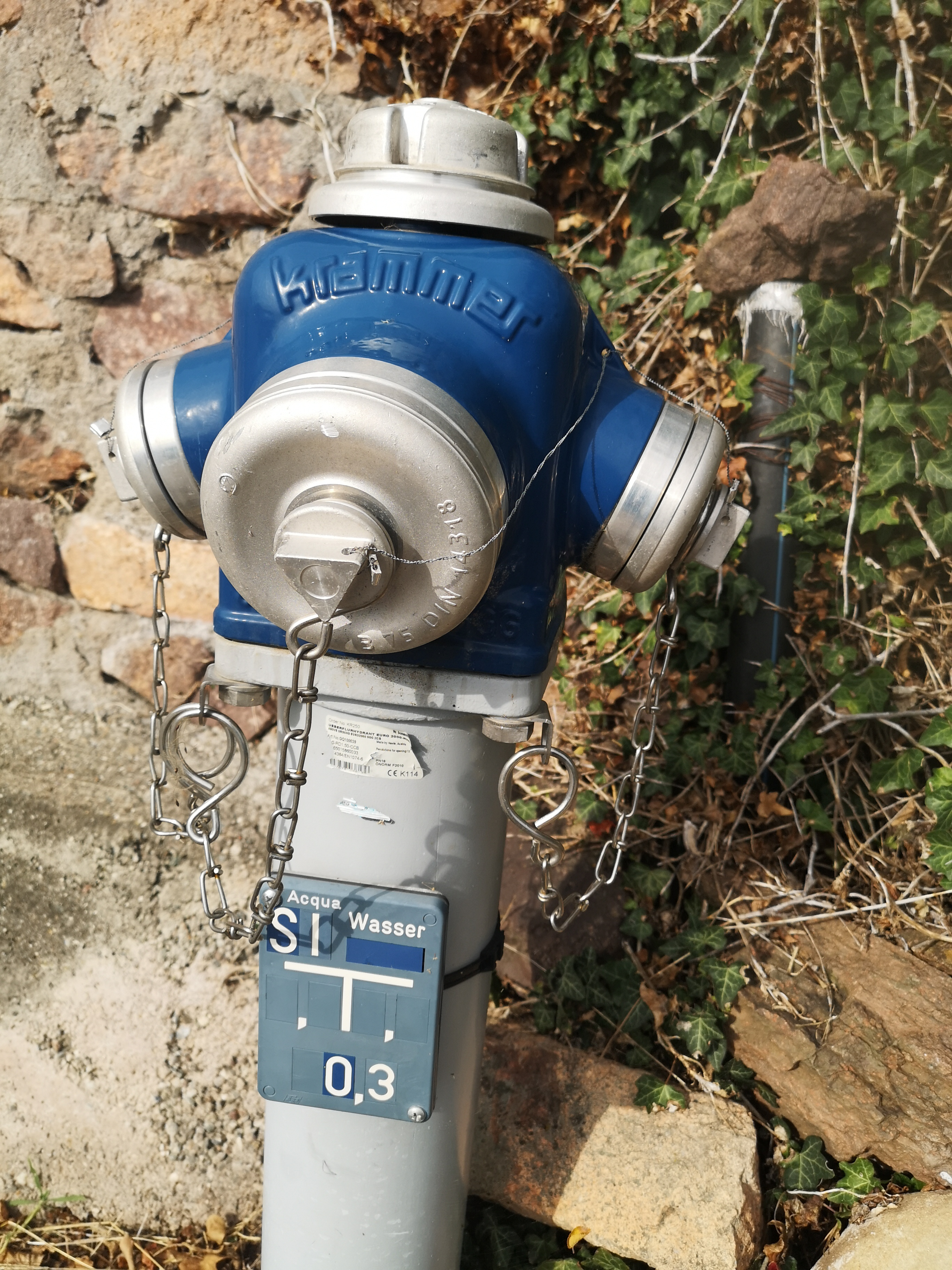
Fire hydrant in South Tyrol, with a blue marker plate

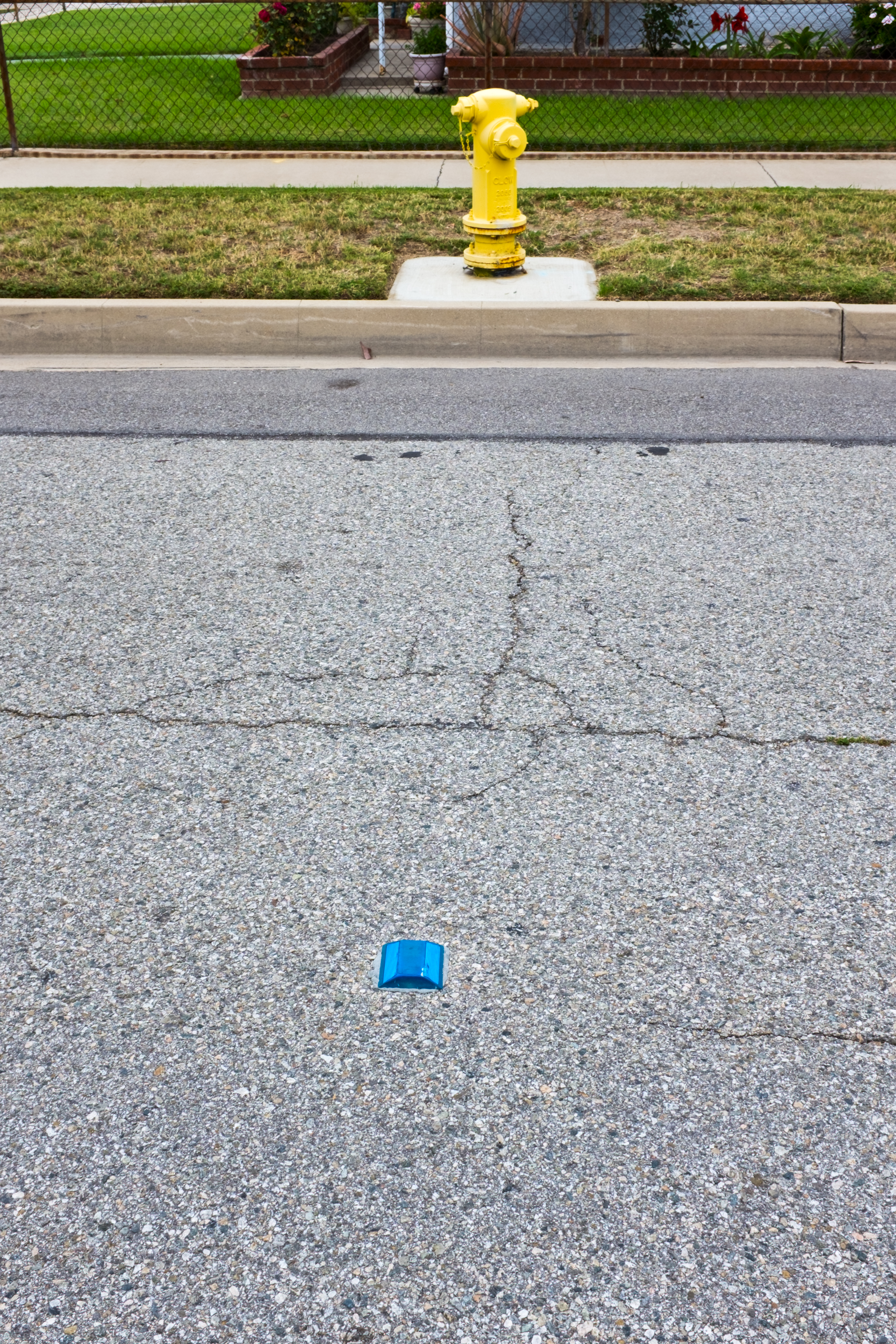
A blue reflector marks the location of the fire hydrant

== Inspection and maintenance ==
In most areas, fire hydrants require annual inspections and maintenance; they normally only have a one-year warranty, but some have 5- or even 10-year warranties, although the longer warranty does not remove the need for periodic inspections or maintenance. These inspections are generally performed by the local municipalities or fire departments, but they often do not inspect hydrants that are identified as private. Private hydrants are usually located on larger properties to adequately protect large buildings in case of a fire and in order to comply with the fire code. Such hydrants have met the requirements of insurance underwriters and are often referred to as UL/FM hydrants. Usually, companies are contracted out to inspect private fire hydrants, unless the municipality has undertaken that task.

Some fire hydrant manufacturers recommend lubricating the head mechanism and restoring the head gaskets and O-rings annually in order that the fire hydrant perform the service expected of them, while others have incorporated proprietary features to provide long-term lubrication of the hydrant's operating mechanism. In any case, periodic inspection of lubricants is recommended. Lubrication is generally done with a food-grade non-petroleum lubricant to avoid contamination of the distribution system.

Occasionally a stone or foreign object will mar the seat gasket. In this case, most hydrants have a special seat wrench that allows removal of the seat to replace the gasket or other broken parts without removing the hydrant from the ground. Hydrant extensions are also available for raising a hydrant if the grade around the hydrant changes. Without extending the height, the wrenches to remove caps would not clear and the break flanges for traffic models would not be located correctly in case they were hit. Hydrant repair kits are also available to repair sacrificial parts designed to break when hit by a vehicle.

Many fire departments use the hydrants for flushing out water line sediments. When doing so, they often use a hydrant diffuser, a device that diffuses the water so that it does not damage property and is less dangerous to bystanders than a solid stream. Some diffusers also dechlorinate the water to avoid ground contamination. Hydrants are also sometimes used as entry or exit points for pipe cleaning pigs.

In 2011, Code for America developed an "Adopt a Hydrant" website, which enables volunteers to sign up to shovel out fire hydrants after snowstorms. As of 2014, the system has been implemented in Boston; Providence, Rhode Island; Anchorage, Alaska; and Chicago.

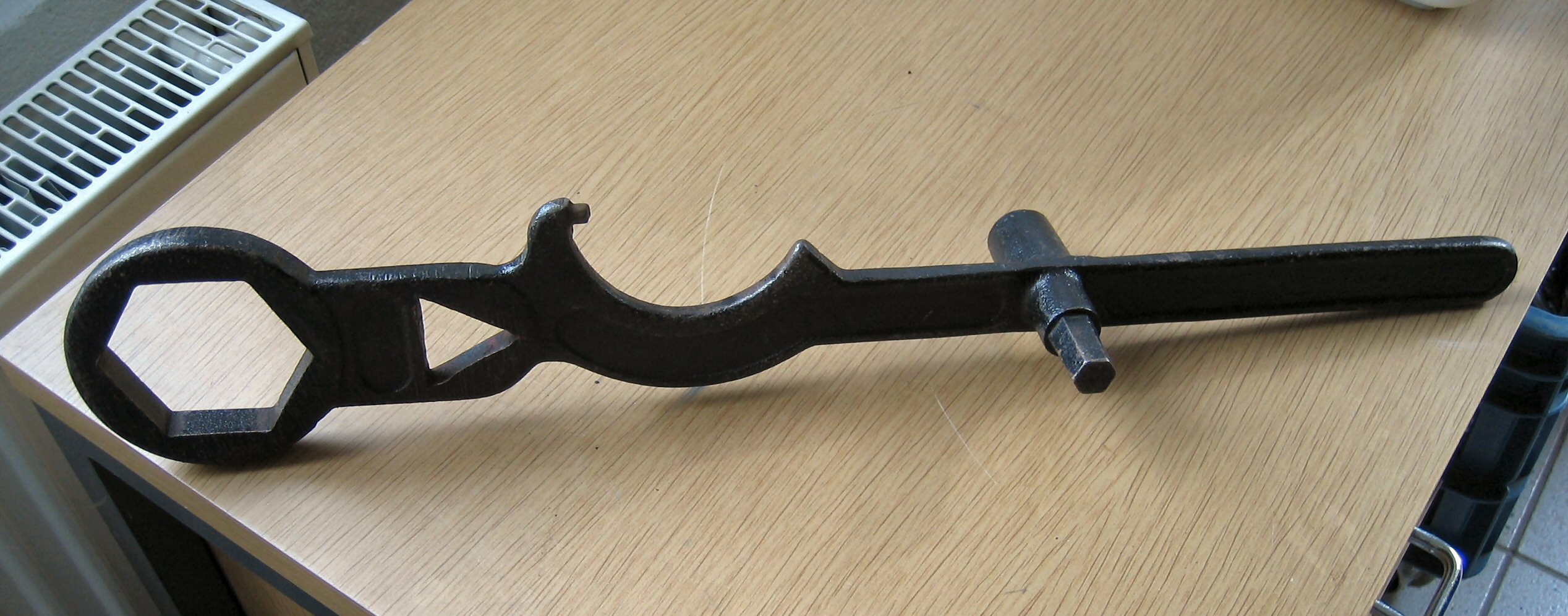
Fire hydrant wrench (Germany)

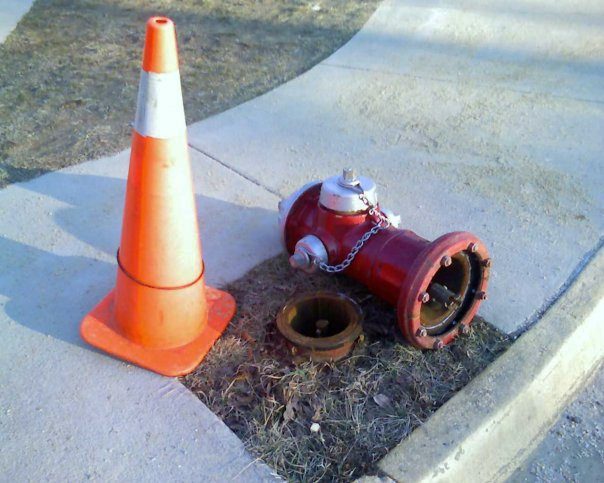
A fire hydrant that was hit by a snowplow and knocked over, damaging only the sacrificial bolts

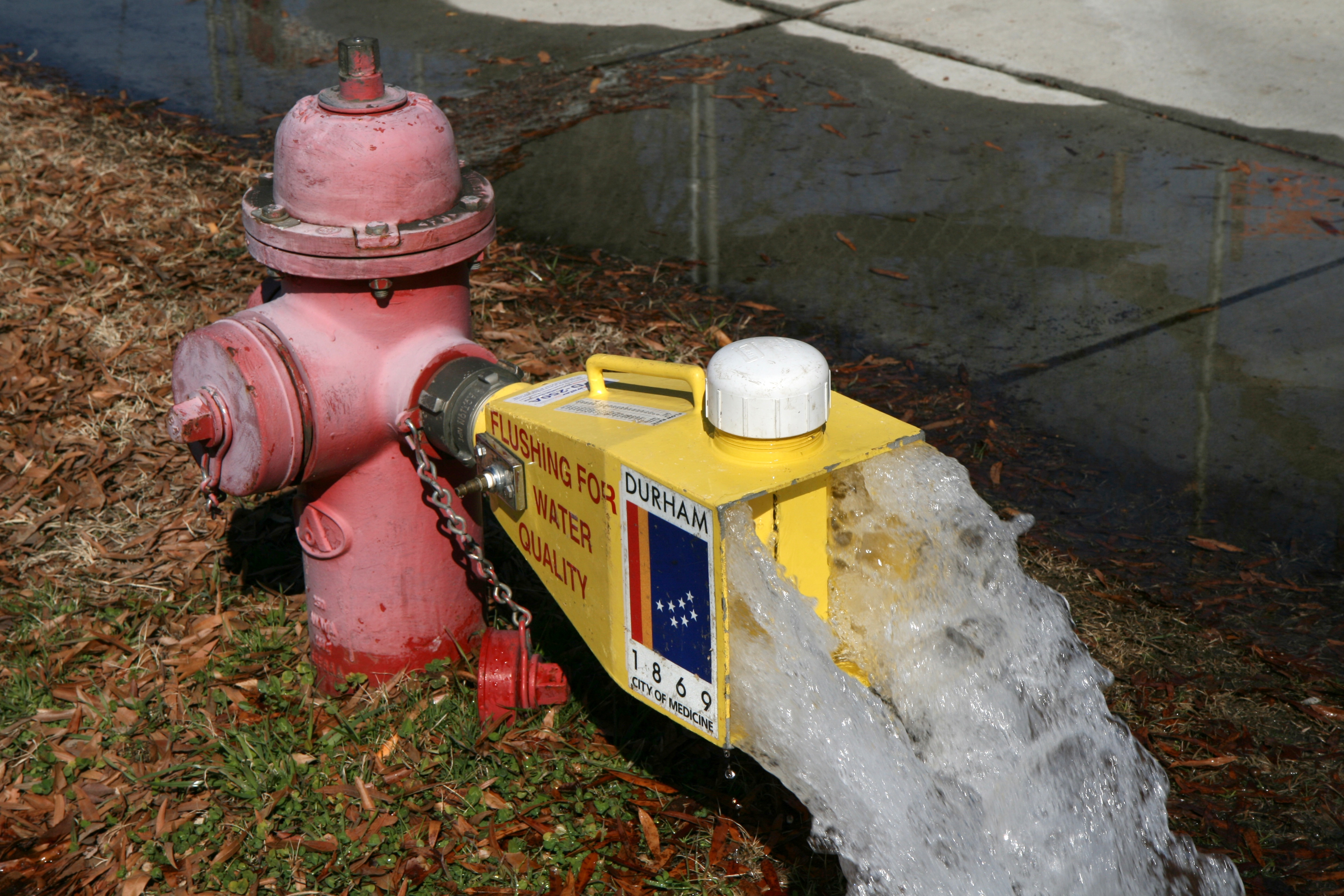
A fire hydrant flushing water through a diffuser in Durham, North Carolina

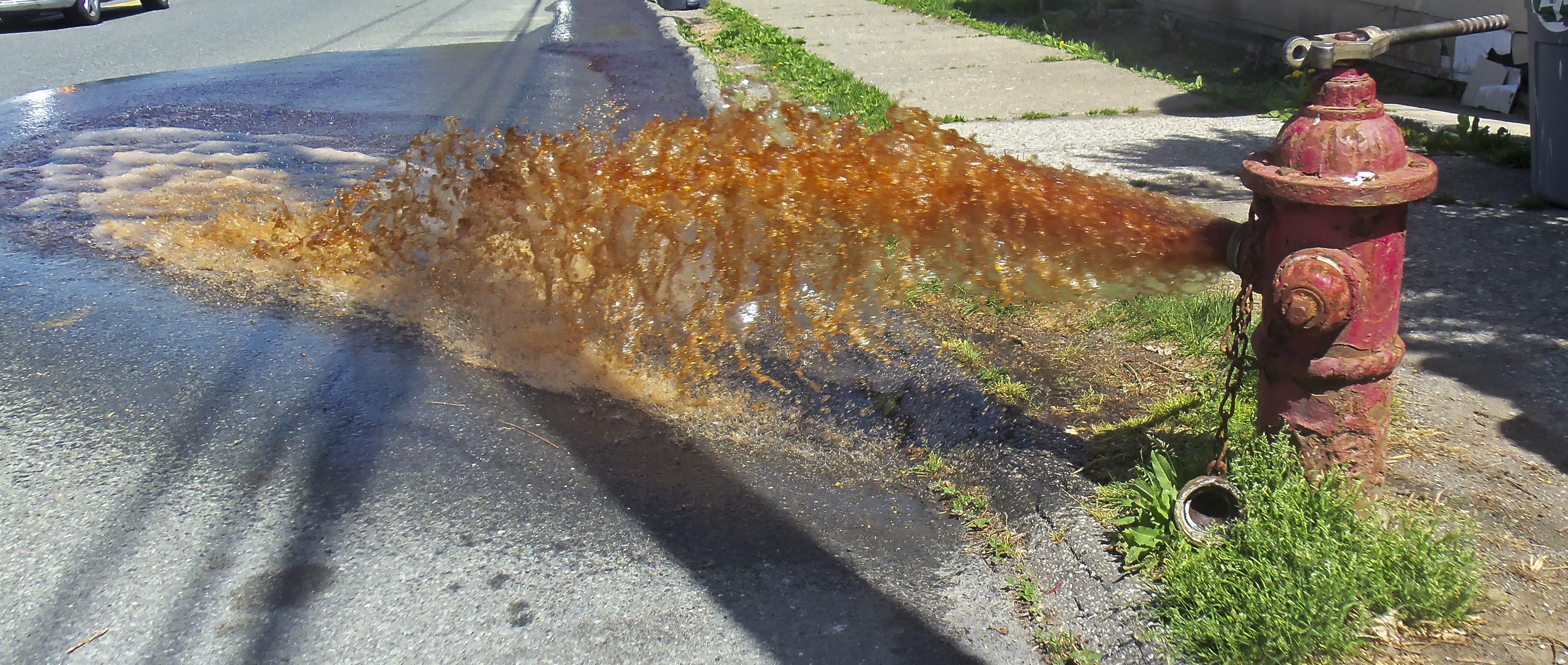
A fire hydrant without a diffuser, flushing discolored water

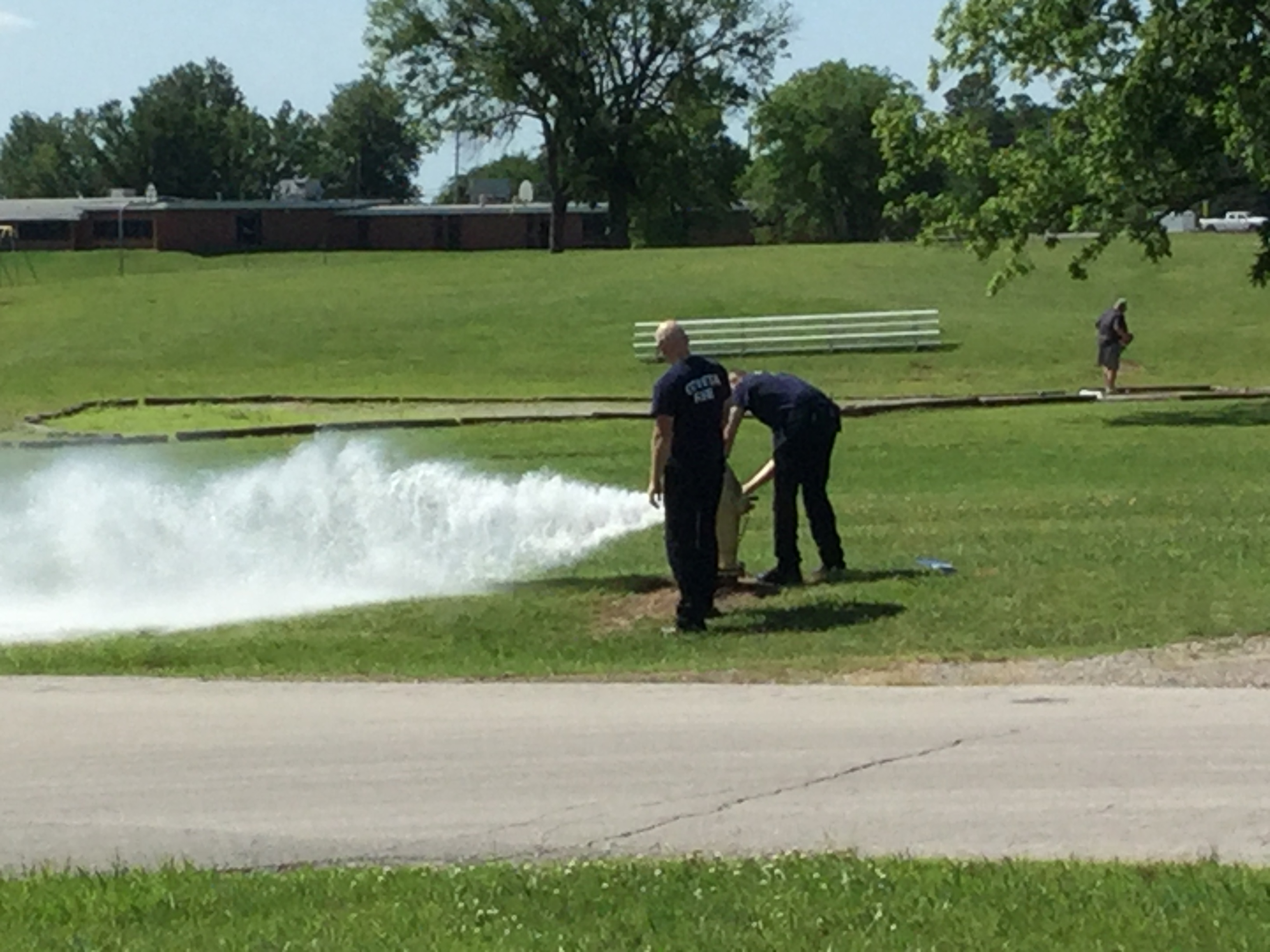
Hydrant testing by firefighters

== Non-pressurized (dry) Hydrants ==
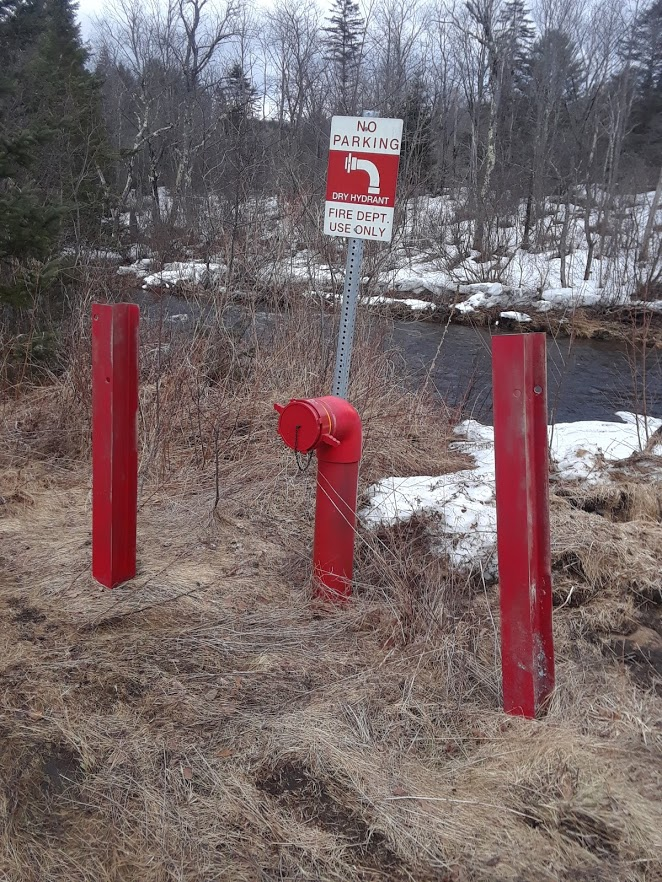
A dry hydrant by Passumpsic River in rural Vermont

In rural areas where municipal water systems are not available, dry hydrants are used to supply water for fighting fires. A dry hydrant is analogous to a standpipe. A dry hydrant is usually an unpressurized, permanently installed pipe that has one end below the water level of a lake or pond. This end usually has a strainer to prevent debris or wildlife, such as fish, from entering the pipe. The other end is above ground and has a hard sleeve connector.

When needed, a pumper fire engine will pump from the lake or pond by drafting water. This is done by vacuuming the air out of the dry hydrant, hard sleeve, and the fire engine pump with a primer. Because lower pressure now exists at the pump intake, atmospheric pressure on the water and the weight of the water forces water into the above-water portion of the dry hydrant, into the hard sleeve, and finally into the pump. This water can then be pumped by the engine's centrifugal pump.

== Other types ==
- Water wells are also sometimes classified as fire hydrants if they can supply enough water volume and pressure.
- Standpipes are connections for firehoses within a building and serve the same purpose inside larger structures as fire hydrants do outdoors. Standpipes may be "dry" or "wet" (permanently filled with water); a dry standpipe requires an external source of water such as firefighting equipment.

== History ==
Before piped mains supplies, water for firefighting had to be kept in buckets and cauldrons ready for use by 'bucket-brigades' or brought with a horse-drawn fire-pump. From the 16th century, as wooden mains water systems were installed, firefighters would dig down to the pipes and drill a hole for water to fill a "wet well" for the buckets or pumps. This had to be filled and plugged afterwards, hence the common US term for a hydrant, 'fireplug'. A marker would be left to indicate where a 'plug' had already been drilled to enable firefighters to find ready-drilled holes. Later wooden systems had pre-drilled holes and plugs.

When cast iron pipes replaced the wood, permanent underground access points were included for the fire fighters. Some countries provide access covers to these points, while others attach fixed above-ground hydrants – the first cast iron ones were patented in 1801 by Frederick Graff, then chief-engineer of the Philadelphia Water Works. Invention since then has targeted problems such as tampering, freezing, connection, reliability etc.

A below-ground fire hydrant during World War I

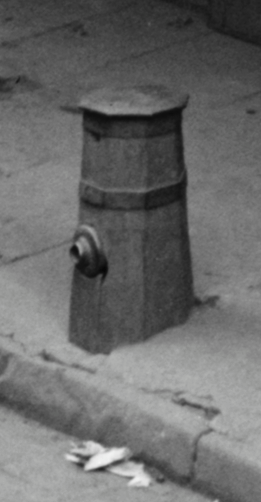
Old style wooden "fire plug" still in use c. 1900

Wooden fire hydrant, c. 1842

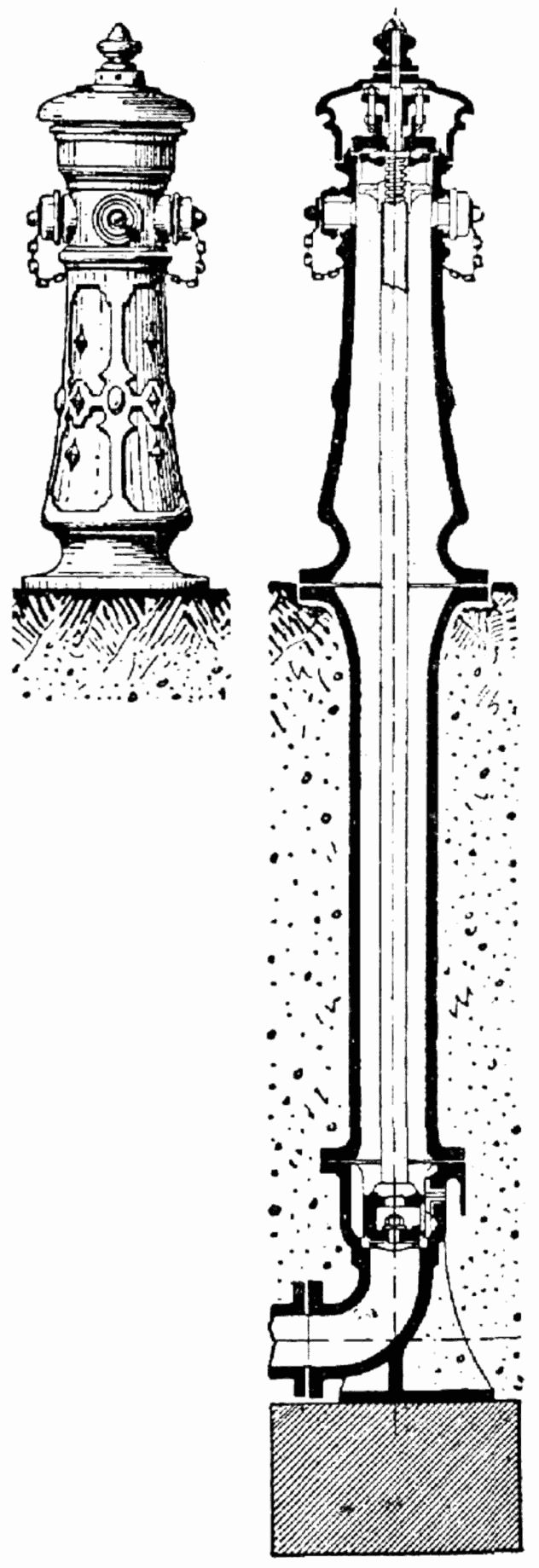
Cast iron hydrant, 1904

Hand-powered pump, 1838

== Gallery ==
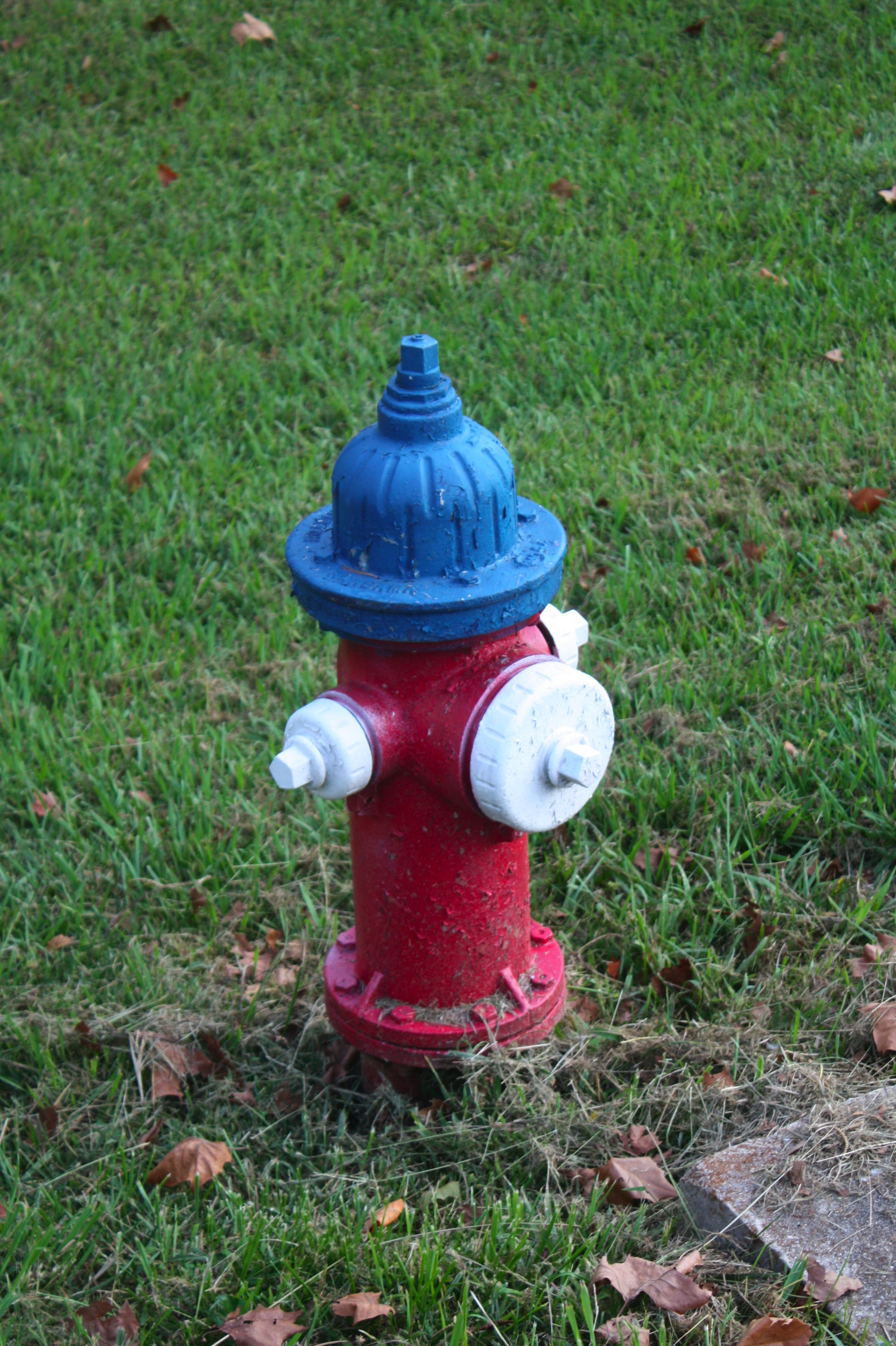
Hydrant in the United States painted with an American patriotic theme

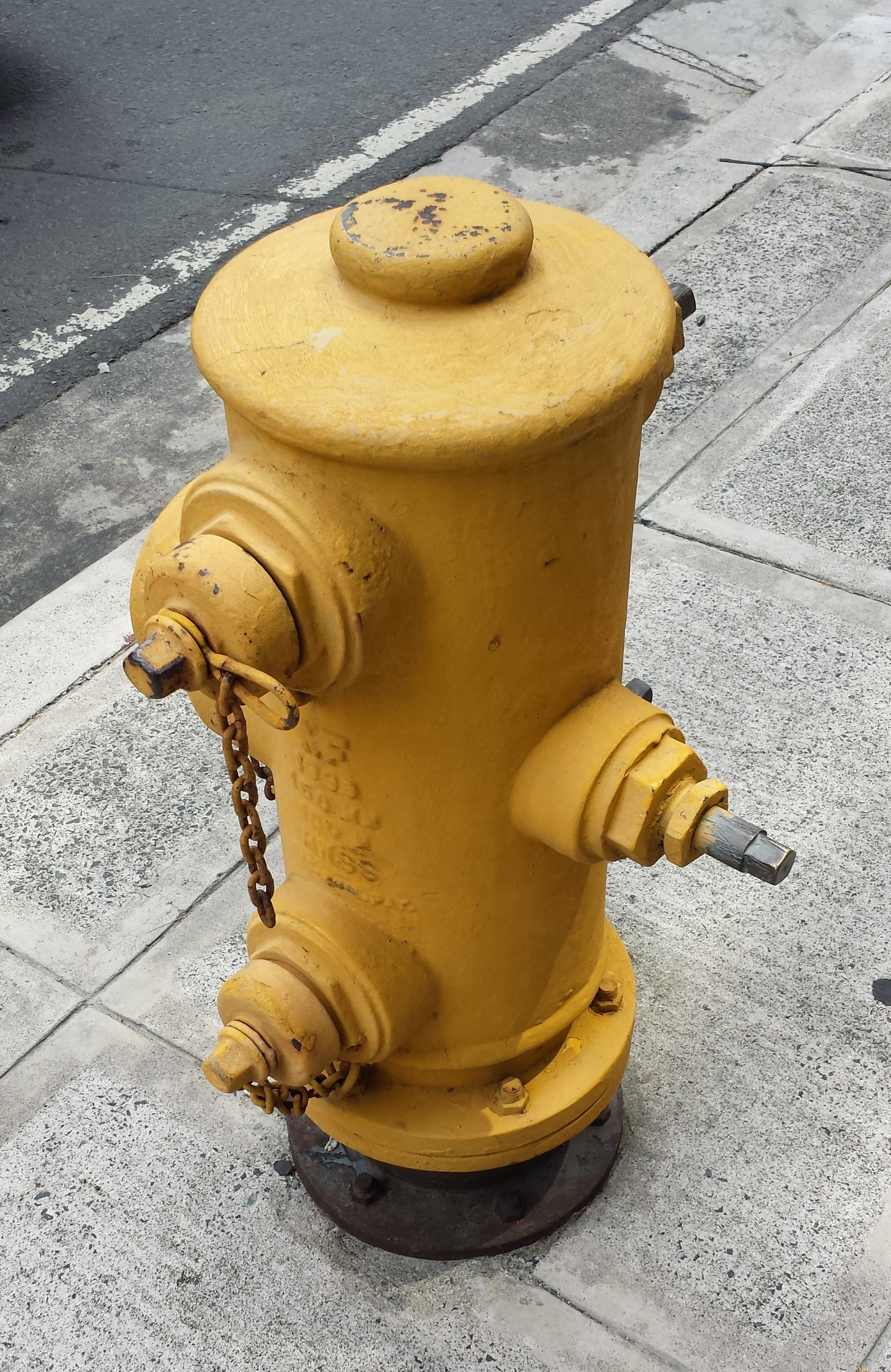
Hydrant in the Philippines

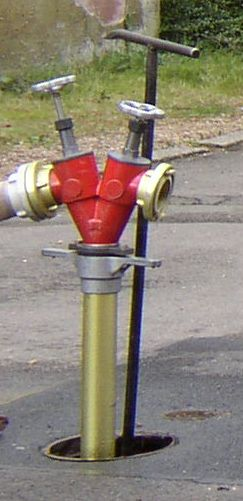
German underground hydrant with Storz hose connections

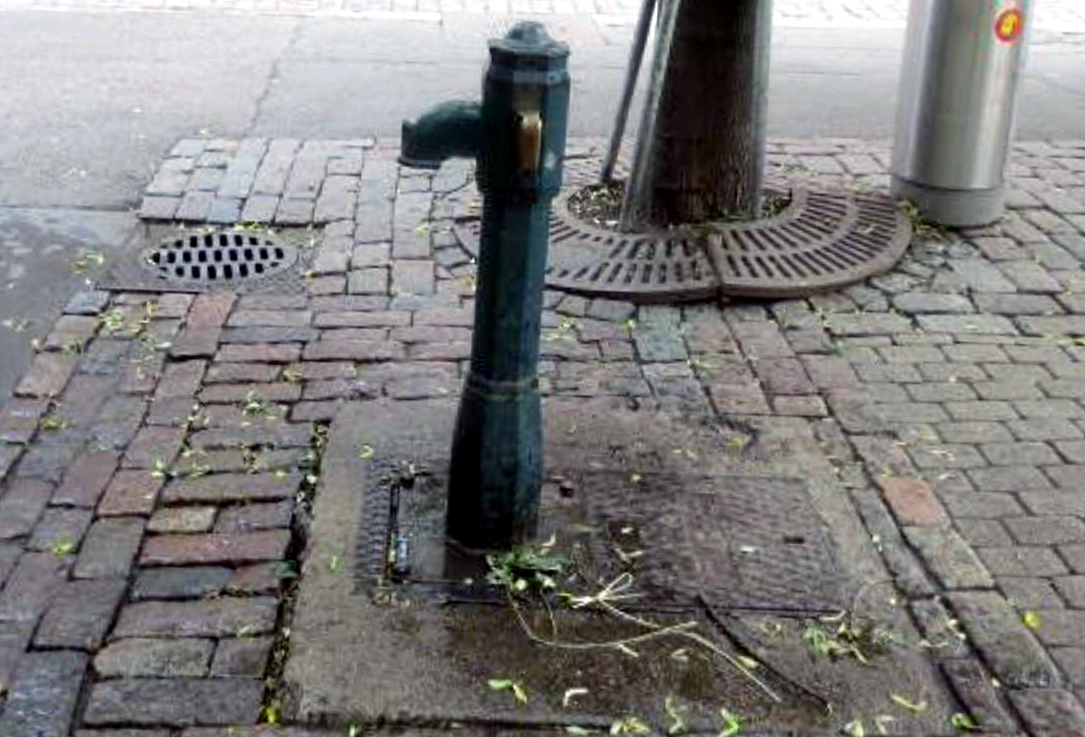
Hydrant at Fredantori square in Helsinki, Finland

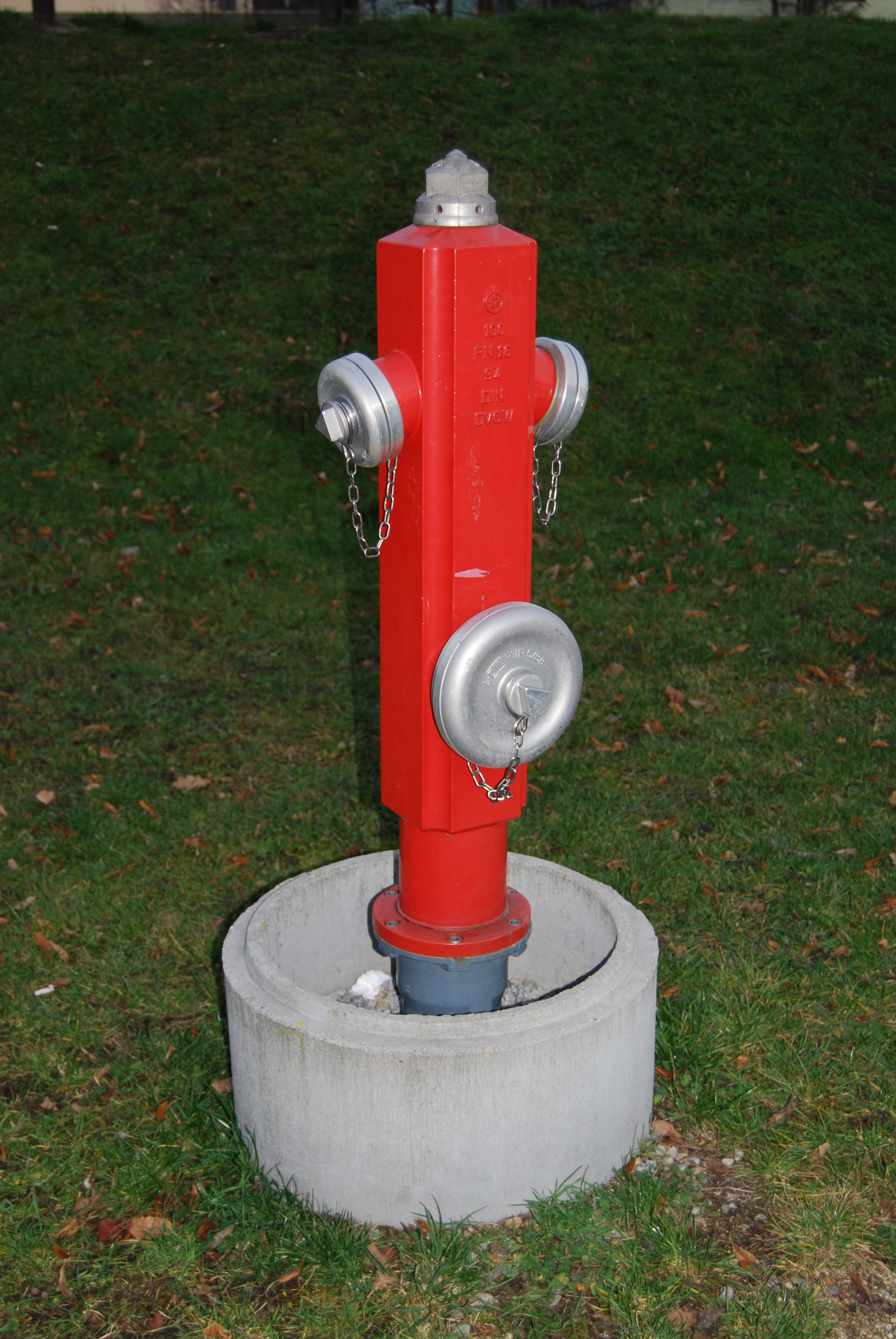
Czech example

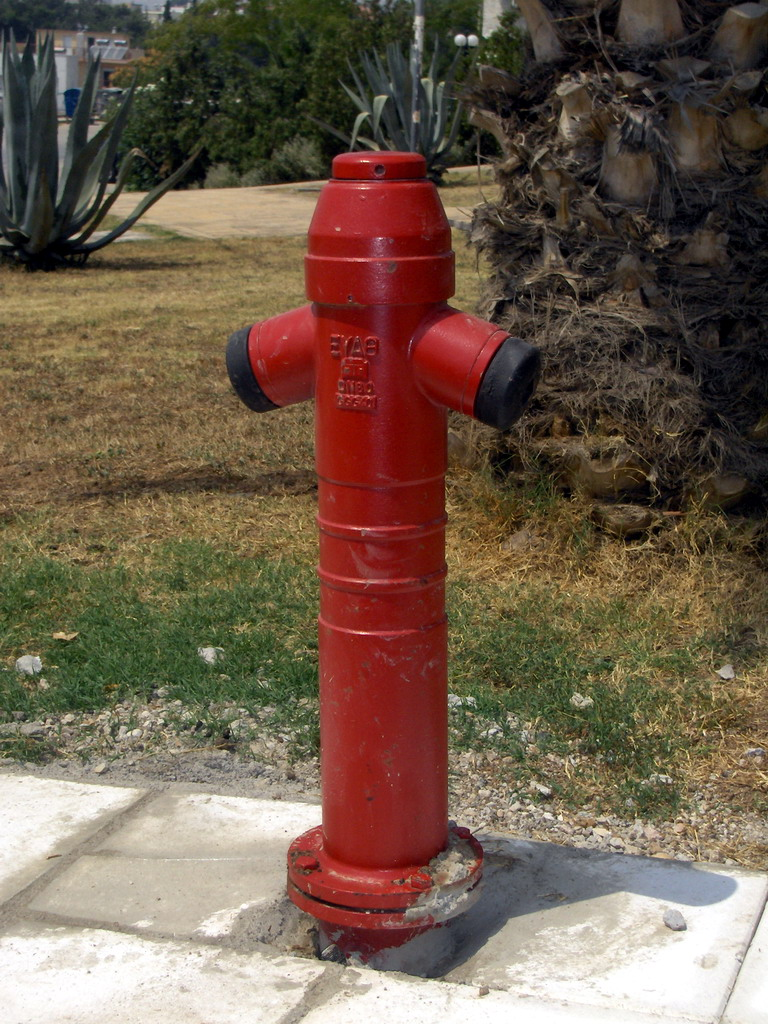
Greek example

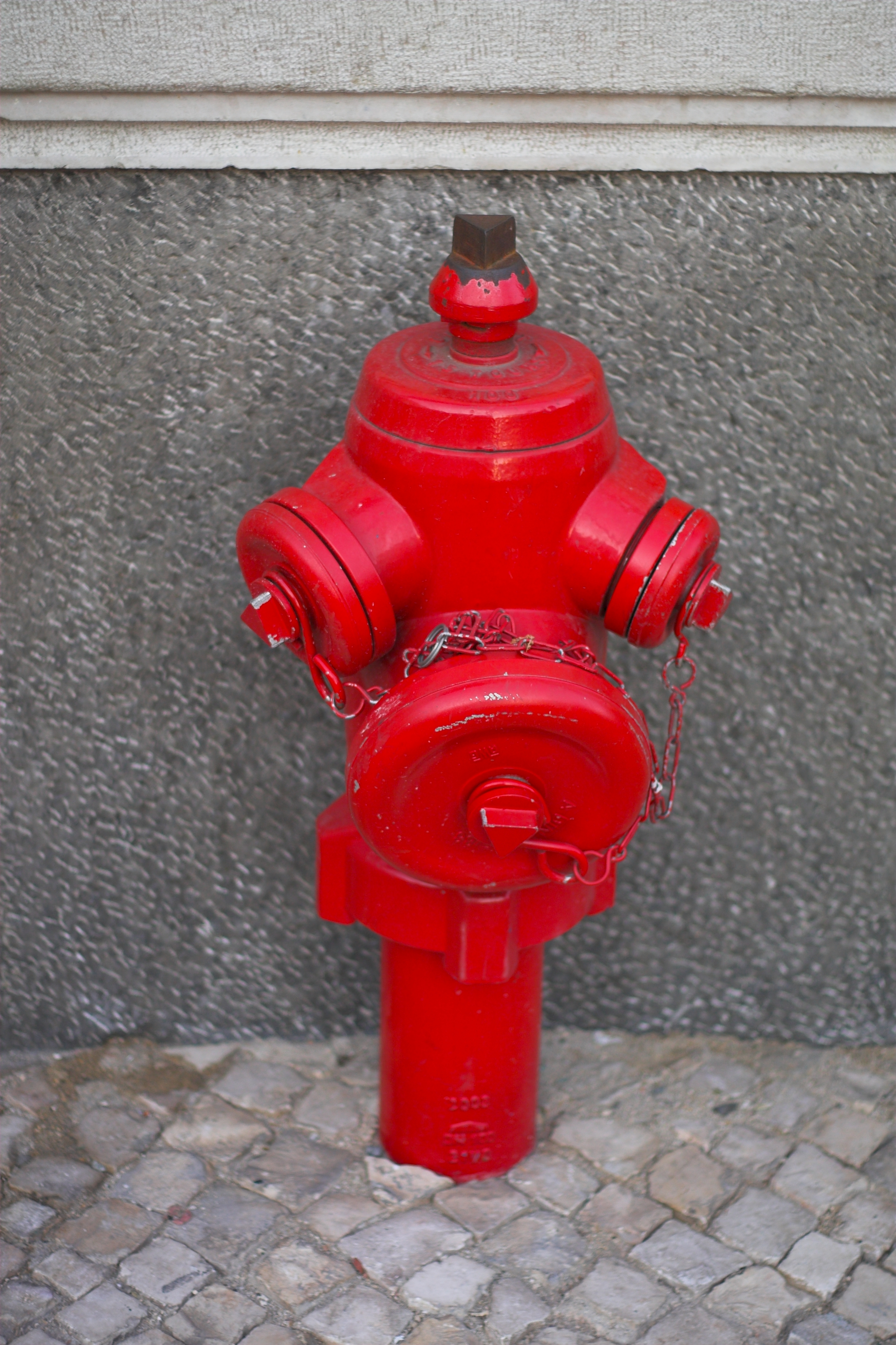
Portuguese example

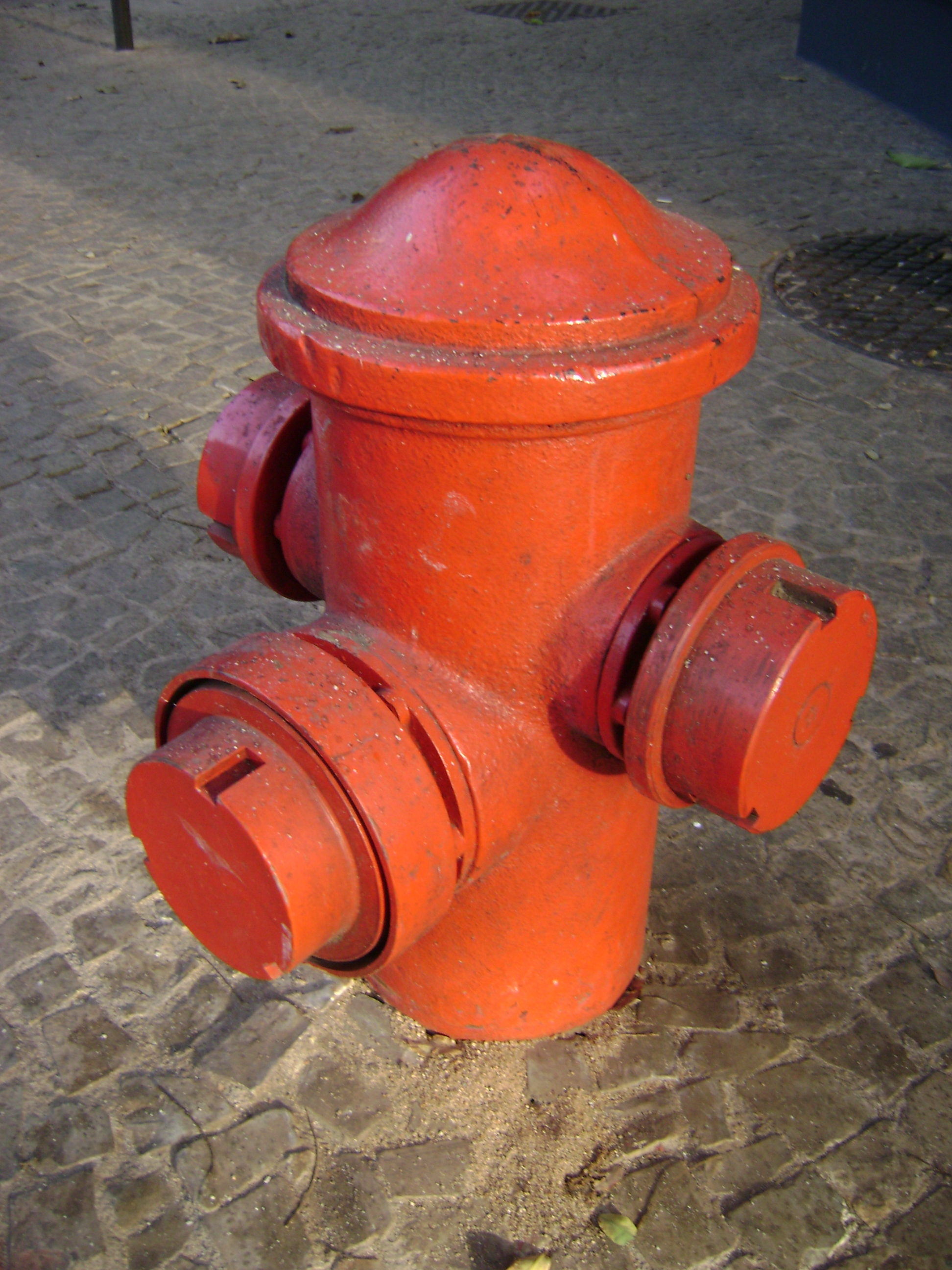
Brazilian example

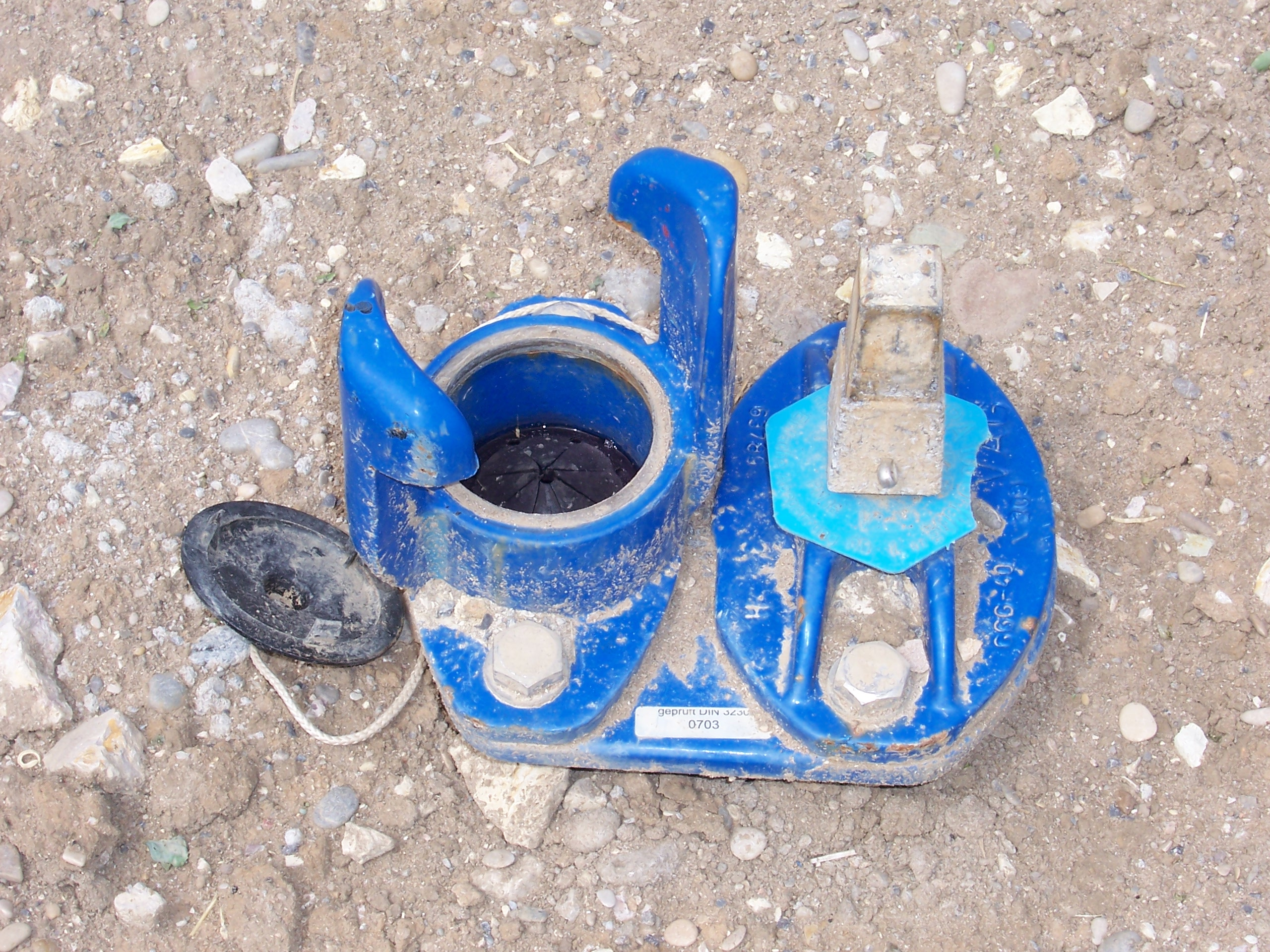
German underground example

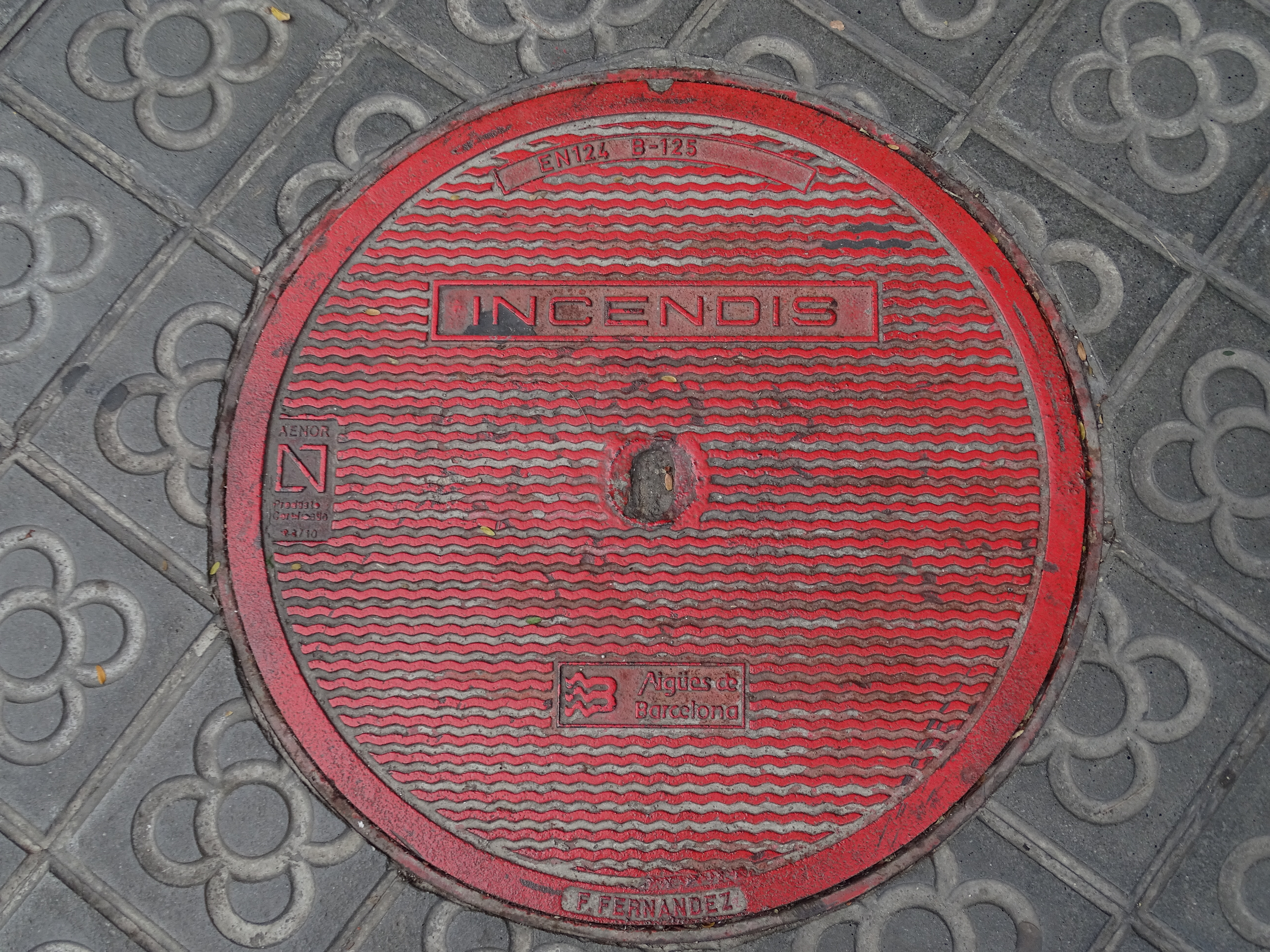
Spanish cover in Barcelona, Spain

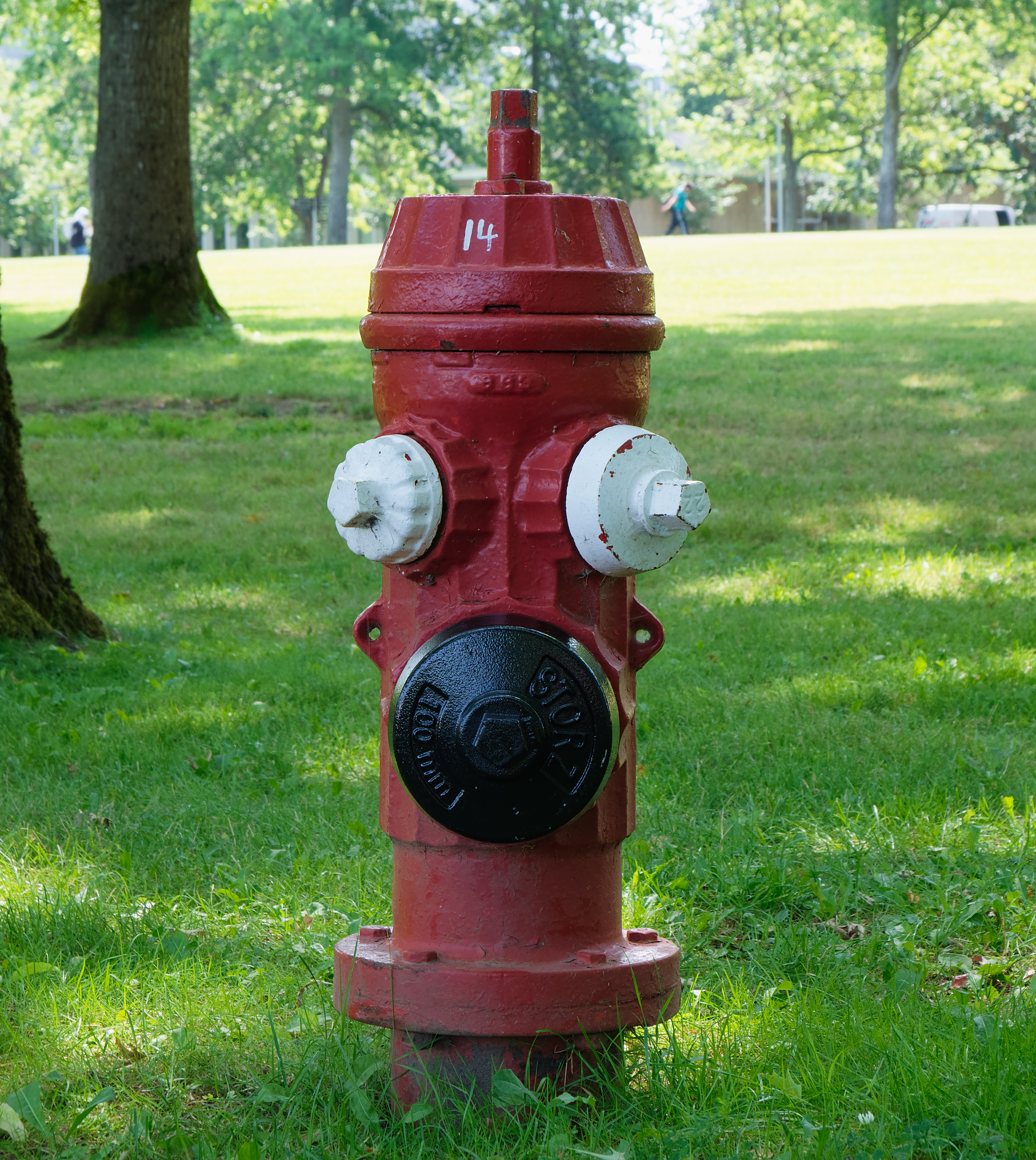
Fire hydrant in British Columbia

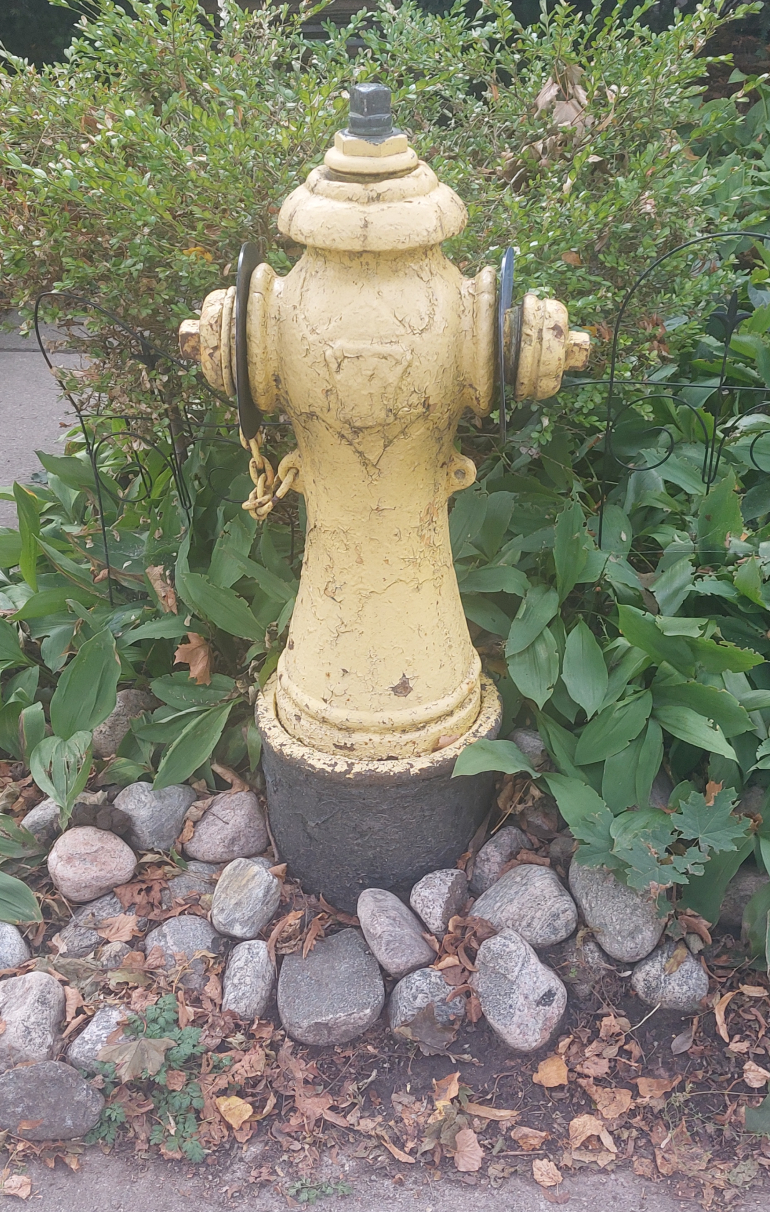
"Mae West" fire hydrant in Toronto, Canada

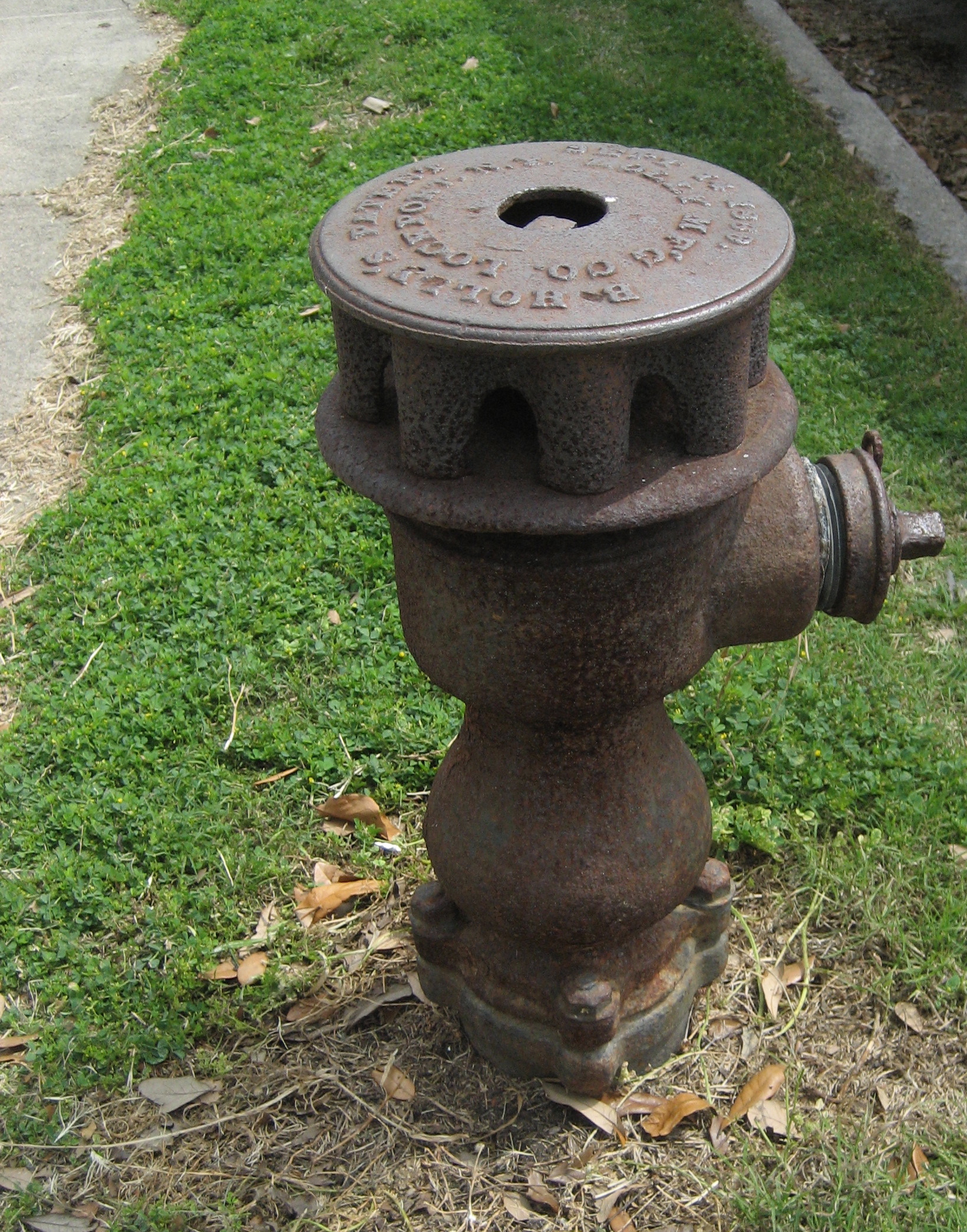
Birdsill Holly hydrant side view from city water supply pipeline right-of-way land

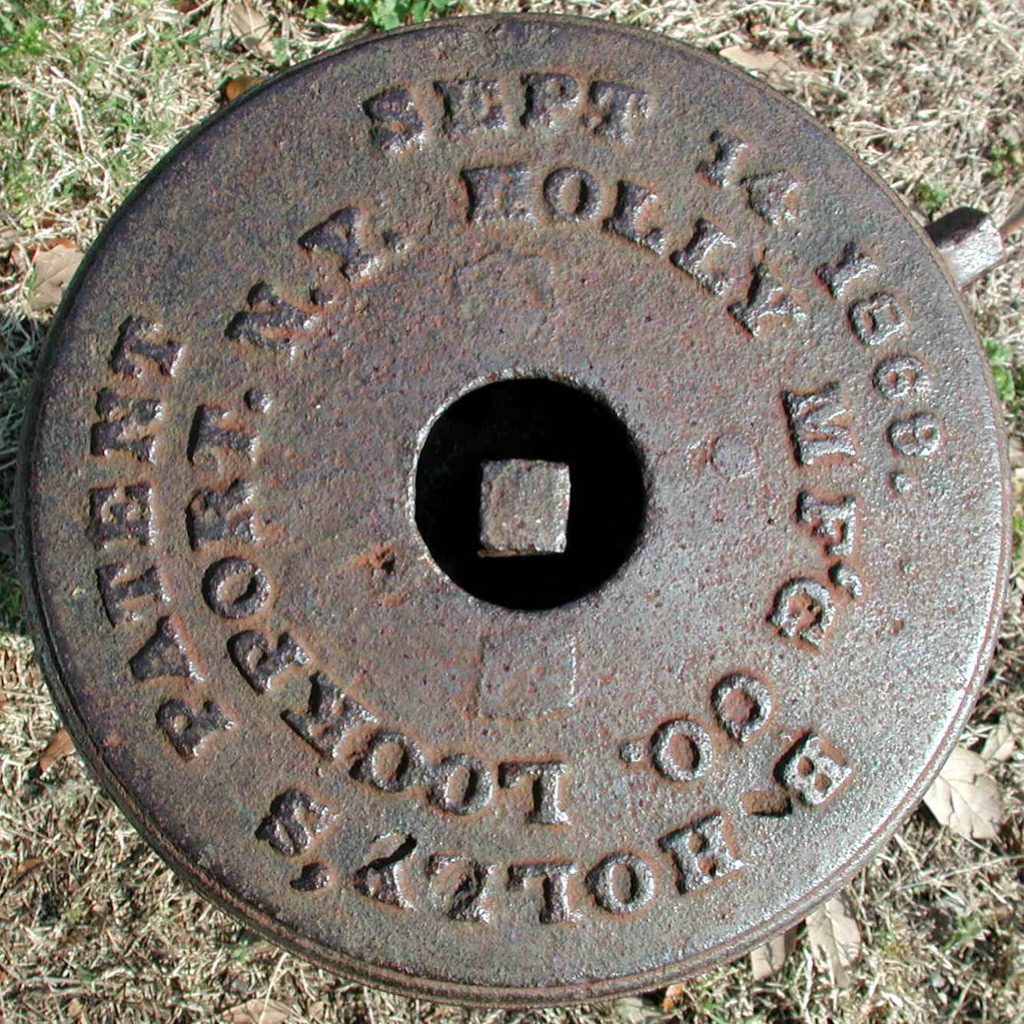
Birdsill Holly hydrant top view with description and patent date information

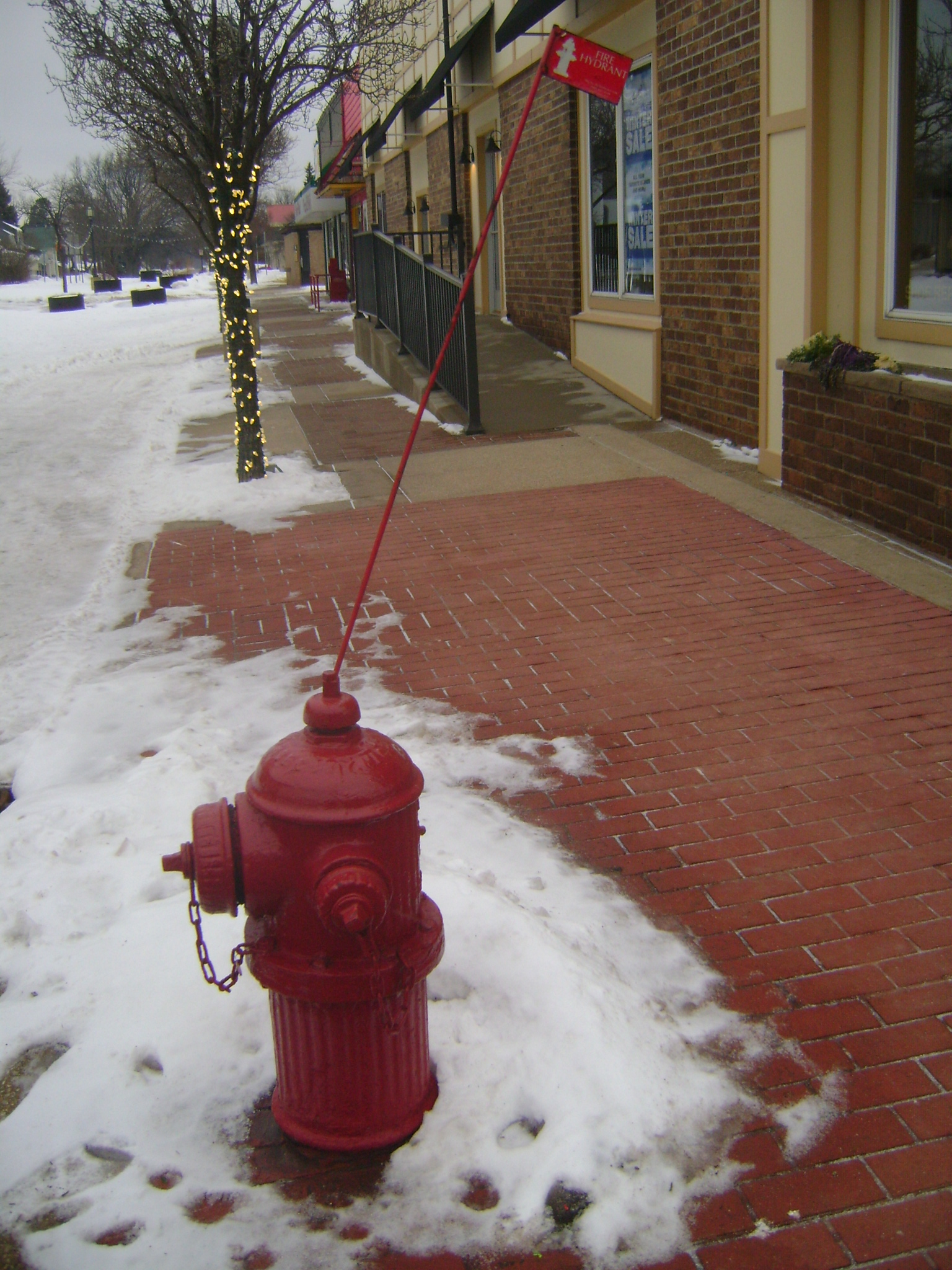
2016 modern fire hydrant

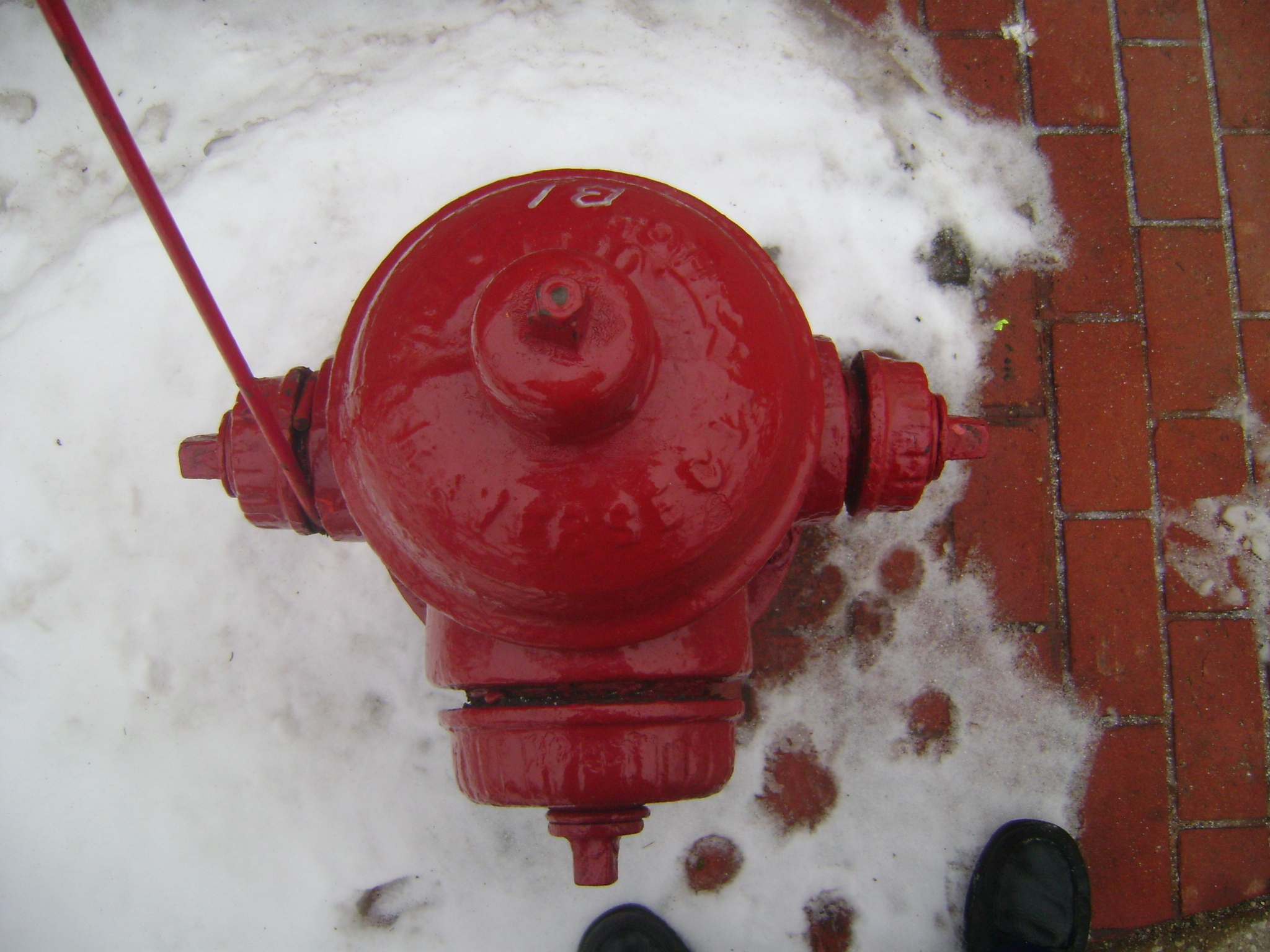
Forward hydrant nozzle

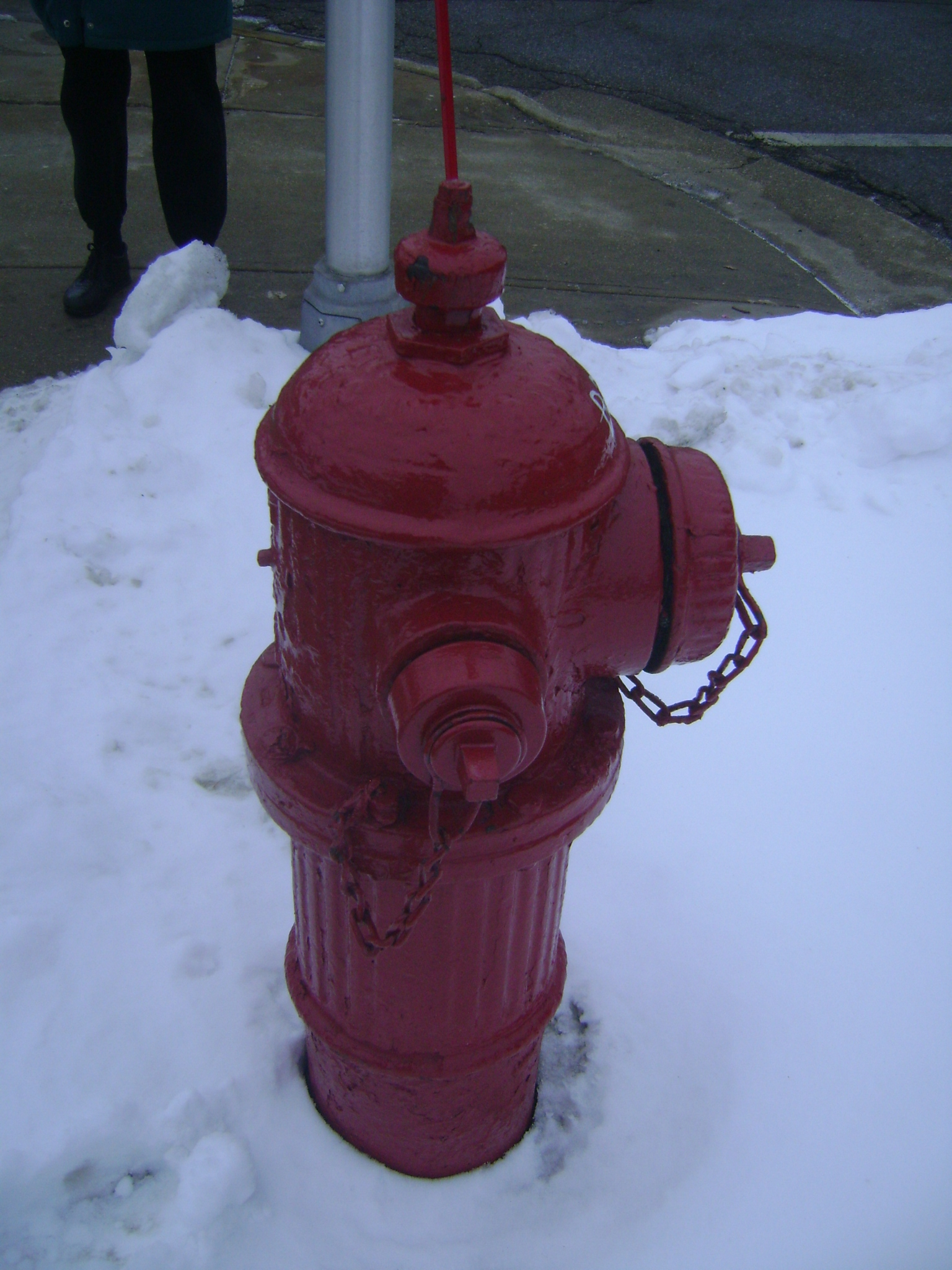
Hydrant nozzle side view

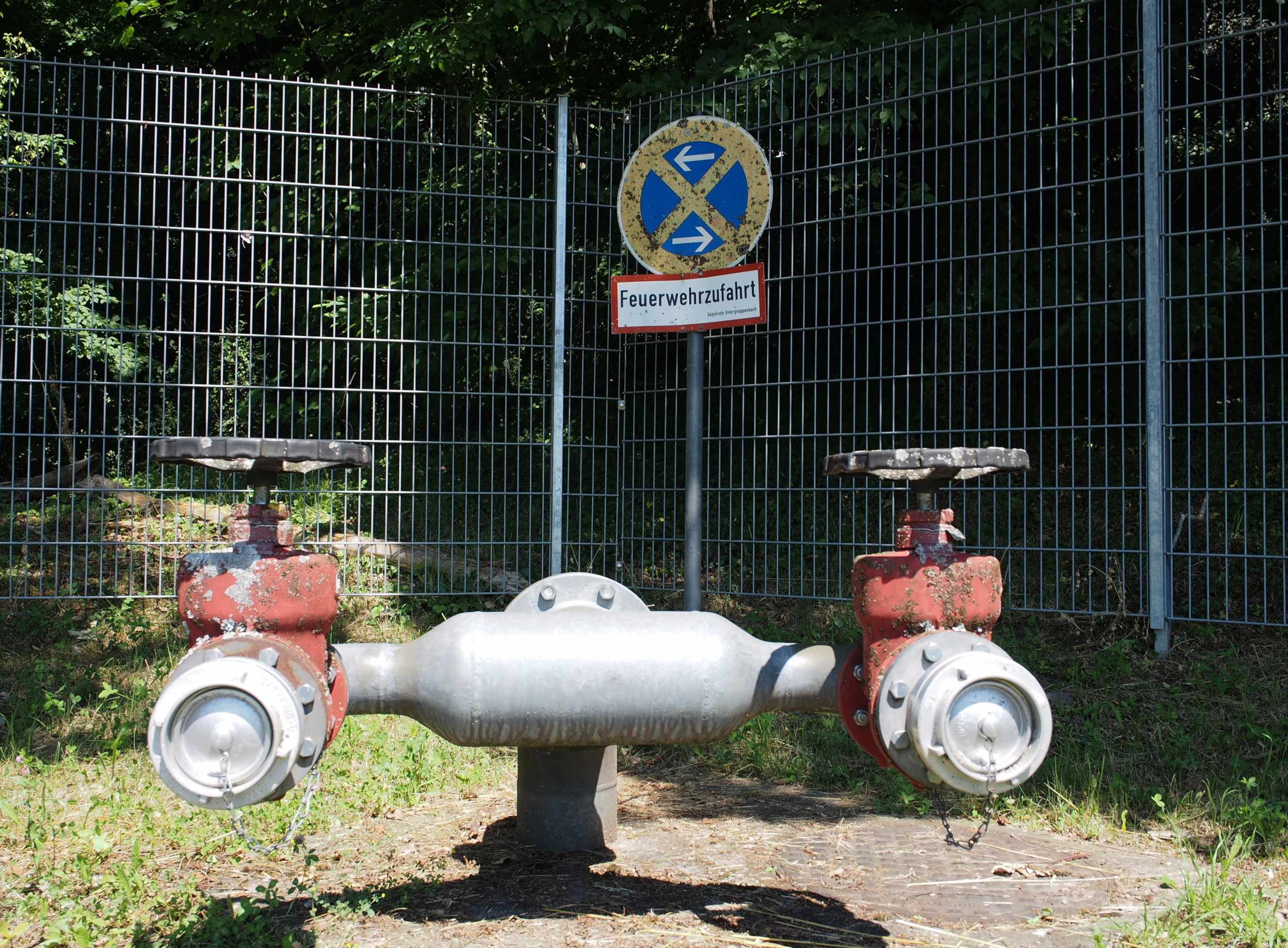
Big pipe hydrant

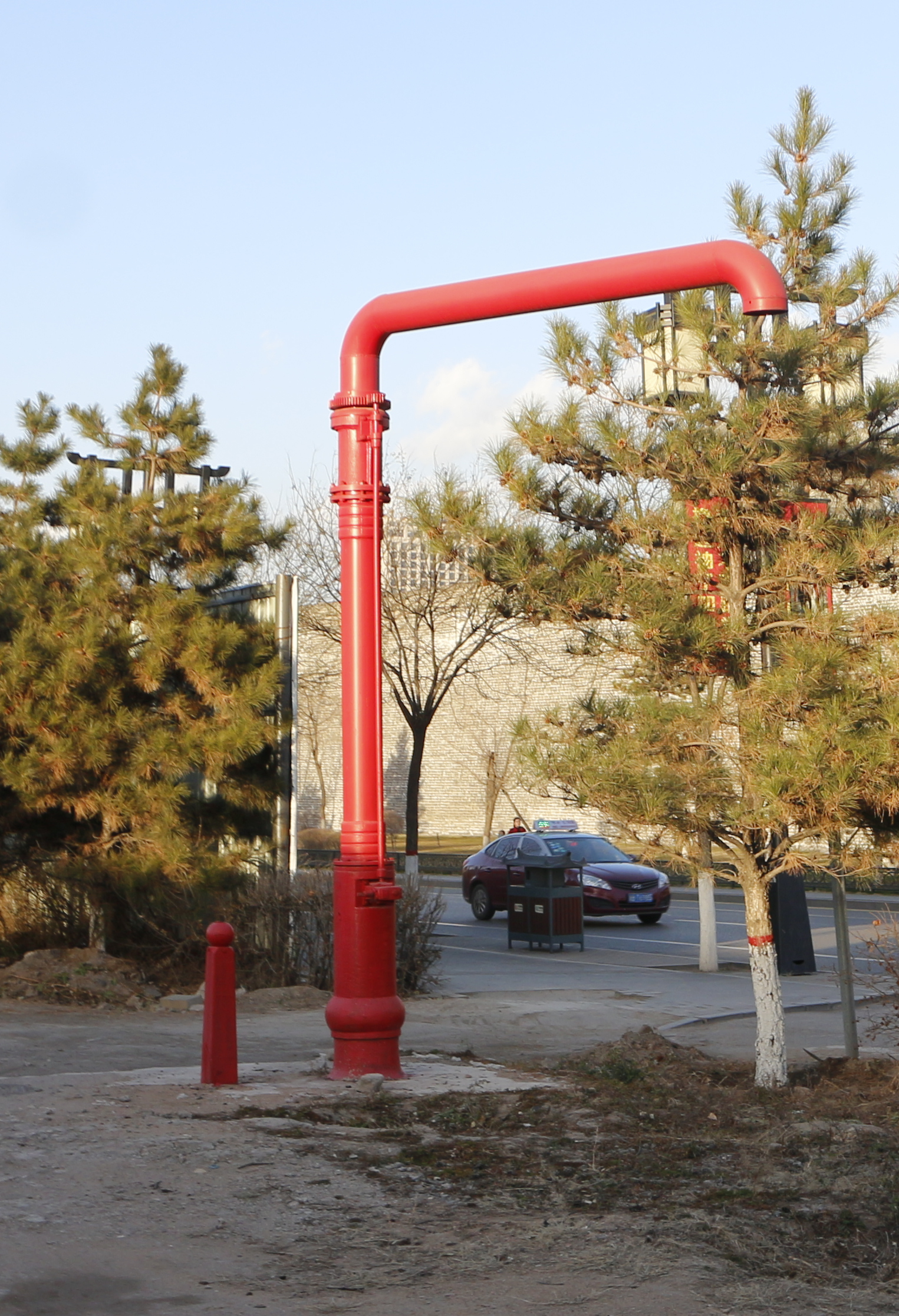
Combination fire hydrant and water crane in Datong, China

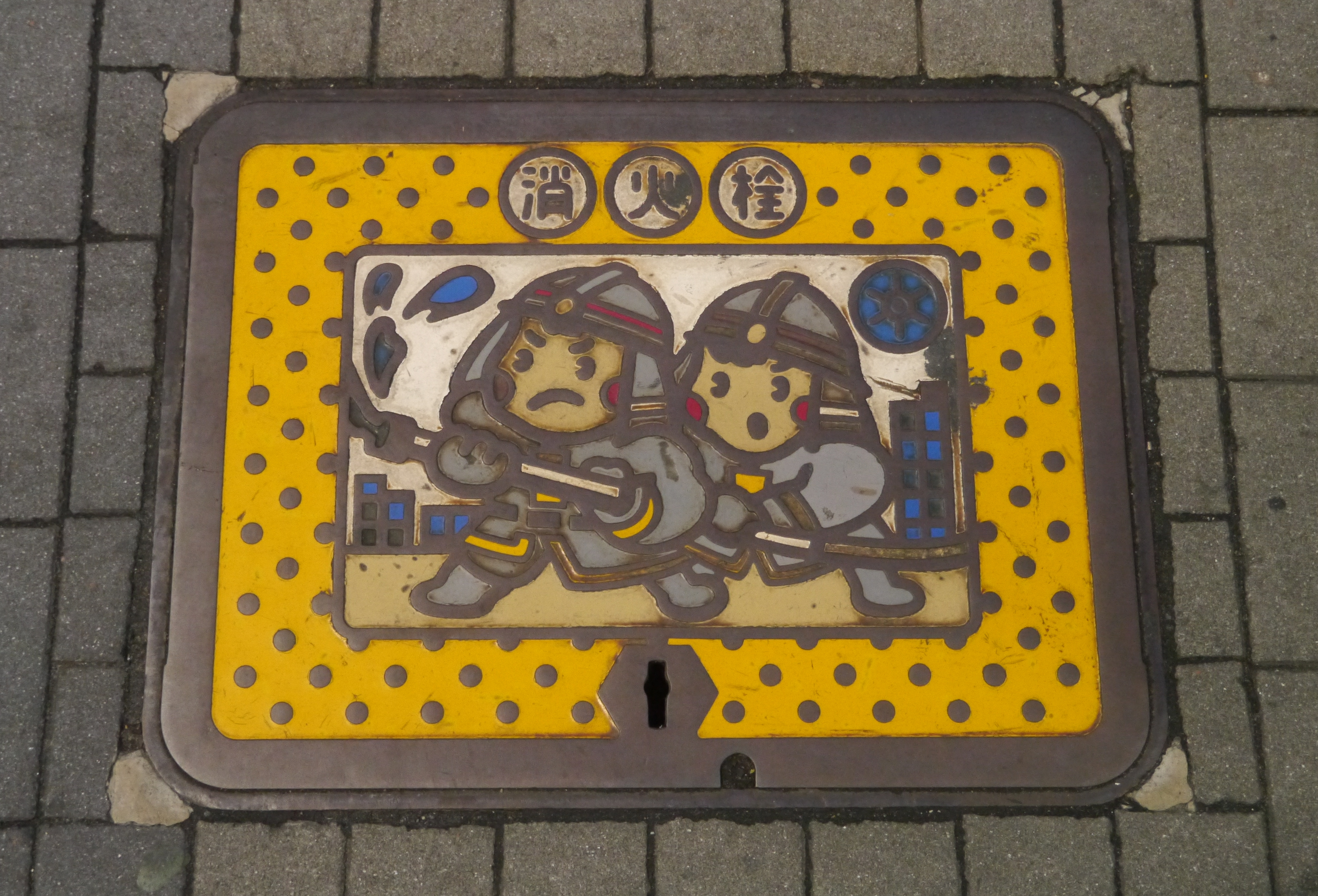
Kawaii fire hydrant cover in Shinbashi, Tokyo

== See also ==
- Active fire protection
- Birdsill Holly
- Fire extinguisher
- Fire hose
- Fire protection
- Fire sprinkler
- Flushing hydrant
- Hydrant wrench
- Portable water tank
- Under snow locators

== Sources ==
- Hinds, Conrade C. (9 October 2012). The Great Columbus Experiment of 1908: Waterworks that Changed the World. Arcadia Publishing. ISBN 978-1-61423-685-6.
- (29/5/2024) https://www.thesaurus.com/browse/fire-hydrant
