= Flushing hydrant =

A flushing hydrant is a hydrant that is used for flushing a water line of silt, rust, debris, or stagnant water. Many water utilities use standard fire hydrants for flushing their lines. Specialized flushing hydrants are often smaller and less expensive than a fire hydrant to reduce cost where fire fighting use is not needed or practical. Many flushing hydrants are "unidirectional": they only have one outlet, in contrast to fire hydrants, which normally have two or three.

Flushing hydrants are commonly installed at the end of dead-end water lines.

== See also ==
- Fire hydrant
