= Steel casing pipe =

Steel casing pipe, also known as encasement pipe, is most commonly used in underground construction to protect utility lines of various types from getting damaged. Such damage might occur due to the elements of nature or human activity.

Steel casing pipe is used in different types of horizontal underground boring, where the pipe is jacked into an augered hole in segments and then connected together by welding or by threaded and coupled ends, or other proprietary pipe connectors such as interference-fit interlocking push-on joints. The steel casing pipe can also be set up and welded into a "ribbon" and then directionally pulled through a previously drilled hole under highways, railroads, lakes and rivers.

== Uses ==
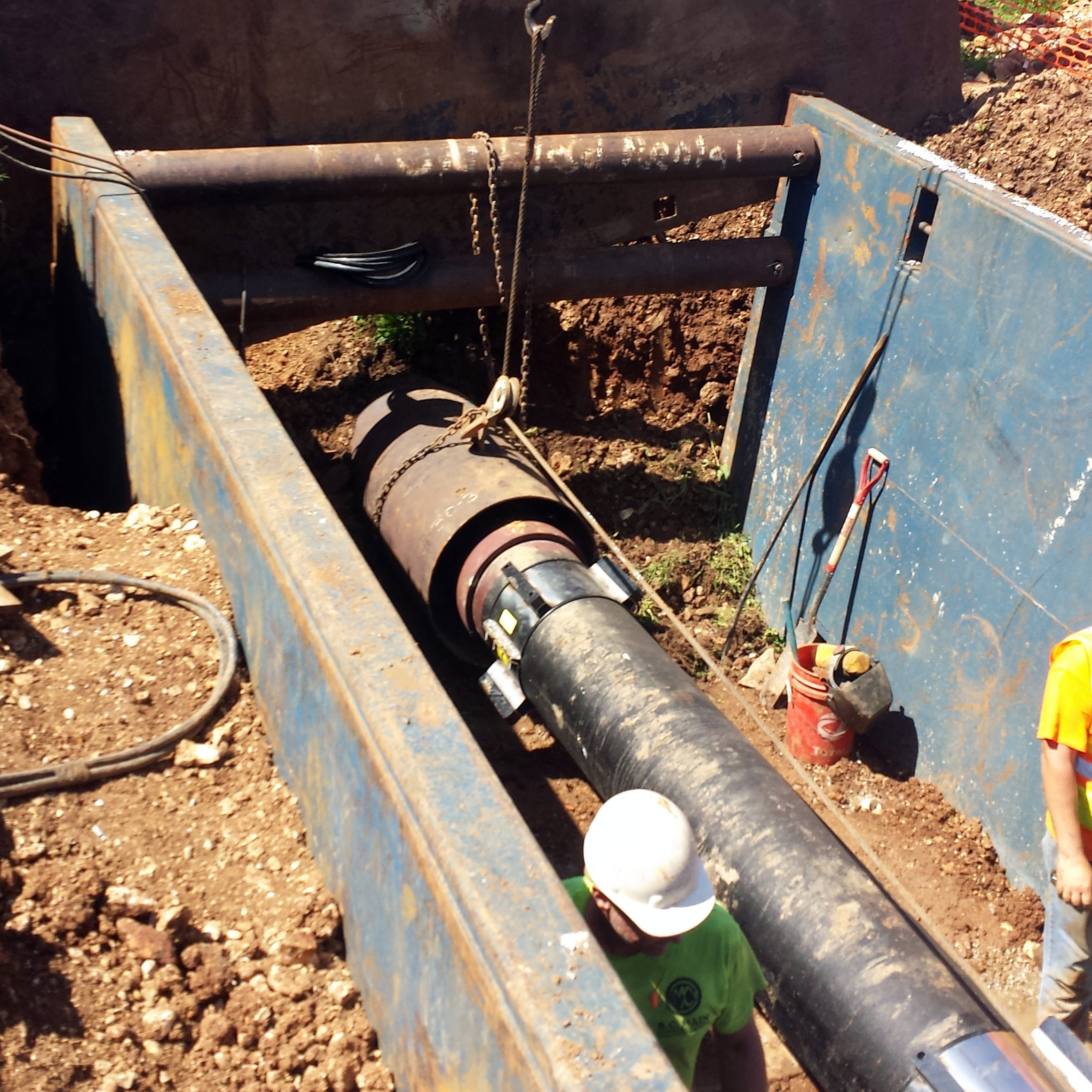
18" ductile iron gravity sewer pipe being installed within 30" steel encasement

Steel casing pipe protects one or many of various types of utilities such as water mains, gas pipes, electrical power cables, fiber-optic cables, etc. The utility lines that are run through the steel casing pipe are most commonly mounted and spaced within the steel casing pipe by using "casing spacers" that are made of various materials, including stainless steel or carbon steel and the more economical plastic versions. The ends of a steel casing pipe "run" are normally sealed with "casing end seals", which can be of the "pull-on" or "wrap-around" rubber varieties. Steel casing pipe is also used in the construction of deep foundations.

== Specification ==
Steel casing pipe generally has no specific specifications, other than the need for the material to be extremely straight and round. In some areas A.S.T.M. specifications may be required by project engineers. The specification most commonly called for is A.S.T.M. 139 Grade B. This specification gives parameters for minimum yield and tensile strength of the steel pipe being used for casing, and tolerances of straightness and concentricity.

Steel casing pipe is often specified as ASTM A-252 which is a structural grade material that does not require hydrostatic testing and the inspection requirements are not stringent and it usually costs less than other grades such as A-53, A-139 or API 5L. Used natural gas line pipe is also used as casing on many projects because it is often reclaimed in very good condition and can offer a significant cost savings when compared to new steel pipe. Used pipe is most likely to not have any testing data associated with it and is generally used when the only required specification is a given diameter and wall thickness of steel casing pipe.

== See also ==
- Microtunneling
- Trenchless technology
