= TRIC Tools =

TRIC Tools, Inc.
- Headquarters: Alameda, California, United States
- Website: trictools.com

TRIC Tools, Inc., headquartered in Alameda, California, is an infrastructure and environmental technology company that designs, produces and sells proprietary tools and systems for the "non-invasive" rehabilitation and replacement of sewer, water, gas and other difficult to access underground pipes.

The company's portable trenchless system is designed to replace pipes with minimal disruption to business activities. It is sold as alternative to the conventional digging of holes in the earth or the destruction of trees, streets and driveways. The company claims that its product has been sold to more than 500 piping and drain cleaning customers in the United States and abroad.

TRIC has been granted several U.S. patents:

- 6,305,880 - Device and Method for Trenchless Replacement of Underground Pipe - Issued October 23, 2001
- 6,524,031 - Device and Method for Trenchless Replacement of Underground Pipe - Issued February 25, 2003
- 6,793,442 - Device and Method for Trenchless Replacement of Underground Pipe - Issued September 21, 2004
- 6,799,923 - Trenchless Water Pipe Replacement Device and Method - Issued October 5, 2004

Patents on the TRIC technology have also been granted in Australia, Brazil, Mexico and New Zealand.

== See also ==
- Pipebursting
