= Hobas =

HOBAS
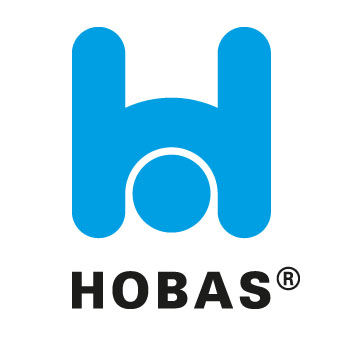
- Company type: Limited company (Aktiengesellschaft)
- Founded: 1957
- Headquarters: Klagenfurt, Carinthia, Austria
- Number of employees: ~ 1000 (2014)
- Website: www.hobas.com

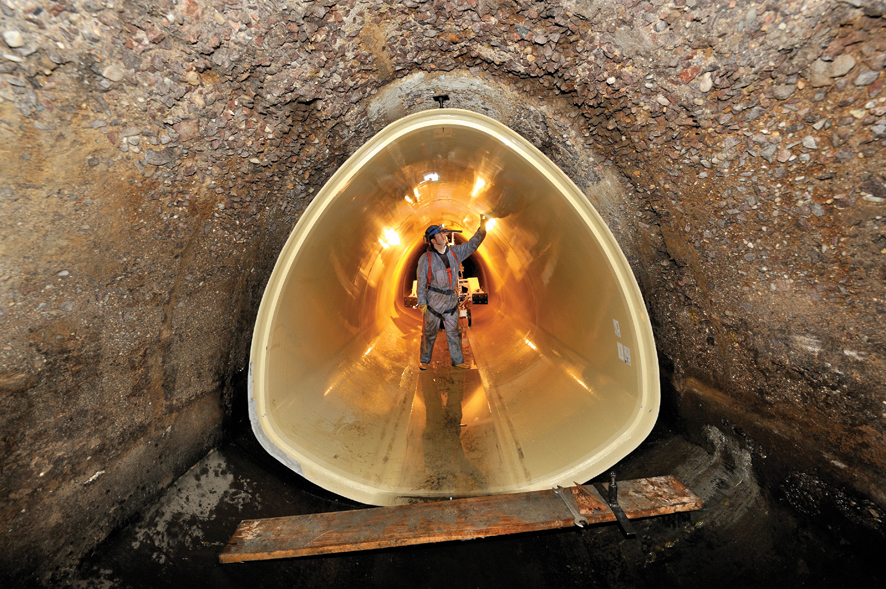
HOBAS NC Line

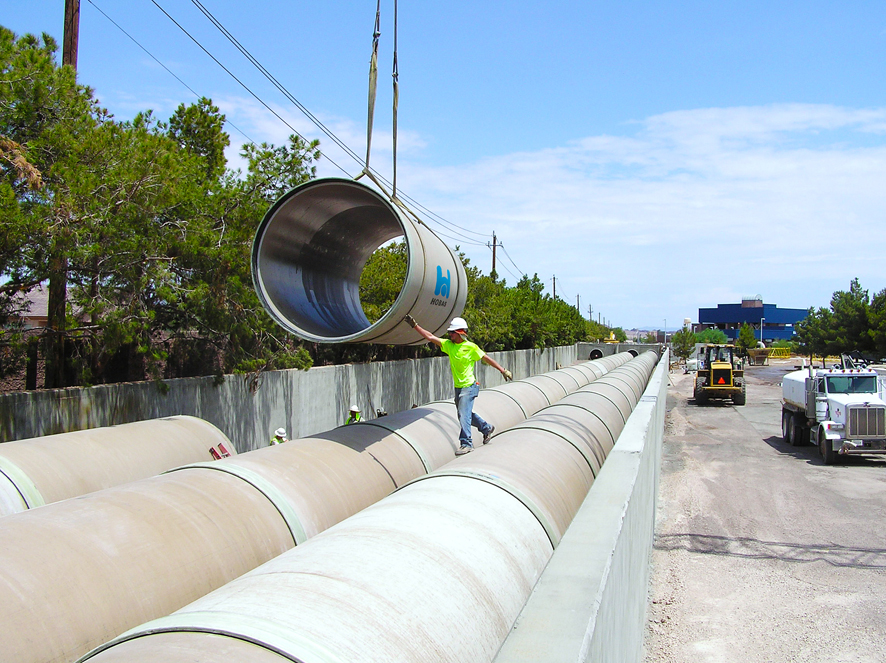
HOBAS Pipeline in Las Vegas

HOBAS is a manufacturer of centrifugally cast glassfiber reinforced (GRP) pipe systems made of unsaturated polyester resin with diameters ranging from 150 mm to 3600 mm. The company was founded in Basel, Switzerland in 1957. In 1977 the Wietersdorfer Group acquired the license for the pipe production in Austria and became owner of HOBAS to 50% in 1987. HOBAS is fully owned by the Wietersdorfer Group since 2011.

In 2014, HOBAS Pipe Systems have been installed in more than 100 countries all around the world. The HOBAS Network consists of production plants and sales offices in Europe, North- and South America, Asia, Australia and Africa as well as international business partners.

== Products ==
HOBAS manufactures circular and non-circular (NC) pipes as well as fittings, tanks and manholes from GRP. These are utilized in various fields of application such as for example sewer and hydropower systems, potable water lines, irrigation and drainage, as protection and ventilation pipes. They are also utilized as shafts, for flood protection measures and in various industrial applications. HOBAS Centrifugally Cast Pipe Systems can be installed in open trench as well as trenchless by pipe jacking or relining/sliplining, above ground and subaqueous.

== Company history ==
It all began quite modestly at the Basel Dye Works in 1957 where wooden cylinders were employed for the dyeing process. These kept splintering and deforming after some time putting the expensive textiles at risk. Seeking a suitable replacement for the cylinders, the factory's engineers developed a centrifugal casting method using glassfiber reinforced plastics (GRP). Thanks to the method and material, they achieved perfectly concentric cylinders with a precise outer diameter and smooth surface - just as required.

GRP had previously been used for shipbuilding, automobile and aircraft industry. However, its resistance to both corrosion and chemicals also made the material highly suitable for other applications. The Swiss recognized its benefits and soon employed centrifugally cast pipes for conveying water - the pipes laid at that time are still in use today. Step by step, the pipes were improved, the manufacturing process was automated, the product range extended and tailor-made fittings were added to the product range during the subsequent years.

== HOBAS Centrifugal Casting Process and Chemical Composition ==
The products mainly consist of unsaturated polyester resins, chopped glassfibers and mineral reinforcement materials. The HOBAS Centrifugal Casting Process is fully automated.

The pipe wall is built up from the outside inwards in a rotating mold. Once all basic components (chopped glass fiber, resin, and reinforcing materials) have been fed into the mold with the help of a computer-controlled feeder arm, the speed of rotation is increased. High centrifugal forces up to 75 g press the materials against the mold wall. Any trapped gas is fully vented and the raw materials are condensed to a maximum, creating an extremely solid and void free pipe wall. During the final curing phase the mold continues to rotate, ensuring a perfectly concentric form and uniform wall thickness over the entire length. Every single pipe in any available diameter from DN 150 to DN 3600 which is finally extruded from the mold has a consistent outside diameter as well as smooth outer and inner pipe walls that are characteristic of HOBAS CC-GRP Pipes.

== See also ==
- Cured-in-place pipe
