= TT Technologies =

Excavating equipment manufacturer company

- Founded: 1991
- Headquarters: Aurora, Illinois

TT Technologies is a construction equipment manufacturer producing microtunneling and trenchless products.

TTT was founded in 1991, and is based in Aurora, Illinois.

The company received an innovative product award from the North American Society for Trenchless Technology (NASTT) in December 2015 for a mini directional drill called the Grundopit K-keyhole.

The company has been noted for several innovations in low environmental impact tunneling techniques and technology. In 2015, TTT received the 2015 NASTT innovative product award for their minimally-invasive trenchless steerable microtunnel boring technology. In 2018, TT Technology equipment was used to set a North American record for pipe bursting technology when a 0.38-meter (15 in)-diameter sewer pipe was replaced in an environmentally sensitive area of Maple Ridge, British Columbia with a much larger 0.86-meter (34 in)-diameter pipe, without disturbing the ground surface.
