= NASSCO =

NASSCO may refer to:

- National Steel and Shipbuilding Company
- National Association of Sewer Service Companies
