= Insituform =

Insituform Technologies, Inc.
- Company type: Subsidiary
- Industry: Construction
- Founded: 1971; 54 years ago
- Headquarters: Chesterfield, Missouri
- Parent: Aegion

Insituform Technologies, Inc. is a worldwide provider of trenchless technologies for gravity and pressure pipelines. Insituform is a subsidiary of Aegion Corporation.

== History ==
Insituform's inception was prompted by the invention of cured-in-place pipe (CIPP) by Eric Wood of the United Kingdom in the early 1970s. Its name comes from the Latin phrase "in situ form," which means to "form in place." The first CIPP tube was installed in the UK in 1971 and is still in service today. A CIPP system consists of a flexible felt or fiber-reinforced tube impregnated with resin. The tube is inserted into an existing pipeline by either inversion or via a pull-in method. It is then cured with steam or hot water, providing a new jointless pipe within a pipe.

In 2007, Insituform announced that it would exit the tunneling business and seek a buyer for Affolder, Inc.

Insituform acquired two new companies in first quarter of 2009. The Bayou Companies acquisition closed on February 23, 2009. Acquisition of Corrpro Companies, Inc. closed on March 31, 2009.

In 2011, Aegion Corporation was created to serve as the parent company for Insituform, Bayou and Corrpro, along with other acquisitions.
