= Warabandi system =

Water allocation system in Pakistan

Irrigation in Pakistan
- Land area: 881,913km^{2}
- Agricultural land: 39.5%
- Cultivated area equipped for irrigation: 261,267km^{2}
- Irrigated area: 224,689km^{2}

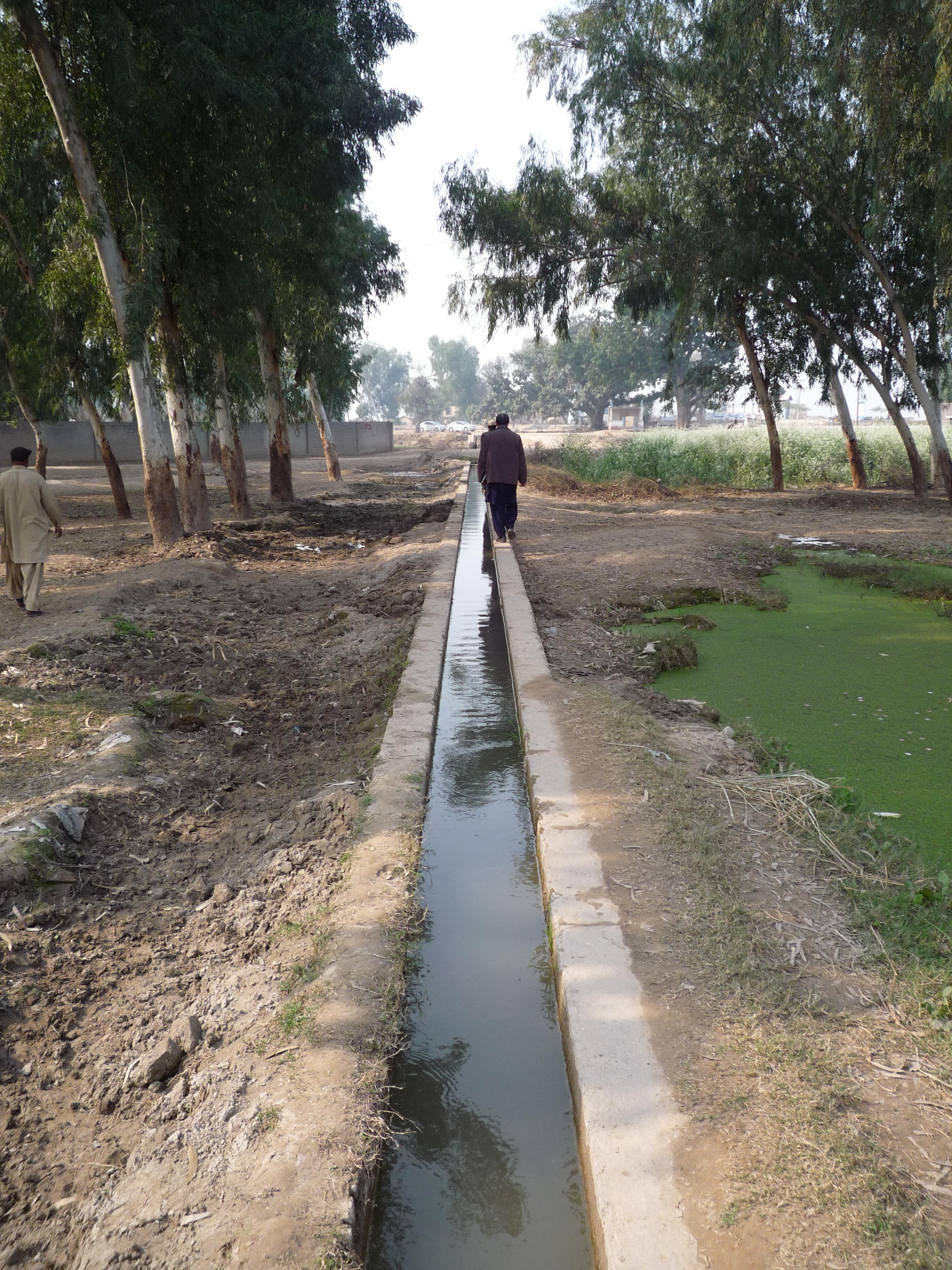
Irrigation in Pakistan

The Warabandi system (Water Distribution System) is a rotating water allocation system in Pakistan that shares irrigation water equally. Farmers can be allocated the same volume of water again after the regular rotation of water, as the operation has three distribution methods for delivering piped water (water pipe) to canal flows. The warabandi system has two primary purposes: highly efficient use of its water supply and equity in water usage. In a country like Pakistan where there is water scarcity, the system helps ensure that every farmer gets equal amounts of water and alleviate food shortages across the country.

== Definition ==
Warabandi is an Urdu word that combines wahr ("turn") and bandi ("fixed)"; the term means rotation of water supply according to a fixed schedule. The Warabandi system can allocate the same volume of water to each farmer on a rotational basis, according to the regular and approved time schedule, which includes the day supply will start and how long the water runs.

== Usage ==
The water is delivered by a rotated watercourse; the warabandi system acts as an integrated management system for delivering water from water sources to the farmer, called nakka. The farmer receives their water seven days after the delivery of the water has started.

Warabandi has three distribution systems. First, the structure of the delivery system is formed by the central canal and two or more rotational branch canals, but the branch canals cannot carry the total amount of water supply on the first delivery. This step is the basic and primary distribution system of Warabandi. Second, the secondary system is formed by a large number of rotational tributaries carrying a full amount of water supply for ensuring every farmer gets enough; it is equitable, since the branch canals deliver water to watercourses after bringing it into the tributaries. The streams form tertiary distribution with the full amount of the supplied water from the tributaries.

The water delivery system cannot fulfill the demand, since the volume of the watercourses is limited, so the delivery procedure continues for about seven days to ensure that every farmer receives water. After seven days, which finishes a period of delivery, the next conveyance starts, to ensure the farmers can get enough water resources to use.

There are two types of warabandi in Pakistan. The most common is called Kachcha Warabandi, which is a system with government intervention, where the farmers make the decisions and plan the schedule by themselves. The time planning for the farmer can be changed if any unexpected situations occur, although the table is predetermined through the farmer's agreement. It can ensure every farmer's water is supplied and the farmer group can manage and distribute the process amicably and collectively with flexible methods. Without government intervention, the decisions are not affected by any outside parties, and the group can focus on who needs water at that time and plan out the entire schedule, which is more comfortable and more flexible.

Another system is Pucca Warabandi, a government program with a field investigation and public inquiry if any situation occurs. However, Pucca Warabandi systems are not the majority, and their number is decreasing. Some people still adopt it because, if any situation occurs, disputes are registered with the canal authorities, and the government will deal with the problem. This method is commonly used by large landowners to ensure the owner's benefit; if any problem occurs, the government can help them solve it. After the prescribed adjudication processes, the system changes to official schedules as a result and become easier to manage as a large landowner.

== Impact ==
=== Advantages ===
The Warabandi system replaced an older irrigation system. In the past, people had used an irrigation system from the British. That system was leaky and outdated, wasting about 95 percent of its water. Since the irrigation system from the British was not suitable, the Warabandi system was intended to be a more efficient replacement. It improved irrigation efficiency, reducing the amount of water farms required by 50-70%. The Warabandi system can avoid more than 50 MAF of water loss during delivery, increasing the water supply for irrigation, as it replaces gravity-based canal flows with a piped water supply. This allows farmers to use less water and grow more crops. The Warabandi irrigation system is not limited by elevation.

The Warabandi system achieved better irrigation discipline and a more equitable water allocation than its predecessors. Water supplies are planned by the farmers, who decide the time and duration of the schedule on which water is pumped. The system is not affected by other stakeholders, who may have conflicting interests. The structure of the delivery system has three procedures; the process typically takes seven days to finish. The procedures ensure every farmer gets a sufficient and proportional water supply for irrigation. The irrigation system auto-feeds a stable water supply when the crops need it. Details of the irrigation are marked on a time schedule, which the farmer can check and supervise, allowing a better irrigation discipline.

The Warabandi system also contributes to the country's economy. As the system raises plantation intensity, crop production increases, and farmers can earn more profits, which increases their working incentive. The gross national product and the gross domestic product increase as a higher cropping intensity, which means the farmer can contribute more to the country's economy. One of the government's considerations is that better irrigation discipline and more equitable water motivate farmers' working incentive because the water supply will not be affected by outside benefit-related factors and farmers can decide everything about the water supply by themselves. If the farmers decide to use "KACHCHA Warabandi", the time schedule is determined by the farmer, and the government does not need to do anything during the procedure. As a result, the government reduces payment for the leakage during delivery through canal flows with piped water.

The Warabandi system is environmentally friendly. Sufficient water supply helps recovery hydroecology. Due to the reduction of water leakage on the delivery, the country gets additional water sources; for example, Pakistan got about an additional 75 MAF of flowing rivers. At the same time, the proper riverine fields keep getting the requisite aquifer recharge, and the riparian ecology and biodiversity have been recovering since they have received enough water. The availability of water in riparian zones helps the plantation of trees near the river, which is sustainable for the environment.

=== Problems ===
The Warabandi system needs a certain amount of capital to fix and maintain after deteriorating. The system has been in use for a long time in every country; for example, Pakistan has used Warabandi since independence, and the system has already deteriorated. The government ought to make an appropriation for fixing and maintaining the system to ensure the follow-up of Warabandi. However, the government may not have enough capital to solve it, and some governments did not provide human resources for maintenance and management. Due to the severe local corruption problem, relevant departments and the government do not have enough capital to carry out maintenance, and those impoverished countries have difficulty maintaining the system's follow-up development. In some places there may not be local staff to understand the relevant skills for maintaining system running. Because of those problems, the underprivileged country's farmers can get a sufficient and equitable water supply at the beginning, but because of the government's insufficient management for the system, farmers always struggle with the system. If the government does not fix it, the efficiency of Warabandi will decline sharply.

Setting up the system and maintaining the system needs a massive amount of capital. Most of the budget amount for system management is allocated to the significant administrative structure to deal with the bureaucratic problems in the operation of the system, while the follow-up maintenance and maintenance cannot get enough funds, with only a small part of the budget allocated. Although the government got enough capital to build up the system, due to the corruption problem, the project cannot finish and maintain its full functionality. When the system deteriorates, water delivery becomes less efficient, making it challenging to ensure equitable distribution for all farmers. The government may not have enough money to deal with the situation because they need to pay a certain amount for fixing it. Not only are funds insufficient, the government also cannot use every capital to deal with the system.

As the population soared, so did the demand for food, but Warabandi cannot fulfill the demand. Especially in deprived areas, where there is not enough awareness of birth control, the proportion of the population is rising much faster than in developed countries. Despite having adequate irrigation systems, the number of operations has always been limited and struggles to meet the rapidly increasing demand for food, and the government may not have the money to build more systems to meet the demand. At the same time, even if the government makes more systems, as the system deteriorates, the government will be unable to maintain the deteriorating system due to corruption, understaffing, mismanagement, and other reasons. In doing so, it will not only fail to meet the food demand but also waste money.

== Characteristics ==
Usually, farm sizes affect Warabandi functionality as the system is small. The area of the farm is limited to around 2 to 5 hectares. The water should be delivered to farms on time because of the planned schedule, and the amount of the delivered water and the water duty should be counted volumetrically.

To ensure the delivery procedure can run smoothly, the main canal separate as upstream or downstream control or a combination of the two methods. There is also a central controlling system, as the farm sets up distributors, flow dividers, or on-off gates. The system as the main watercourse operates at no less than 75 percent of the full supply level to ensure every farmer can get the same proportion of the water. The regular and unauthorized outfalls cannot receive the right to be allocated water from the water sources. The outfalls should not install any gate to ensure those near the outfall can get a proportional volume of water.
