= Aegion =

Multinational Constitution Firm

Azuria Water Solutions
- Formerly: Aegion Corporation
- Type: Private
- Industry: Infrastructure services
- Founded: 1971; 55 years ago
- Headquarters: Chesterfield, Missouri, U.S.
- Area served: Worldwide
- Products: Comprehensive engineering, infrastructure strengthening and protection, shielding technology, pipeline rehabilitation
- Owner: New Mountain Capital
- Number of employees: 7,000 [2026]
- Subsidiaries: Insituform, Corrpro, Fibrwrap, Underground Solutions, MTC, CULY, EN-TECH Infrastructure, C&L Water Solutions and many more
- Website: azuria.com

Azuria Water Solutions, formerly known as Aegion Corporation, is an American multinational company involved in the construction, maintenance, protection, rehabilitation, engineering and design of infrastructure projects for a wide range of industries, including oil and gas upstream/midstream/downstream facilities, power plants, food manufacturing, water, and wastewater.

Azuria's products and services protect against the corrosion of industrial pipelines and rehabilitate and strengthen water, wastewater, energy, and other piping systems as well as buildings, bridges, tunnels and waterfront structures.

== History ==
Aegion Corporation was formed in 2011 to be a parent company for Insituform and affiliates. Aegion was purchased by with New Mountain Capital in a $963 million acquisition, which took the company private.

== Operations ==
The Azuria family of companies include Corrpro, Fibrwrap, Insituform, Underground Solutions, MTC, C&L Water Solutions, Inframark, CULY, EN-TECH Infrastructure and many more.

The company's business activities include engineering, construction, manufacturing, distribution, cured-in-place pipe (CIPP), installation, coating, cathodic protection, research and development and licensing.

== See also ==
- The Allen Group
