= Cured-in-place pipe =

Method used to repair existing pipelines

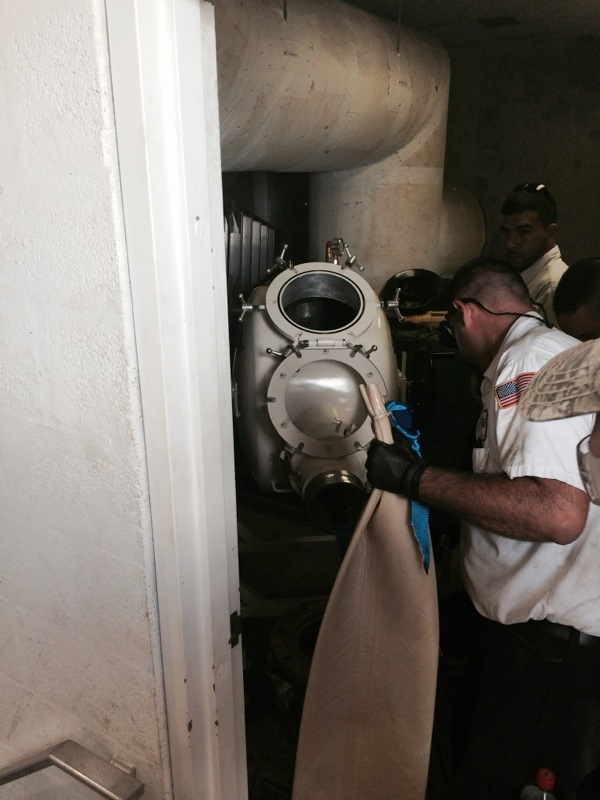
Sewage repairmen inserting uncured liner into a soon-to-be repaired pipe

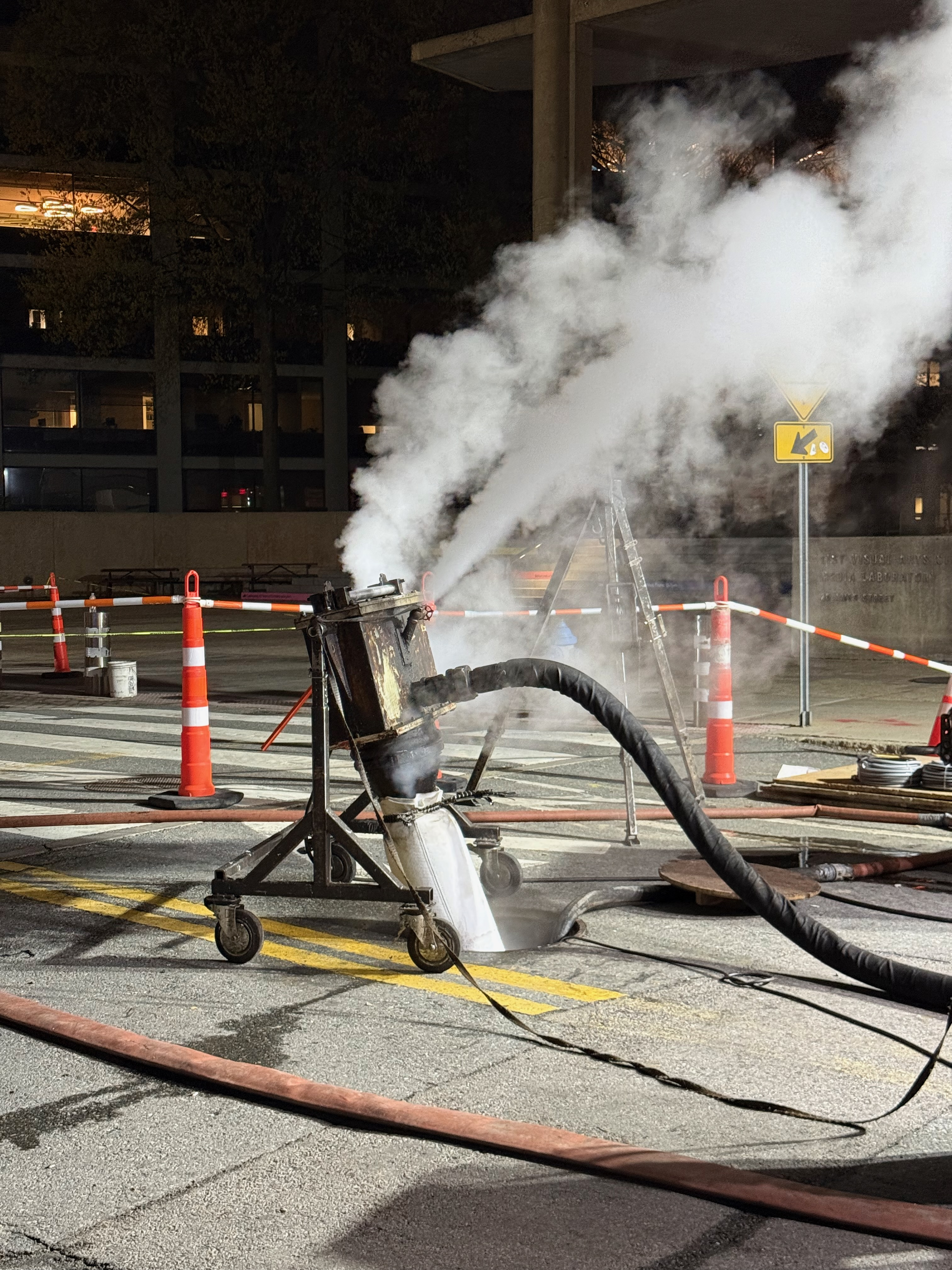
A CIPP liner is inflated with steam and cured as part of a sewer cleaning and lining project

A cured-in-place pipe (CIPP) is a trenchless rehabilitation method used to repair existing pipelines. It is a jointless, seamless pipe lining within an existing pipe. As one of the most widely used rehabilitation methods, CIPP has applications in sewer, water, gas, chemical and district heating pipelines ranging in diameter from 0.1 to 2.8 meters (2–110 inches).

The process of CIPP involves inserting and running a felt lining into a preexisting pipe that is the subject of repair. Resin within the liner is then exposed to a curing element to harden it and make it attach to the inner walls of the pipe. Once fully cured, the lining now acts as a new pipeline.

== Process ==
=== Installation ===
A resin impregnated felt tube made of polyester, fiberglass cloth, spread tow carbon fiber or other resin-impregnable substance, is inserted or pulled through a damaged pipe, usually from an upstream access point such as a manhole or excavation. (It is possible to insert the liner from a downstream access point, but this is more risky). CIPP is considered a trenchless technology, meaning little to no digging is typically required, for a potentially more cost-effective and less disruptive method than traditional "dig and replace" pipe repair methods. The liner is inserted using water or air pressure, applied via pressure vessels, scaffolds or a "chip unit".

=== Curing ===
Cured-in-place pipes require that their resin be cured after installation to achieve full strength, by hot water or steam or, if a fiberglass tube is used, by UV light. As the resin cures, a tight-fitting, jointless and corrosion-resistant replacement pipe is formed. Service laterals, where present, can be reconnected from within the newly formed larger-diameter pipe, by cutting replacement openings using robotically controlled cutting devices, then sealed using specially designed CIPP materials referred to as 'top-hats'. The resins used are typically polyester for mainline lining and epoxy for lateral lines. Since all resins shrink (epoxy resins shrink far less than poly and vinyl ester versions) and because it is impossible to bond to a sewer line with fats, oils, and grease present, an annular space is always created around the new CIPP liner, between it and the host pipe. Some spaces are large enough to require additional work to prevent water from moving along them and re-entering the waste stream, for example: insertion of hydrophilic material which swells to fill the void; lining of the entire connection and host pipe with continuous repair (YT repair) gaskets; and point repairs placed at the ends of the host pipe.

== History ==
=== Conception ===
In 1971, Eric Wood implemented the first cured-in-place pipe technology in London, England. He called the CIPP process insitu form, derived from the Latin meaning "form in place". Wood applied for U.S. patent no. 4009063 on January 29, 1975. The patent was granted February 22, 1977, and was commercialized by Insituform Technologies until it entered the public domain on February 22, 1994.

=== Implementation ===
The process began to be used in residential and commercial applications in Japan and Europe in the 1970s and for residential application in the United States in the 1980s.

== Advantages ==
CIPP does not typically require excavation to rehabilitate a leaking or structurally unsound pipeline. (Depending upon design considerations an excavation may be made, but the liner is often installed through a manhole or other existing access point.) CIPP has a smooth, jointless interior.

== Disadvantages and limitations ==
Except for very common sizes, liners are not usually stocked and must be made specifically for each project. CIPP requires bypassing the existing pipeline while the liner is being installed, which may be inconvenient as, depending on diameter and system used (steam, water or UV), curing may take from one to 30 hours and must be carefully monitored, inspected, and tested. Obstructions in the existing pipeline, such as protruding laterals, must be removed prior to installation. CIPP is not always cheaper than similar methods such as Shotcrete, thermoformed pipe, close-fit pipe, spiral wound pipe and sliplining. The CIPP process may release chemical agents into the surrounding environment. The most common liner material, a non-woven felted fabric, does not go around bends well without wrinkling nor maintain roundness going around corners. Once a line is repaired with the CIPP method, it can no longer be cleaned using cables or snakes; instead, high-pressure water blasting (hydrojetting) must be used.

== Quality assurance and quality control ==
Testing of CIPP installations is required to confirm that the materials used comply with the site and engineering requirements. Since ground and ambient installation conditions as well as crew skills can affect the success or failure of a cure cycle, testing is performed by 3rd party laboratories in normal cases and should be requested by the owner.

Samples should be representative of the installation environment since the liner is installed in the ground. Wet sandbags should be used around the restraint where the test sample will be extracted from. As with any specimen preparation for a materials test, it is important to not affect the material properties during the specimen preparation process. Research has shown that test specimen selection can have a significant effect on the CIPP flexural testing results. A technical presentation at the CERIU INFRA 2012 Infrastructures Municipales Conference in Montreal outlined the results of a research project which examined the effects of test specimen preparation on measured flexural properties. Test specimens for ASTM D790 flexural testing must meet the dimensional tolerances of ASTM D790.

The North American CIPP industry has standardized around the standard ASTM F1216 which uses test specimens oriented parallel with the pipe axis, while Europe uses the standard EN ISO 11296–4 with test specimens oriented in the hoop direction. Research has shown that flexural testing results from the same liner material are usually lower when determined using EN ISO 11296-4 as compared to ASTM F1216.

== Environmental, public health, and infrastructure incidents ==
Testing conducted by the Virginia Department of Transportation and university researchers from 2011 to 2013 showed that some CIPP installations can cause aquatic toxicity. A list of environmental, public health, and infrastructure incidents caused by CIPP installations as of 2013 was published by the Journal of Environmental Engineering. In 2014, university researchers published a more detailed study in Environmental Science & Technology that examined CIPP condensate chemical and aquatic toxicity as well as chemical leaching from stormwater culvert CIPP installations in Alabama. In this new report additional water and air environmental contamination incidents were reported not previously described elsewhere.

In 2017, CALTRANS backed university researchers examined water impacts caused by CIPPs used for stormwater culvert repairs.

In April 2018, a study funded by six state transportation agencies (1) compiled and reviewed CIPP-related surface water contamination incidents from publicly reported data; (2) analyzed CIPP water quality impacts; (3) evaluated current construction practices for CIPP installations as reported by US state transportation agencies; and (4) reviewed current standards, textbooks, and guideline documents. In 2019, another study funded by these agencies identified actions to reduce chemical release from ultraviolet light (UV) CIPP manufacturing sites.

With proper engineering design specifications, contractor installation procedures, and construction oversight many of these problems can likely be prevented.

== Worker and public safety concerns ==
On July 26, 2017, Purdue University researchers published a peer-reviewed study in the American Chemical Society's journal Environmental Science & Technology Letters about material emissions collected and analyzed from steam cured CIPP installations in Indiana and California. To further make the study accessible to the public and CIPP worker community, the study authors established a website and made their publication open-access, freely available for download. Purdue University professors also commented on their study and called for changes to the process to better protect workers, the public, and environment from harm.

On August 25, 2017, the National Association of Sewer Service Companies, Incorporated (NASSCO), which is a (501c6) nonprofit dedicated to "improving the success rate of everyone involved in the pipeline rehabilitation industry through education, technical resources, and industry advocacy", posted a document on its website bringing up several important concerns and unanswered questions regarding the study, and its messaging. NASSCO then sent a letter to the researchers who then responded.

On September 22, 2017, NASSCO announced it would fund and coordinate an assessment of previous data and studies, and an additional study and analysis of possible risks related to the CIPP installation and curing process. Later in September, the NASSCO posted a request for proposals to "review of recent publication(s) that propose the presence of organic chemicals and other available literature relating to emissions associated with the CIPP installation process, and a scope of services for additional sampling and analysis of emissions during the field installation of CIPP using the steam cure process." The request specifically identified the project would review studies conducted by the Virginia Department of Transportation, California Department of Transportation, and Purdue University.

At the federal and state levels in September 2017, on September 26, the US Centers for Disease Control and Prevention (CDC) National Institute for Occupational Safety and Health (NIOSH) published a Science Blog contribution regarding Inhalation and Dermal Exposure Risks Associated with Sanitary Sewer, Storm Sewer, and Drinking Water Pipe Repairs. In September 2017, the California Department of Public Health issued a notice to municipalities and health officials about CIPP installations. One of several statements in this document was that "municipalities, engineers, and contractors should not tell residents the exposures are safe."

On October 5, 2017, the National Environmental Health Association sponsored a webinar about the hazards involved for workers and residents associated with cured-in-place pipe repair. The video can be found here. Several questions about the webinar, and the study have been raised, and feedback noted by industry members.

On October 25, 2017, a 22-year old CIPP worker died at a sanitary sewer worksite in Streamwood, Illinois. The U.S. Occupational Safety and Health Administration (OSHA) completed their investigation April 2018 and issued the company a penalty. Chemical exposure was a contributing factor in the worker fatality.

In 2018, NASSCO funded a study on chemical emissions from six CIPP installations. In 2020, the study was completed. A few locations and worker tasks were identified of potential chemical exposure concern and worksite recommendations were provided.

In 2019 and 2021, the U.S. National Institute for Occupational Safety and Health published a safety evaluations ofUV, steam and hot water CIPP worksites. A UV CIPP company was the first to engage NIOSH. Study results indicated several worker chemical exposure conditions that exceeded recommended limits, and this US federal agency recommended several actions to reduce worker exposures. Two years later, the NIOSH published results of a steam and hot water CIPP worksite study. Results indicated several worker chemical exposure conditions that exceeded recommended limits. The US federal agency recommended several actions to reduce worker exposures.

In 2020, the Florida Department of Health issued their own factsheet about CIPP to municipalities and health departments. The document explained the CIPP process, health concerns, chemicals used and created, how persons living nearby can protect themselves from exposure, and biomonitoring and blood testing considerations after exposure.

In 2022, researchers made several additional discoveries. In the Journal of Hazardous Materials, a study funded by the National Institute of Environmental Health Sciences and National Science Foundation revealed CIPP pressure makes blowback from sinks and toilets in nearby buildings possible and provided recommendations for emergency responders and health officials. Later that year, a study in the Journal of Cleaner Production revealed that by modifying the initiator loading, an ingredient in thermal based CIPP resins, pollution potential of the process could be reduced by 33-42%. Though, also found was that non-styrene CIPP resin contained styrene due to handling at the resin processing facility. In October, researchers discovered that steam based CIPP creates and emits nanoplastics into the air during plastic manufacture. Results of these investigations help better understand the occupational safety, bystander safety, and environmental pollution risks associated with current practices, and also improve technology and practice to reduce undesirable consequences.

== See also ==
- Hobas
