= B-box =

B-box may refer to:

- Beatboxing, a vocal style in music
- Curb box, a plumbing term for a connection to a municipal water supply
