= Bryan Karney =

Canadian civil engineer and academic (born 1957)

Bryan William Karney
- Born: April 21, 1957 (age 69)
- Citizenship: Canadian
- Known for: Research on fluid transients and water infrastructure systems

Academic background
- Education: University of British Columbia (BASc, MEng, PhD)

Academic work
- Discipline: Civil engineering
- Sub-discipline: Hydraulic transients; water distribution systems; infrastructure energy efficiency
- Institutions: University of Toronto; University of Calgary

Bryan William Karney (born April 21, 1957) is a Canadian civil engineer and academic known for his work on hydraulic transients, water distribution systems, and energy efficiency in infrastructure. He is a professor in the Department of Civil Engineering at the University of Toronto and a founding principal of HydraTek and Associates Inc.

According to Google Scholar, as of March 2026, Karney has an h-index of 55 and his publications have received more than 10k citations.

== Education ==
Karney received all his degrees from the University of British Columbia, earning a Bachelor of Applied Science (Honours) in Bio-Resource Engineering in 1980, a Master of Engineering in Civil Engineering in 1982, and a Doctor of Philosophy in Civil Engineering in 1984. His doctoral research focused on the analysis of fluid transients in large distribution networks.

== Academic career ==
Karney joined the University of Calgary in 1985 before moving to the University of Toronto in 1987. He was appointed Professor in the Department of Civil Engineering in 1996.

He has held several academic and administrative roles. From 2009 to 2021, he served as Associate Dean for Cross-Disciplinary Programs in the Faculty of Applied Science and Engineering. He chaired the Division of Environmental Engineering and Energy Systems from 2006 to 2016. He also contributed to the creation of the Energy Systems Option in Engineering Science and led the program from 2007 to 2017.

== Research and professional contributions ==
Karney's research focuses on hydraulic transients, energy efficiency in water infrastructure, and the modeling of complex pipe networks. His work has contributed to the understanding of unsteady flow phenomena in pressurized systems, including water hammer, transient behavior, and the effects of entrapped air in pipelines. He has developed analytical and computational techniques used in the design and operation of municipal water supply systems.

A major area of his research concerns the integration of sustainability and energy considerations into water infrastructure planning. His studies examine the interdependence of water and energy systems, including pressure management, energy loss reduction, and environmental impacts of infrastructure design and operation. His work also addresses system vulnerability, infrastructure aging, and climate change adaptation.

Karney has served as principal investigator on research projects funded by organizations including the Natural Sciences and Engineering Research Council of Canada (NSERC), the Canadian Water Network, and the Social Sciences and Humanities Research Council (SSHRC). His funded research has included studies on smart water distribution systems, transient fault detection, infrastructure investment evaluation, and the role of air valves in system efficiency. He has also examined broader environmental and resource issues, including the sustainability of hydropower and water–energy system interactions.

He has published more than 200 refereed journal articles, as well as books, book chapters, and technical reports. His publications address topics in civil and environmental engineering, applied fluid mechanics, and infrastructure planning. He has supervised graduate students at the master's and doctoral levels and has delivered invited and keynote lectures internationally.

== Industry work ==
In addition to his academic work, Karney co-founded HydraTek and Associates Inc. in 1988. The consulting firm specializes in hydraulic and hydrologic modeling and applies research-based methods to engineering practice. Through this work, Karney has been involved in infrastructure projects for municipalities and utilities in Canada and internationally.

== Awards and honours ==
- 2024 – Sustained Excellence in Teaching Award, Faculty of Applied Science and Engineering, University of Toronto
- 2022 – Innovation Award, Water Power Association of Ontario
- 2016 – Camille A. Dagenais Award, Canadian Society for Civil Engineering
- 2010 – Elected Fellow, American Association for the Advancement of Science
- Multiple Erskine Fellowships, University of Canterbury, New Zealand
- 2009 – Northrop Frye Award, University of Toronto
- Multiple teaching awards, Faculty of Applied Science and Engineering, University of Toronto

== Selected publications ==
- Karney, B.; Simpson, A. (2007). “In-line Check Valves for Water Hammer Control.” Journal of Hydraulic Research.
- Gibson, J.; Karney, B. (2021). “Misbehaving Drinking Water Systems: Risk and the Complex Nature of Failure.” In Palgrave Studies in Sustainable Business.
- Karney, B. (1990). “Energy relations in transient closed conduit flow.” Journal of Hydraulic Engineering. 116 (10): 1180–1196. doi:10.1061/(ASCE)0733-9429(1990)116:10(1180).
- Karney, B. (2000). “Hydraulics of Pressurized Flow.” In Water Distribution Systems Handbook. McGraw-Hill.
- Boulos, P.; Lansey, K.; Karney, B. (2004; 2006). Comprehensive Water Distribution Systems Analysis Handbook for Engineers and Planners. MWH Soft Inc.
- Moradi-Jalal, M.; Karney, B.; Karterakis, S. (2010). “Water Resource Management in Iran’s Ancient Persepolis Complex.” In Ancient Water Technologies. Springer.
