= Water distribution =

Water distribution may refer to:

- Maritime transport
- Water distribution system of a water supply network
