= Spiral welding =

Metal joining technique

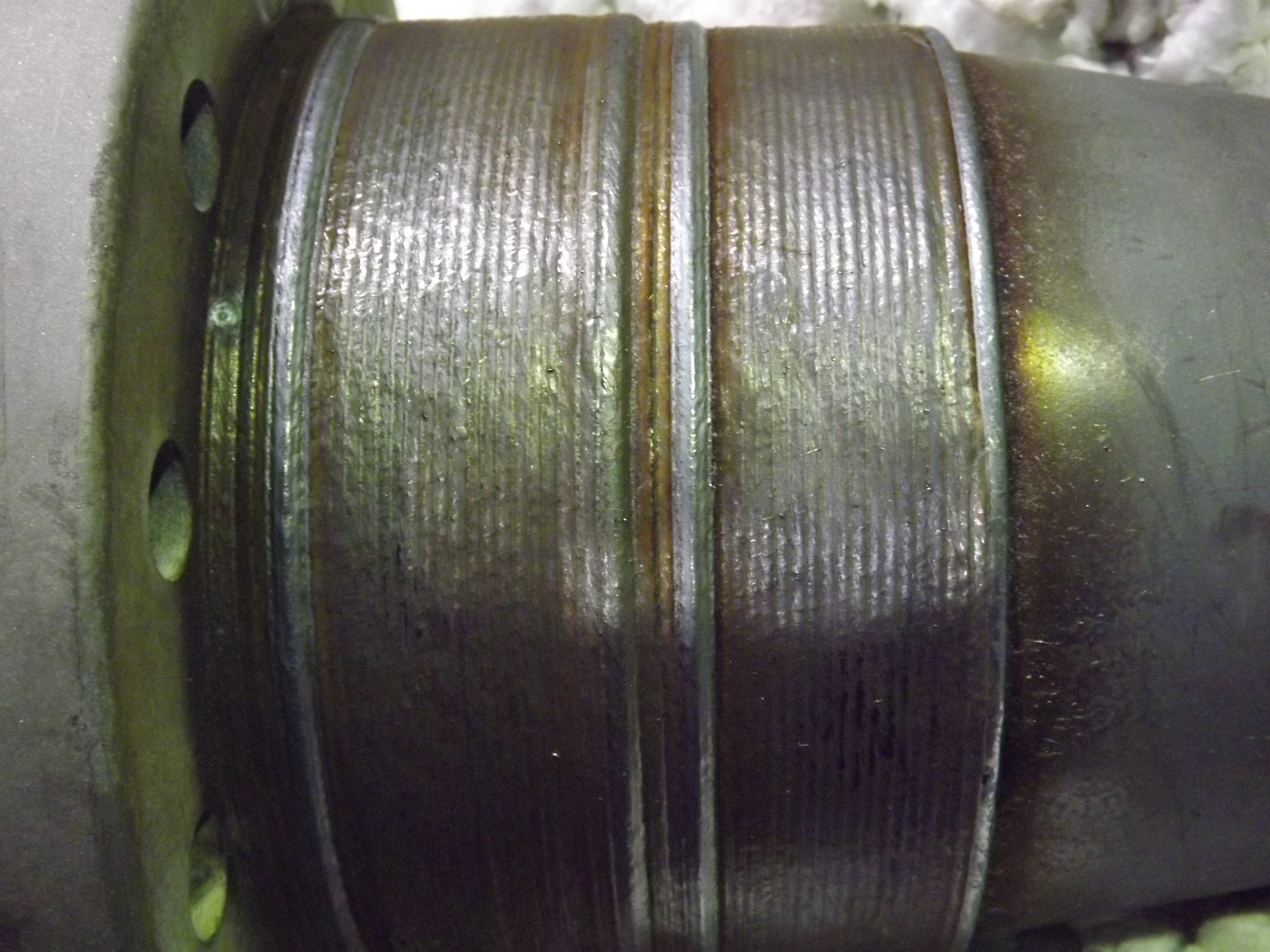
Close up of SpiralWeld® Overlay

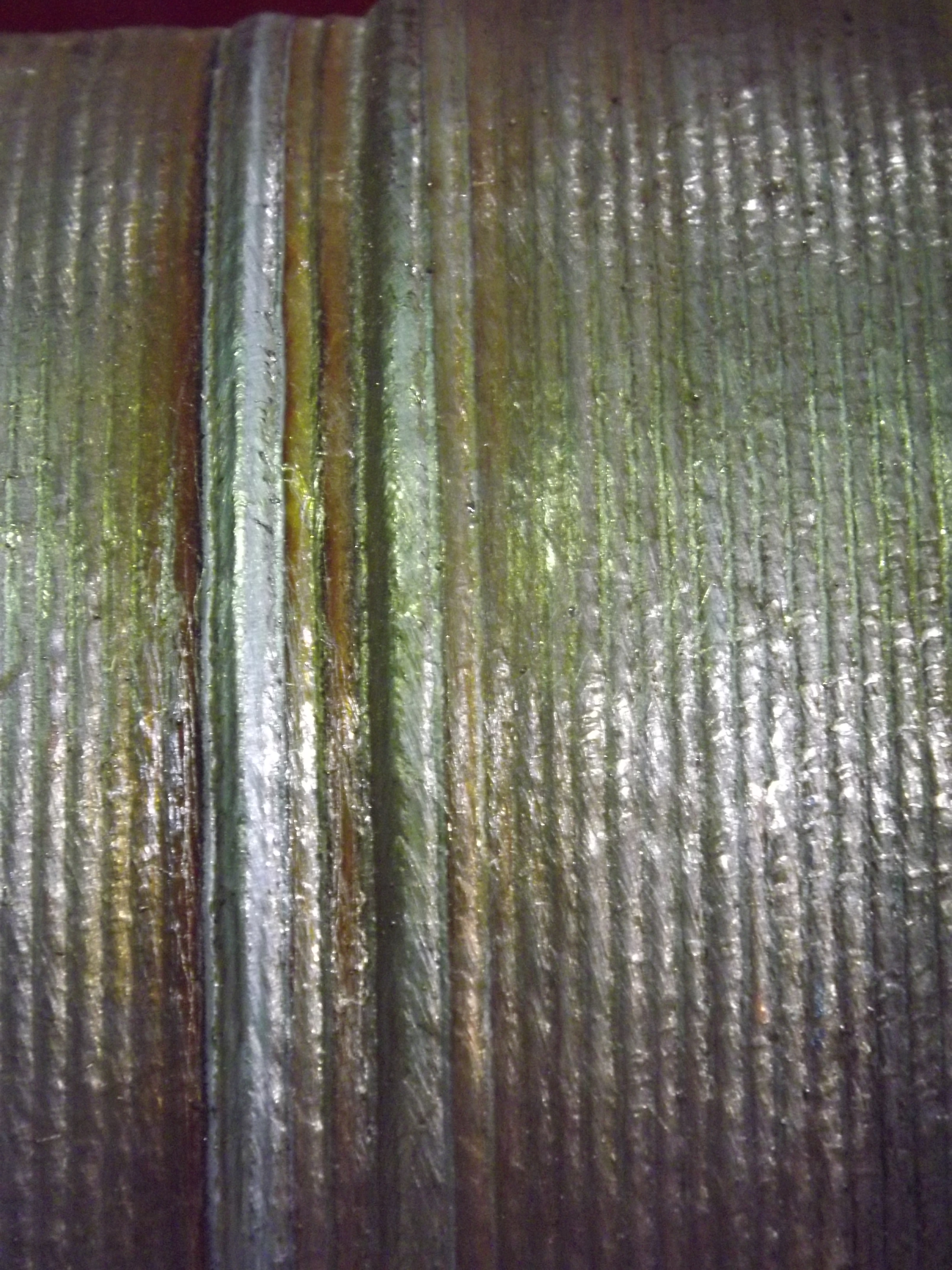
Close up of SpiralWeld® Overlay

Spiral welding is a process where a continuous full penetration metal inert gas weld overlay is used to rebuild damage from wear, erosion, corrosion or cracking, or to increase the dimensions of a component to match an increased dimension on a mating part. Using the spiral weld process eliminates the possible distortion of the component due to unbalanced stresses from normal welding processes. Spiral welding is a low energy input process, during which individual layers of weld and their associated heat affected zones are tempered and the grain structures refined by subsequent and overlapping temper beads.

== Improvements in remanufacture ==
Spiral welding can be used in the remanufacturing process to repair and improve products. Improvements can be made to the component through this process by using a selection of advanced overlay materials; this is based on two broad criteria:

- A match of the parent material with a filler wire of the same or closest available selection material.
- The use of dissimilar overlay materials to give enhanced performance against corrosion, erosion or wear.

Consideration must be given to the post weld grain structure within the weld and heat affected zone. Together with such factors as the difference in coefficient of thermal expansion, the strength and ductility of the two dissimilar materials and the possibility of galvanic action between the two materials, or other connected component. In order to ensure that acceptable levels of local strain are not exceeded at the interface between the overlay and substrate, either during the welding/heat treatment cycle or during service, the relative thermal expansion coefficients must be carefully considered.

An effective pre and post weld heat treatment is vital. The use of pre heat together with a carefully selected surface preparation and the use of low hydrogen, hydrogen tolerant consumable wire eliminate the risk of hydrogen cracking during welding. Post weld heat treatment is used to control the more significant problem of the transformation of the substrate to un-tempered martensitic structure during the process.
