= Curb box =

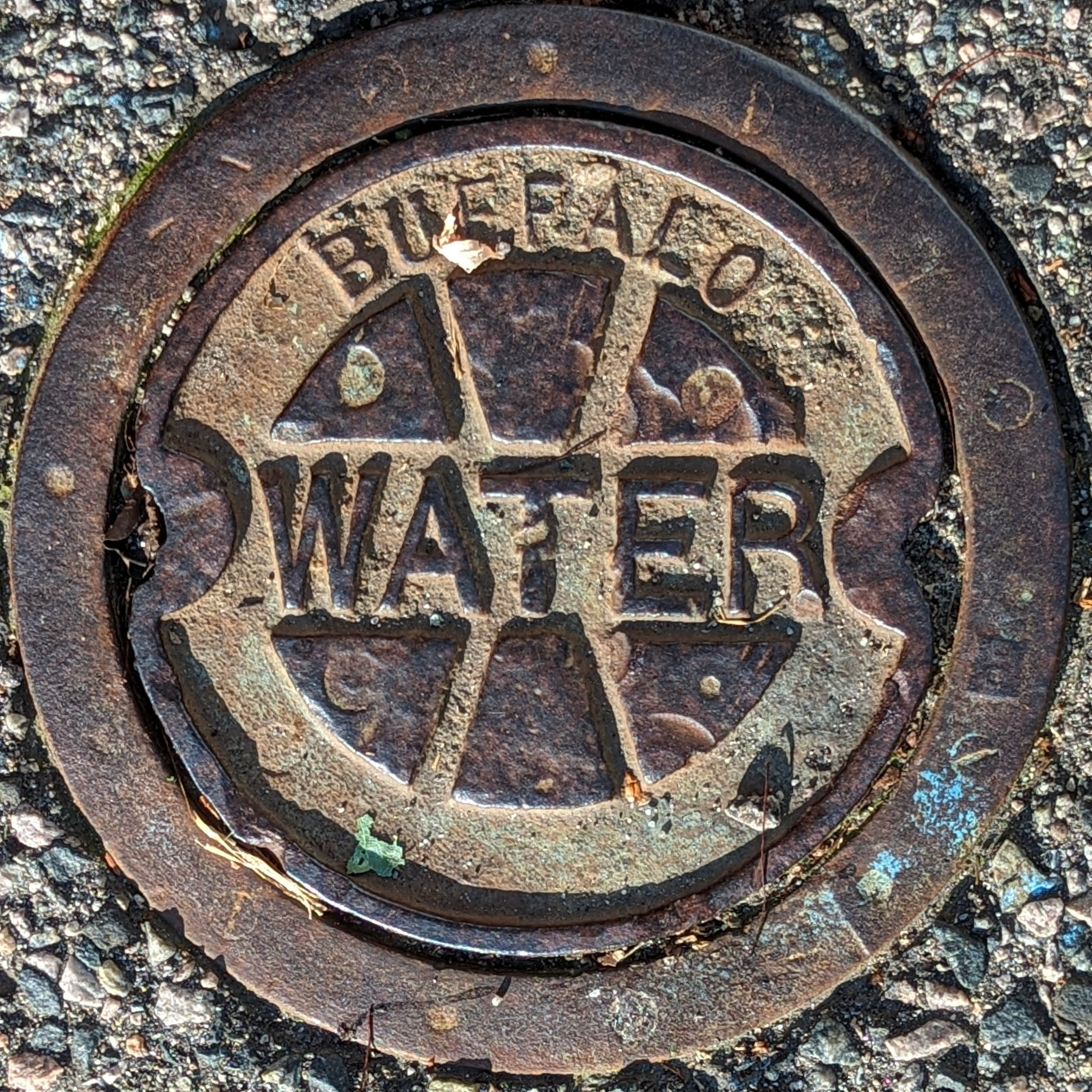
Buffalo box in Cambridge, Massachusetts

A curb box (also known as a valve box, buffalo box, b-box, or in British English stopcock chamber) is a vertical cast iron sleeve, accessible from the public way, housing the shut-off valve (curb cock or curb stop) for a property's water service line. It is typically located between a building and the district's water main lines and usually consists of a metal tube with a removable or sliding lid, allowing access to the turn-key within. It typically serves as the point denoting the separation of utility-maintained and privately maintained water facilities.

The name buffalo box, the first word often capitalized, is applied to curb boxes because they originated in Buffalo, New York.
