= Moling =

In the construction industry, moling is a trenchless method used to lay pipes. During the moling process, a pneumatically-driven machine known as a mole forces its way through the soil along the desired path of the pipe. Moling avoids the need to dig a trench and can be used to lay water pipes and the heating coils of heat pump systems.

Recently moles that are steerable have been developed allowing an operator to correct the track of the mole and to achieve curved bores.

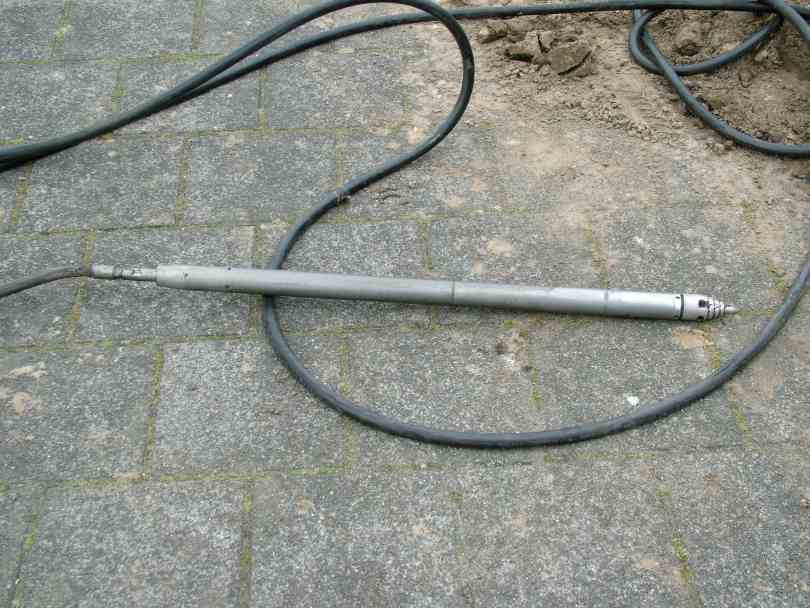
Mole

The standard approach to moling is to dig a hole about 1 m square and 2 m deep. Such a hole is small enough that it can be dug by hand instead of by machine in inaccessible locations. The mole is then entered into the earth on the horizontal face at the bottom of this hole. A destination hole of similar proportions is also dug, and this is where the mole emerges. The mole itself is a steel cylinder about 60 cm long and 6 cm in diameter. It works as a pneumatic cylinder with pulsed compressed air causing the head of the mole to repeatedly hammer against the soil in front of the mole. Once the mole has passed through the earth the pipe can be pulled through the long horizontal hole.
