= The Allen Group =

- Company type: Privately-held company
- Industry: Real Estate
- Founded: 1991; 35 years ago
- Headquarters: San Diego, California
- Key people: Richard S. Allen, CEO; Ken Howell, CFO; Dan McAuliffe, President
- Website: www.allengroup.com

The Allen Group is an American privately held commercial development company, specializing in high-end industrial, office, retail and mixed-use properties. The Company’s major focus is the development of Logistics Parks and Inland Ports, which are located adjacent to some of the most sophisticated rail, intermodal and highway infrastructure in the county. Currently, The Allen Group has more than 8,000 acres (32 km^{2}) under development across the United States, encompassing a wide range of commercial projects.

== History ==
In January 2007, Harve Filuk was named Vice President of Development for California.

In April 2007, the company began development of the Dallas Logistics Hub.

In May 2008, the company completed development of a facility for International Paper.

In January 2009, the company relocated its headquarters to Dallas.

== Projects ==
MRI Global developed high-tech biocontainment pods measuring 44 feet long and 8 feet tall, designed for use during the epidemic of 2014 Ebola crisis. The pods resemble freight containers and were designed to eliminate the risk of carrying contagious disease patients. During the COVID-19 pandemic, additional pods were built to rescue over 300 Americans quarantined on a cruise ship off Japan's coastline. The Allen Group and State Department developed a private-public agreement of $5 million to compensate for this project.
