= Microtunneling =

Tunnel construction technique

Microtunneling or microtunnelling is a tunnel construction technique used to construct utility tunnels from approximately 0.35–4 m (1 ft 2 in – 13 ft 1 in) in diameter. Because of their small diameter, it is not possible to have an operator driving the tunneling machine, so they have to be remotely operated.

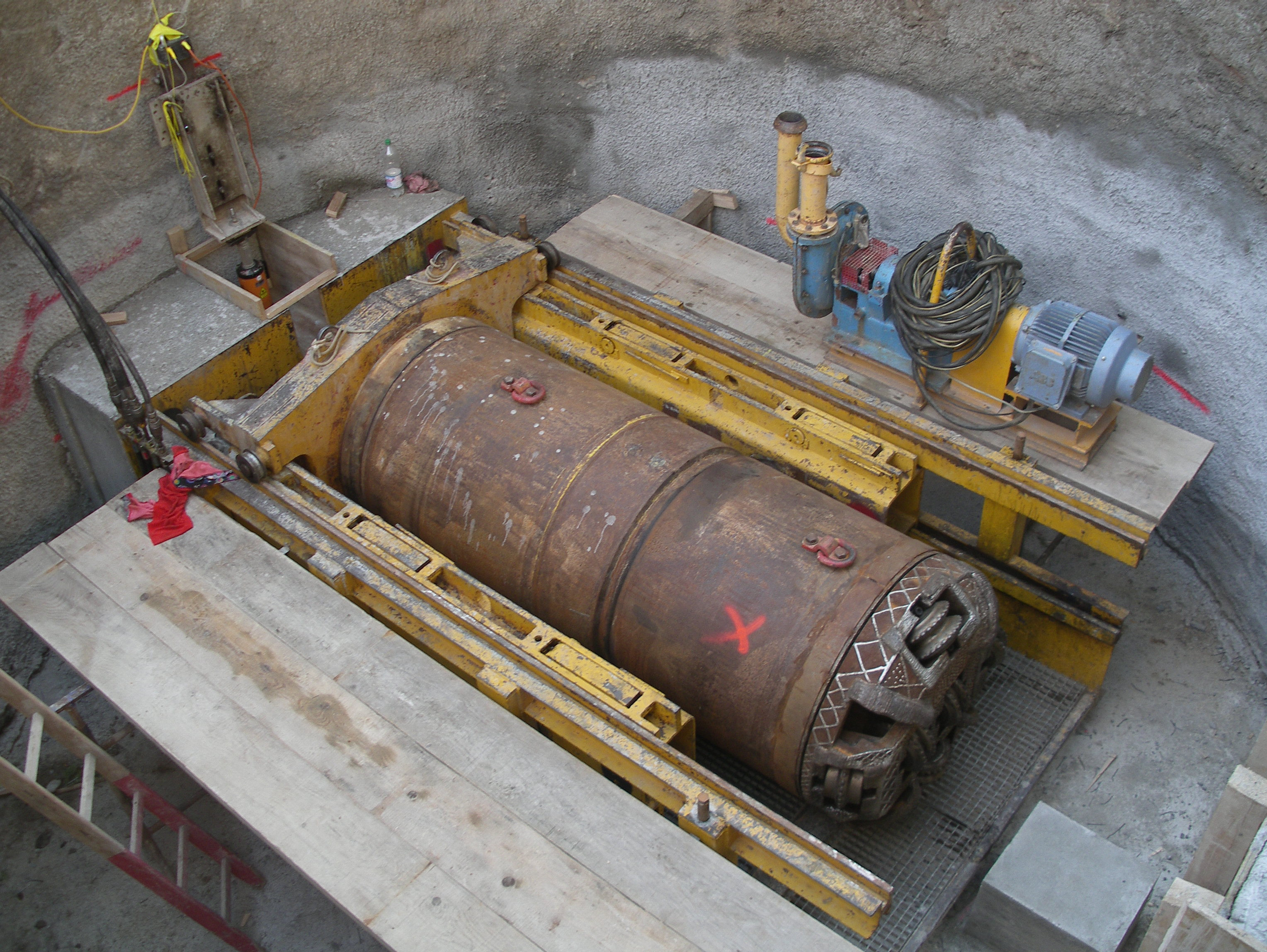
Micro tunnel boring

Microtunnel boring machines (MTBM) are similar to larger tunnel boring machines (TBMs). The MTBM and jacking frame are set up in a shaft at the required depth. The operator monitors the MTBM's location, orientation and hydraulic devices via a computer console, a CCTV camera or Gyro unit. Some systems use video cameras in the jacking shaft and at the separation plant. Gyro Control have generally replaced cameras for location and digital feedback.

== Operation ==
In most microtunneling operations the machine is launched through an entry eye and pipes are pushed behind the machine. This pipe jacking process is repeated until the MTBM reaches the reception shaft at the far end. The speed of the advancing machine is limited to the speed at which the pipe is inserted into the entry eye via the hydraulic rams in the jacking frame.

The friction of the ground around the pipe increases in proportion to the tunnel length. Two practices can minimize this friction. First, over-cutting is used to provide a gap between the inner edge of the tunnel and the outer edge of the liner. The gap is 1/2 to 1.5 inches (13 to 38 mm). A lubricant, often bentonite slurry, is injected into this gap. The pressure of the lubricant prevents the gap from collapsing. Depending on the geology a 35mm overcut may create ground subsidence. For road and rail crossings, this 35mm is reduced to prevent more than 10mm subsidence.

As much as hundreds of tons of force may be required to push the machine and liner forward. The jacking frame containing hydraulic rams produces these forces. The entrance shaft must be strong enough to support the forces it generates.

=== Interjack ===
In addition to the jacking frame, smaller jacks, called “interjacks”, may be inserted between sections of tunnel liner. These push two liner sections apart. Friction on the liner sections between the interjack and the tunnel entrance helps to prevent the liner from sliding out backwards. So while the liner behind the interjack does not move, those sections in front of it receive additional pushing force.

== Thermal cutter ==
San Francisco startup Petra demonstrated a thermal drilling robot that can tunnel through Sioux Quartzite, "the hardest rock on earth" that would normally require dynamite. It can create 18–60 in (460–1,520 mm) diameter tunnels. It disintegrates the rock with a hot, high-pressure spallation head. The machine combines remote control and machine vision and can reverse out of the tunnel. It is claimed to cost 30-90 percent less than other microtunneling methods.

== See also ==
- Trenchless technology
- Directional boring
- Hobby tunneling
