= Post weld heat treatment =

Controlled process of reheating materials

Post weld heat treatment (PWHT) is a controlled process in which a material that has been welded is reheated to a temperature below its lower critical transformation temperature, and then it is held at that temperature for a specified amount of time. It is often referred to as being any heat treatment performed after welding; however, within the oil, gas, petrochemical and nuclear industries, it has a specific meaning. Industry codes, such as the ASME Pressure Vessel and Piping Codes, often require mandatory performance of PWHT on certain materials to ensure a safe design with optimal mechanical and metallurgical properties.

The need for PWHT is mostly due to the residual stresses and micro-structural changes that occur after welding has been completed. During the welding process, a high temperature gradient is experienced between the weld metal and the parent material. As the weld cools, residual stress is formed. For thicker materials, these stresses can reach an unacceptable level and exceed design stresses. Therefore, the part is heated to a specified temperature for a given amount of time to reduce these stresses to an acceptable level. In addition to residual stresses, microstructural changes occur due to the high temperatures induced by the welding process. These changes can increase hardness of the material and reduce toughness and ductility. The use of PWHT can help reduce any increased hardness levels and improve toughness and ductility to levels acceptable for design.

The requirements specified within various pressure vessels and piping codes are mostly due to the chemical makeup and thickness of the material. Codes such as ASME Section VIII and ASME B31.3 will require that a specified material be post weld heat treated if it is over a given thickness. Codes also require PWHT based solely on the micro-structural make-up of the material. A final consideration in deciding the need for PWHT is based on the components' intended service, such as one with a susceptibility to stress corrosion cracking. In such cases, PWHT is mandatory regardless of thickness.

== Application ==
Rate of heating, hold times and temperatures, and rate of cooling are all important variables that need to be controlled and monitored precisely, or the desired effects may not be achieved. When PWHT is mandatory by a given industry code, requirements for these variables will be specified.

=== Heating ===
The rate of heating when PWHT is performed is typically based on the component's thickness and is specified by the governing codes. If the rate of heating is not performed properly, either by heating too quickly or unevenly, temperature gradients within the component can become detrimental to the component. As a result, stress cracks may occur and residual stresses not previously created can form when the component is cooled to ambient temperatures.

=== Holding temperature and time ===
Holding temperature and time are governed by the material and thickness respectively. Regarding material thickness, longer holding times are needed for thicker materials. This is to allow the material to reach a stable condition where the distribution and levels of stresses become more uniform and decrease. The specified holding temperature is one that is at a high enough temperature to relieve high residual stress levels, yet is still below the lower transformation temperature. In addition to the reduction of stress, high hold temperatures below the transformation temperature allow for microstructural transformations, therein reducing hardness and improving ductility. Great care should be taken as to not heat the component above the lower transformation temperature, as detrimental metallurgical effects and impaired mechanical properties can result. In addition, the holding temperature should not be greater than the original tempering temperature unless later mechanical testing is performed. Holding above the original tempering temperature can reduce the strength of the material to below ASME required minimums.

=== Cooling ===
As with the heating rate, the cooling rate must be controlled, as to avoid any detrimental temperature gradients that could cause cracking or introduce new stresses during cooling. In addition to this, rapid cooling rates can increase hardness, which may increase the susceptibility of a brittle fracture.

=== Monitoring technique ===
Thermocouples are typically attached to the component undergoing PWHT to check and ensure that heating rates, hold temperatures, and cooling rates meet code specification. Computer software is typically used in conjunction with the thermocouples to monitor the fore-mentioned variables and provide documentation that the PWHT was performed properly.

== See also ==
- Deaerator
