= Trenchless technology =

Underground construction that minimizes surface disruption

Trenchless technology is a type of subsurface construction work that requires few trenches or no continuous trenches. It is a rapidly growing sector of the construction and civil engineering industry. It can be defined as "a family of methods, materials, and equipment capable of being used for the installation of new or replacement or rehabilitation of existing underground infrastructure with minimal disruption to surface traffic, business, and other activities."

== Trenchless & construction ==
Trenchless construction includes such construction methods as tunneling, microtunneling (MTM), horizontal directional drilling (HDD) also known as directional boring, pipe ramming (PR), pipe jacking (PJ), moling, horizontal auger boring (HAB) and other methods for the installation of pipelines and cables below the ground with minimal excavation. Large diameter tunnels such as those constructed by a tunnel boring machine (TBM), and drilling and blasting techniques are larger versions of subsurface construction. The difference between trenchless and other subsurface construction techniques depends upon the size of the passage under construction.

The method requires considering soil characteristics and the loads applied to the surface. In cases where the soil is sandy, the water table is at shallow depth, or heavy loads like that of urban traffic are expected, the depth of excavation has to be such that the pressure of the load on the surface does not affect the bore, otherwise there is a danger of the surface caving in.

== Trenchless rehabilitation ==
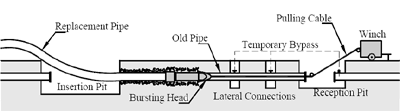
Pipe replacement by pipe bursting

Trenchless rehabilitation includes such construction methods as spiral wound lining, sliplining, thermoformed pipe, pipe bursting, shotcrete, gunite, cured-in-place pipe (CIPP), grout-in-place pipe, mechanical spot repair, and other methods for the repair, rehabilitation, or replacement of existing buried pipes and structures without excavation, or at least with minimal excavation. Mechanical spot repair is applied where damaged pipelines require the reinstatement of structural integrity. Sliplining, CIPP, and thermoformed pipe lining involve pulling or inverting a new liner into an existing pipe, then applying heat and/or pressure to force the liner to expand to fill the pipe. CIPP technologies combine a carrier (felt or fibreglass) impregnated with heat, ultraviolet light, or ambient curable resin to form a "pipe within a pipe". Pipe bursting fractures a pipe from the inside and forces the fragments outwards while a new pipe is drawn in to replace the old. The other methods are primarily for fixing spot leaks. Trenchless rehabilitation methods are generally more cost-effective than traditional exhume (dig) and replace methods.

== Trade associations ==
The trenchless technology industry is represented by several industry associations in addition to standing committees within almost every water and sewer related industry association. The International Society for Trenchless Technology, established in 1986, has 25 active national trenchless technology societies associated with it.

In the UK, the United Kingdom Society for Trenchless Technology (UKSTT) was established in 1993. UKSTT offers a Trenchless Enquiry Service to assist people in all areas of trenchless technology.

In the US, The National Association of Sewer Service Companies (NASSCO) was established in 1976 and is the oldest such association with a trenchless focus. The North American Society for Trenchless Technology (NASTT) was established in 1990.

Several organizations bring out technical journals for sensitizing the readers about such techniques.
