= National Association of Sewer Service Companies =

The National Association of Sewer Service Companies (NASSCO) is a not-for-profit North American trade organization, established in 1976 "to increase the awareness of aging underground infrastructure and to provide viable solutions through education, technical resources and industry advocacy". NASSCO's intent is to research, train and educate members and non-members on rehabilitation of underground utilities using trenchless technology. Ultimately, NASSCO is committed to set the "industry standards for the rehabilitation of underground pipelines, and to assure the continued acceptance and growth of trenchless technologies".

== Publications ==
NASSCO has developed multiple publications covering varied topics. The following is the list of current publications.

- Manual of Practices
- Inspector's Handbook
- Specification Guidelines
- Trenchless Assessment Guide for Rehabilitation
- Pipeline Assessment & Certification Program (PACP) Reference Manual
- Inspector Training Certification Program (ITCP) for Cured-in-Place Pipes (CIPP)
- Inspector Training Certification Program (ITCP) for Manhole Rehabilitation
- Jetter Code of Practices
- RehabZone
