= Pipe bursting =

Trenchless method of replacing buried pipelines

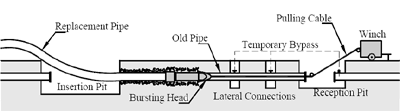
Pipe replacement by pipe bursting

Pipe bursting is a trenchless method of replacing buried pipelines (such as sewer, water, or natural gas pipes) without the need for a traditional construction trench. "Launching and receiving pits" replace the trench needed by conventional pipe-laying.

HDPE pipe is the common replacement pipe.

== Equipment ==
There are five key pieces of equipment used in a pipebursting operation: the expander head, pulling rods, a pulling machine, a retaining device, and a hydraulic power pack.

Today's expander heads have a leading end much smaller in diameter than the trailing (bursting) end, small enough to fit through the pipe that will be replaced. The smaller leading end is designed to guide the expander head through the existing pipe; earlier models did not have this feature and lost course at times, resulting in incomplete pipe bursts and project failures.

The transition from the leading end to the trailing end can include "fins" that make first contact with the existing pipe. Using these fins as the primary breaking point is a very effective way to ensure that the pipe is broken along the entire circumference.

A machine is set in the receiving pit to pull the expander head and new pipe into the line. The head is pulled by heavy, interlocking links that form a chain. Each link weighs several hundred pounds.

All of the equipment used in a pipe bursting operation is powered by one or multiple hydraulic power generators.

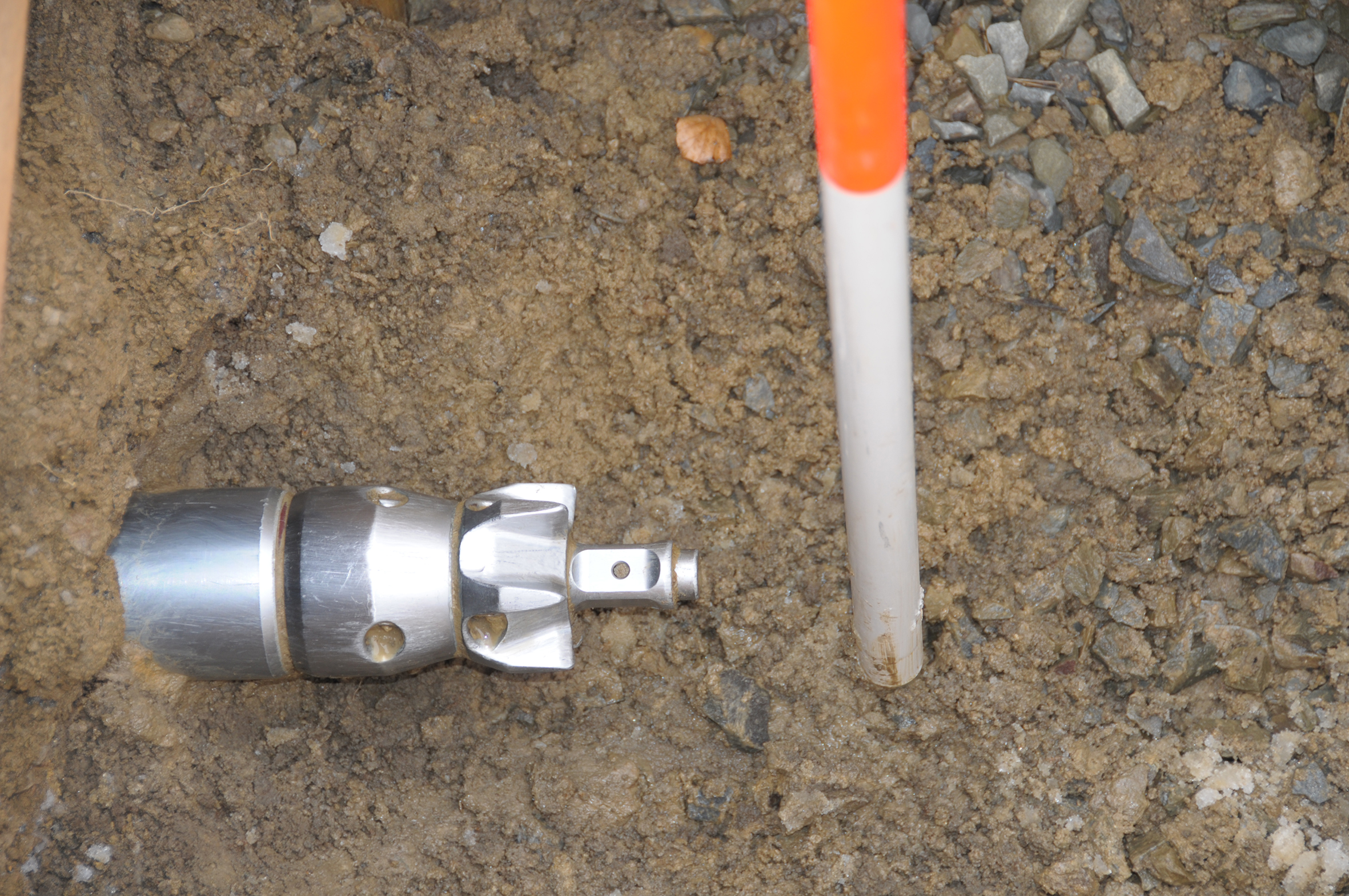
Expander head emerged from the soil at the trailing end

== Other applications ==
Pipe bursting may also be used to expand pipeline carrying capacity by replacing smaller pipes with larger ones, or "upsizing." Extensive proving work by the gas and water industries has demonstrated the feasibility of upsizing gas mains, water mains and sewers. Upsizing from 100mm to 225mm diameter is now well established, and pipes of up to 36 inch diameter and greater have been replaced.
