= Pipe ramming =

Pipe ramming (sometimes also called pipe jacking) is a trenchless method for installation of steel pipes and casings. Distances of 30 m (150 feet) or more and over 500 mm (20 inches) in diameter are common, although the method can be used for much longer and larger installations. The method is useful for pipe and casing installations under railway lines and roads, where other trenchless methods could cause subsidence or heaving. The majority of installations are horizontal, although the method can be used for vertical installations.

The main differences between pipe ramming and pipe jacking are that pipe ramming uses percussion and does not have a navigation system, while pipe jacking uses hydraulic jacks and does have an active navigation system. Pipe ramming is preferable for shorter distances and applications that do not require tight directional control, such as cable installations.

The method uses pneumatic percussive blows to drive the pipe through the ground. The leading edge of the pipe is almost always open, and is typically closed only when smaller pipes are being installed. The shape allows a small overcut (to reduce friction between the pipe and soil and improve load conditions on the pipe), and directs the soil into the pipe interior instead of compacting it outside the pipe. These objectives are usually achieved by attaching a soil-cutting shoe or special bands to the pipe.

Further reduction of friction is typically achieved with lubrication, and different types of bentonite and/or polymers can be used (as in horizontal directional boring) for this purpose. Spoil removal from the pipe can be performed after the entire pipe is in place (shorter installations). If the pipe containing the spoil becomes too heavy before the installation is complete, the ramming can be interrupted and the pipe cleaned (longer installations). Spoil can be removed by auger, compressed air or water jetting.

Research on instrumented pipe ramming installations has allowed the development of pipe ramming-specific models for static soil resistance and dynamic model parameters for simulating drivability of rammed pipes. These procedures can be used to estimate the feasibility of pipe ramming installations.

== Pipe jacking ==
The pipe jacking method consists on the principle of driving the tunnel from a launch shaft in the direction of a target (or reception) shaft.

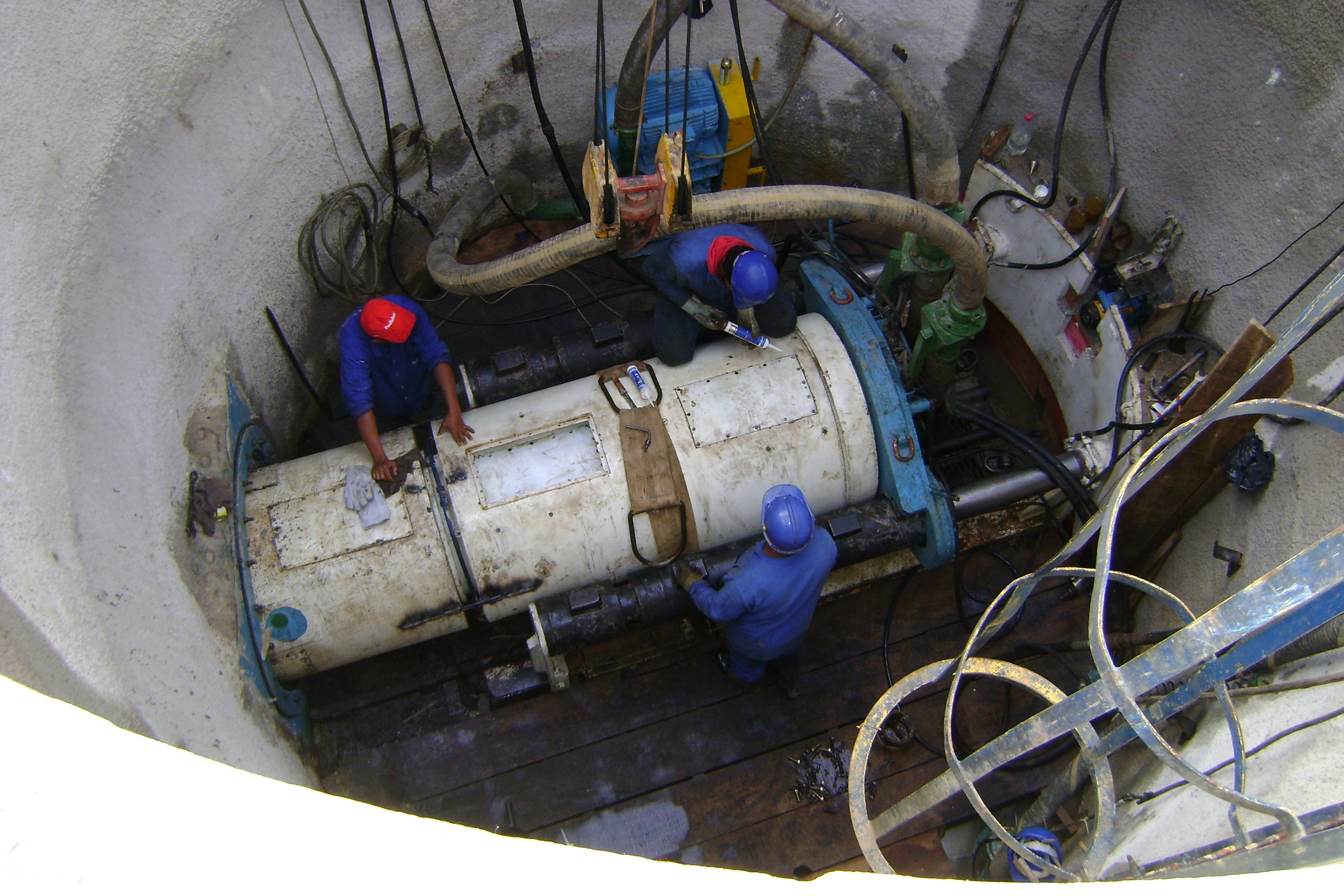
Slurry Pipe Jacking Launch Shaft

The alignment is controlled using a laser beam from the launch shaft, which guides the machine through the tunnel axis. The laser is the basic control device and it works with inclinometers and gyroscopes. The laser beam is directed to the machine cutter head and its position is controlled in real time by a navigation system at the surface.

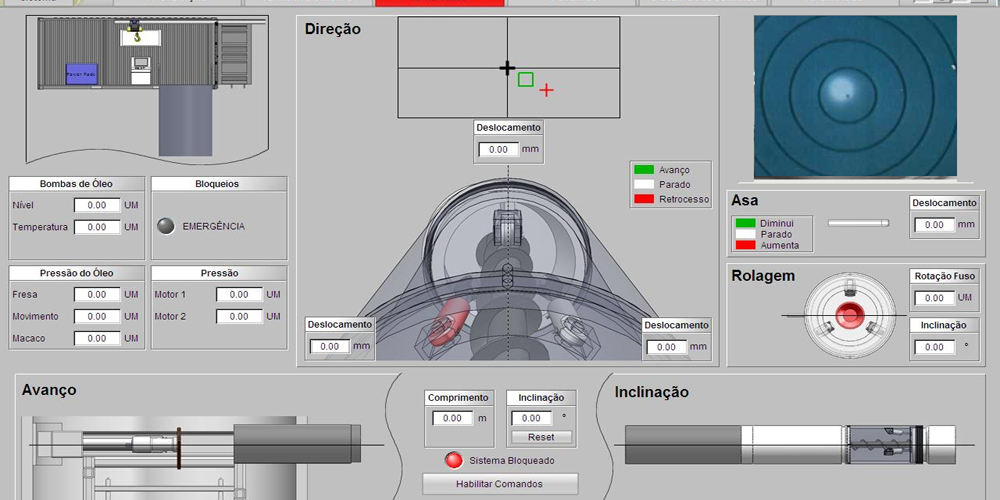
Navigation system for pipe jacking tunneling

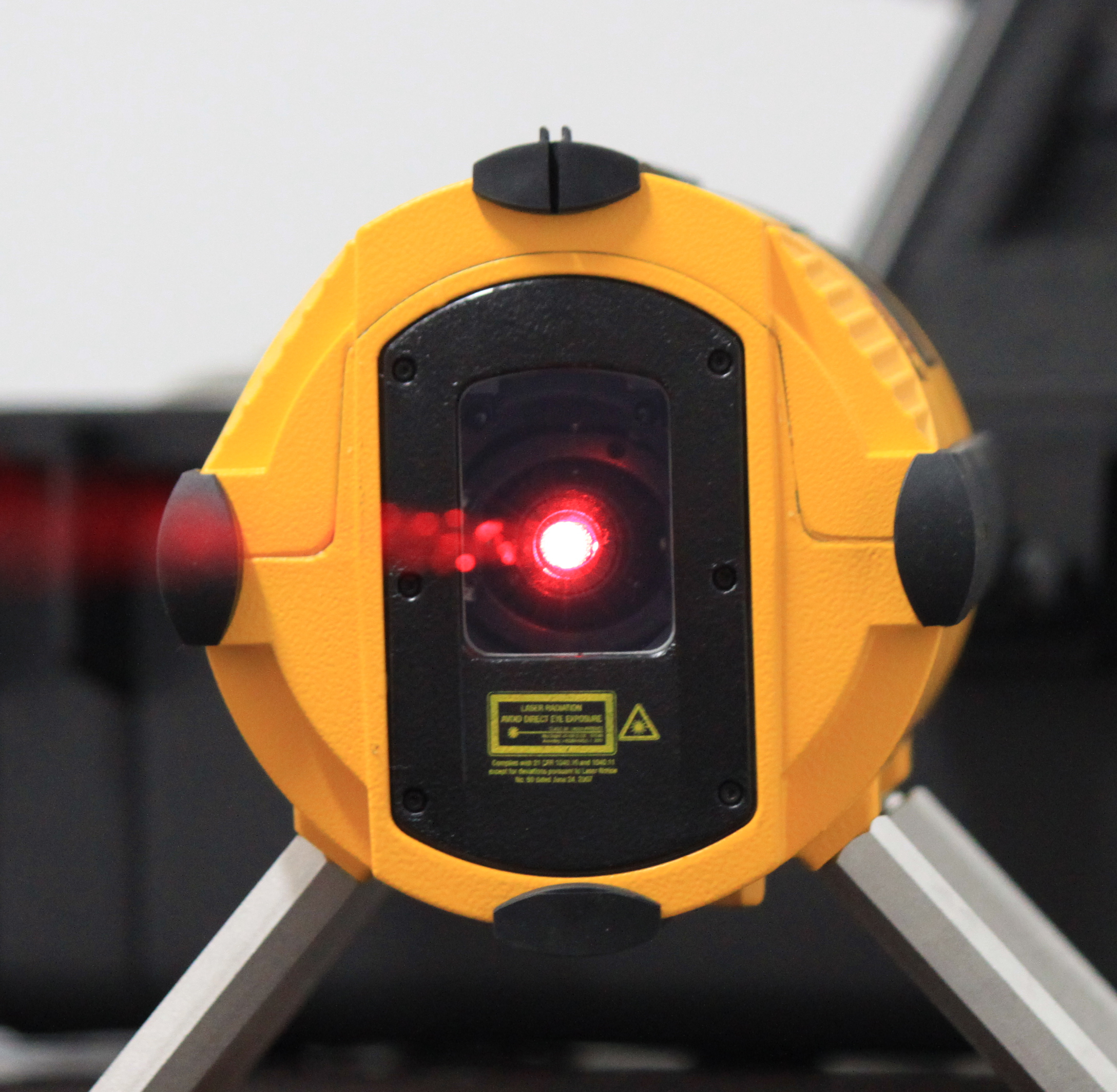
Tunnel Laser Beam used for Pipe Jacking Control
