= Sliplining =

Method for restoring an old pipeline

Sliplining is a technique for repairing leaks or restoring structural integrity to an existing pipeline. It involves installing a smaller, "carrier" (or "liner") pipe into a larger "host" pipe, grouting the annular space between the two pipes, and sealing the ends. Sliplining has been used since the 1940s.

The most common material used to slipline an existing pipe is high-density polyethylene (HDPE), but fiberglass-reinforced plastic (FRP) and polyvinyl chloride (PVC) are also common. The most common sizes are 0.20–1.5 m (8–60 in), but sliplining can be performed in any size pipe given appropriate access and an appropriately sized carrier pipe for installation.

== Installation methods ==
There are two methods used to install a slipline: continuous and segmental.

Continuous sliplining uses a long continuous pipe, such as HDPE, fusible PVC, or welded steel pipe, that are connected into continuous pieces of any length prior to installation. The continuous carrier pipe is pulled through the existing host pipe starting at an insertion pit and continuing to a receiving pit. Either the insertion pit, the receiving pit, or both can be manholes or other existing access points if the size and material of the new carrier pipe can be manoeuvred within the existing facilities.

Segmental sliplining is very similar to continuous sliplining. The difference is primarily based on the pipe material used as the new carrier pipe. When using any bell and spigot pipe such as FRP, PVC, HDPE or spirally welded steel pipe, the individual pieces of pipe are lowered into place, pushed together, and pushed along the existing pipe corridor.

Using either method, the annular space between the two pipes must be grouted to secure the new carrier pipe, transfer loads effectively, and enhance overall stability against external pressures. In the case of sanitary sewer lines, the service laterals must be reconnected via excavation.

== Advantages ==
Sliplining is generally a very cost-effective rehabilitation method. It is also easy to install and requires tools and equipment widely available to any pipeline contractor. Additionally, bypassing the existing flow may not be required when applying segmental sliplining.

== Limitations ==
The new pipe will generally have a significantly reduced cross sectional area because of the size difference between the inside diameter of the host pipe and the outside diameter of the liner pipe. Sewer laterals must be reconnected via excavation. Laterals can be welded to the liner without excavation when the host pipe and installed carrier provide a man-entry opening large enough for workers and equipment to access the liner interior, allowing internal reconnection of service laterals from inside the pipe. Installation usually requires excavation at the insertion and receiving pits. Continuous sliplining generally requires bypassing the existing flow. Storm culverts are often installed without bypass pumping.

If the HDPE pipe has been butt welded, the external bead can be removed from the pipe, which is done with an 'external de-beader' tool. This provides a smooth exterior on the HDPE pipe, allowing it to pass through the existing pipe more easily. Because the weld bead does not contribute any strength to the butt-welded join, removing it is no detriment to the strength or pressure rating of the pipeline. Some pipeline owners may prefer to leave the bead in place as it often does not affect the installation. The bead may be ground down or stripped off as a HDPE carrier pipe is pulled through its host pipe.
