= Water distribution system =

Infrastructure to carry potable water to consumers

An example of a water distribution system: a pumping station, a water tower, water mains, fire hydrants, and service lines

A water distribution system is a part of water supply network with components that carry potable water from a centralized treatment plant or wells to consumers to satisfy residential, commercial, industrial and fire fighting requirements.

== Definitions ==
Water distribution network is the term for the portion of a water distribution system up to the service points of bulk water consumers or demand nodes where many consumers are lumped together. The World Health Organization (WHO) uses the term water transmission system for a network of pipes, generally in a tree-like structure, that is used to convey water from water treatment plants to service reservoirs, and uses the term water distribution system for a network of pipes that generally has a loop structure to supply water from the service reservoirs and balancing reservoirs to consumers.

== Components ==
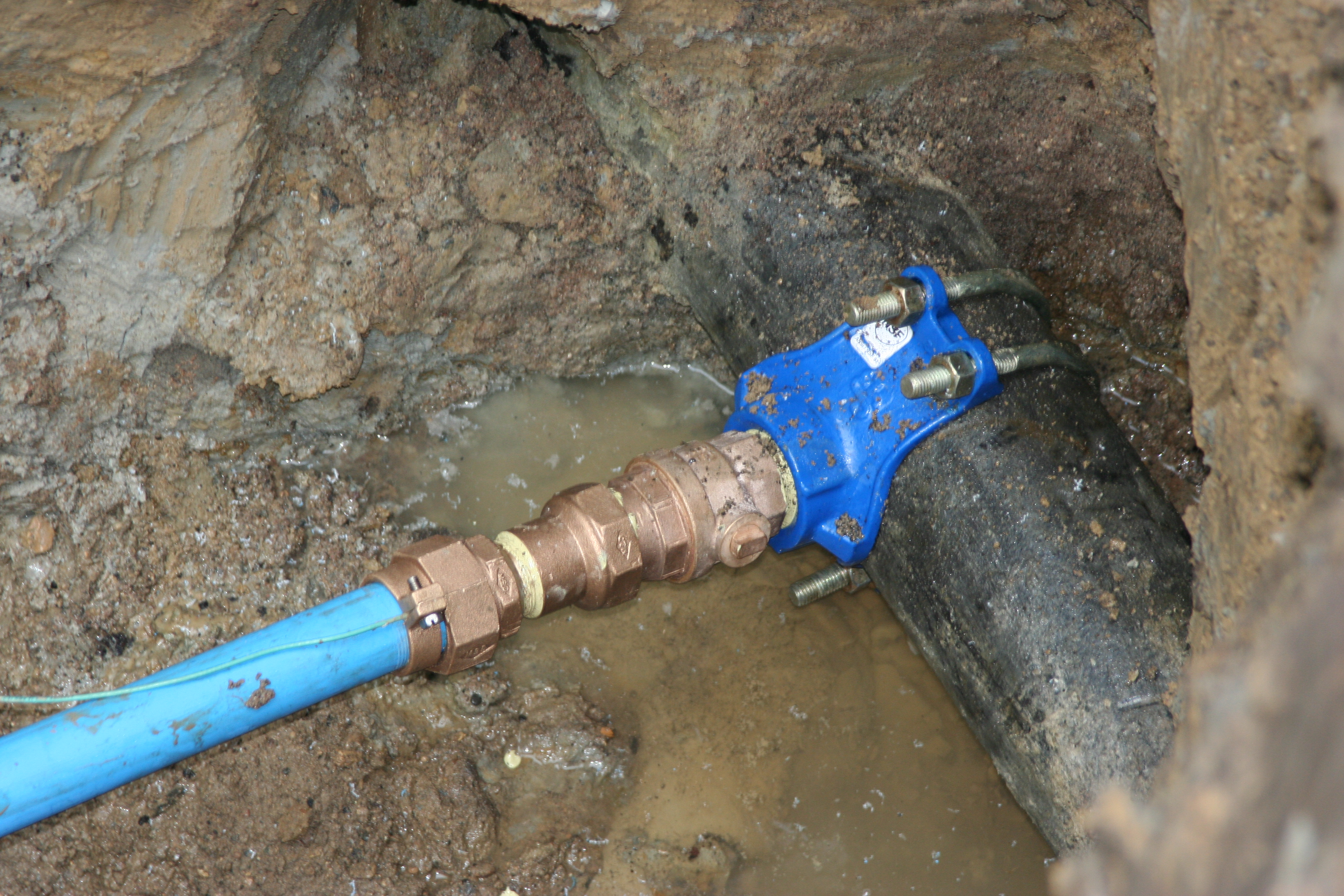
Water main tap

A water distribution system consists of pipelines, storage facilities, pumps, and other accessories.

Pipelines laid within public right of way called water mains are used to transport water within a distribution system. Large diameter water mains called primary feeders are used to connect between water treatment plants and service areas. Secondary feeders are connected between primary feeders and distributors. Distributors are water mains that are located near the water users, which also supply water to individual fire hydrants. A service line is a small diameter pipe used to connect from a water main through a small tap to a water meter at user's location. There is a service valve (also known as curb stop) on the service line located near street curb to shut off water to the user's location.

Storage facilities, or distribution reservoirs, provide clean drinking water storage (after required water treatment process) to ensure the system has enough water to service in response to fluctuating demands (service reservoirs), or to equalize the operating pressure (balancing reservoirs). They can also be temporarily used to serve fire fighting demands during a power outage. The following are types of distribution reservoirs:

- Underground storage reservoir or covered finished water reservoir: An underground storage facility or large ground-excavated reservoir that is fully covered. The walls and the bottom of these reservoirs may be lined with impermeable materials to prevent ground water intrusion.
- uncovered finished water reservoir: A large ground-excavated reservoir that has adequate measures or lining to prevent surface water runoff and ground water intrusion but does not have a top cover. This type of reservoir is less desirable as the water will not be further treated before distribution and is susceptible to contaminants such as bird waste, animal and human activities, algal bloom, and airborne deposition.
- Surface reservoir (also known as ground storage tank and ground storage reservoir): A storage facility built on the ground with the wall lined with concrete, shotcrete, asphalt, or membrane. A surface reservoir is usually covered to prevent contamination. They are typically located in high elevation areas that have enough hydraulic head for distribution. When a surface reservoir at ground level cannot provide a sufficient hydraulic head to the distribution system, booster pumps will be required.
- Water tower (also known as elevated surface reservoir): An elevated water tank. A few common types are spheroid elevated storage tank, a steel spheroid tank on top of a small-diameter steel column; composite elevated storage tank, a steel tank on a large-diameter concrete column; and hydropillar elevated storage tanks, a steel tank on a large-diameter steel column. The space within the large column below the water tank can be used for other purposes such as multi-story office space and storage space. A main concern for using water towers in the water distribution system is the aesthetic of the area.
- Standpipe: A water tank that is a combination of ground storage tank and water tower. It is slightly different from an elevated water tower in that the standpipe allows water storage from the ground level to the top of the tank. The bottom storage area is called supporting storage, and the upper part which would be at the similar height of an elevated water tower is called useful storage.
- Sump: This is a contingency water storage facility that is not used to distribute water directly. It is typically built underground in a circular shape with a dome top above ground. The water from a sump will be pumped to a service reservoir when it is needed.

Storage facilities are typically located at the center of the service locations. Being at the central location reduces the length of the water mains to the services locations. This reduces the friction loss when water is transported over a water main.

Storage facilities

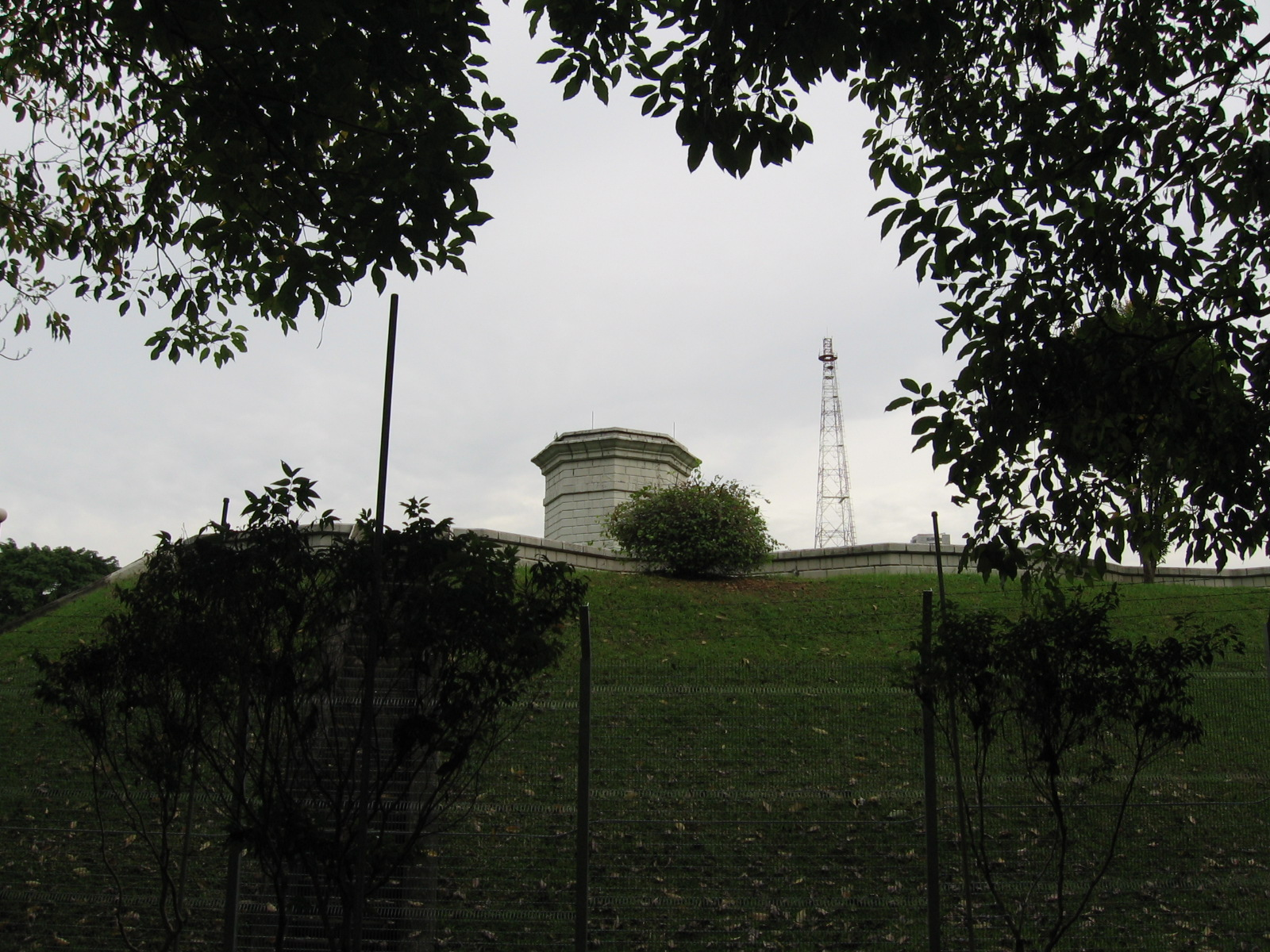
Underground storage reservoir

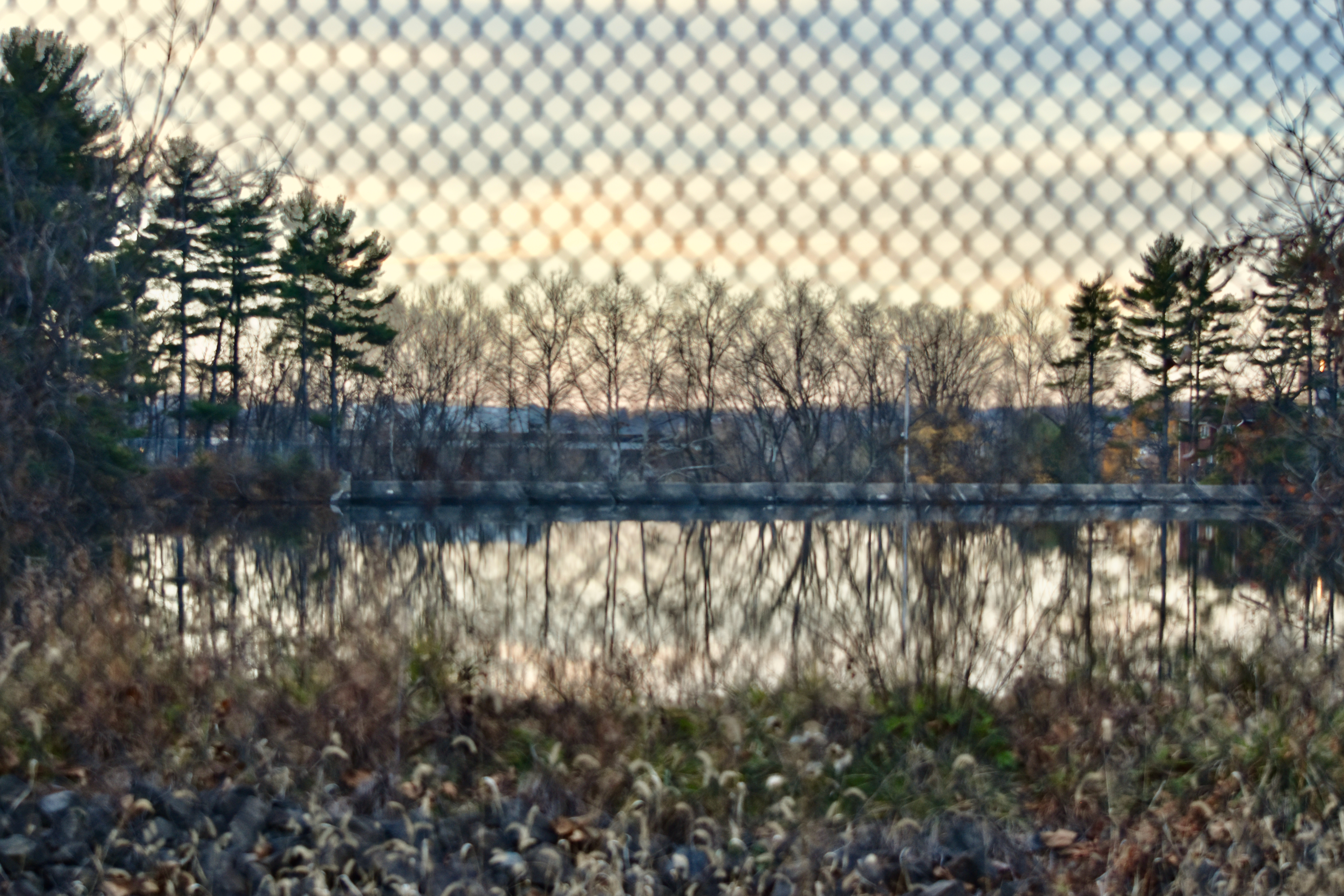
Uncovered finished water reservoir

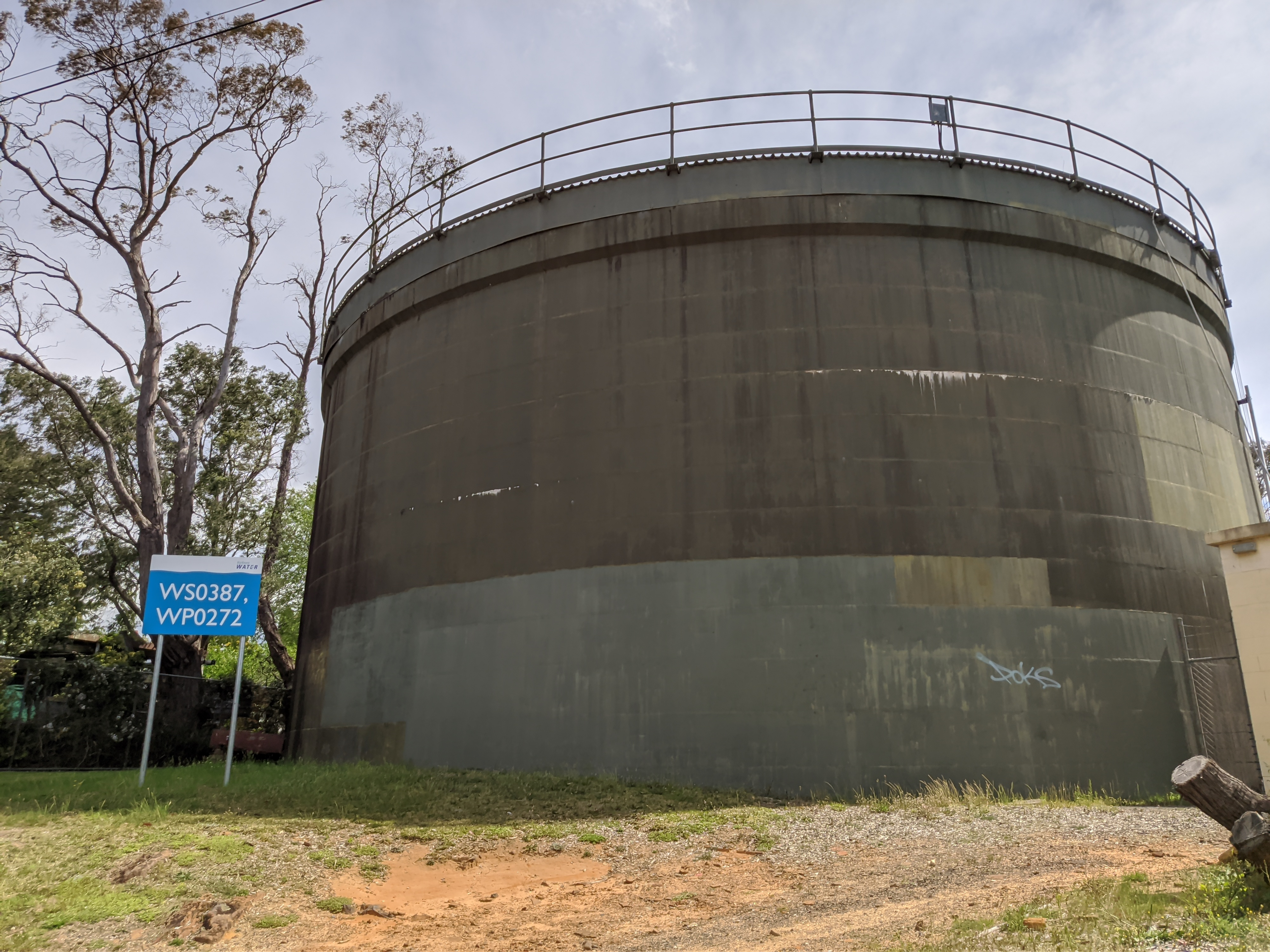
Ground storage tank

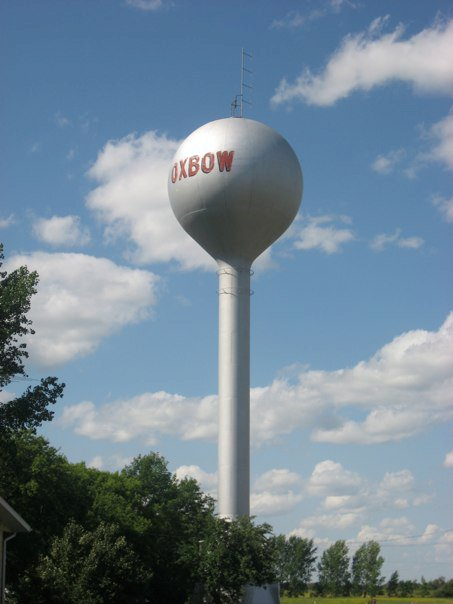
Spheroid elevated storage tank

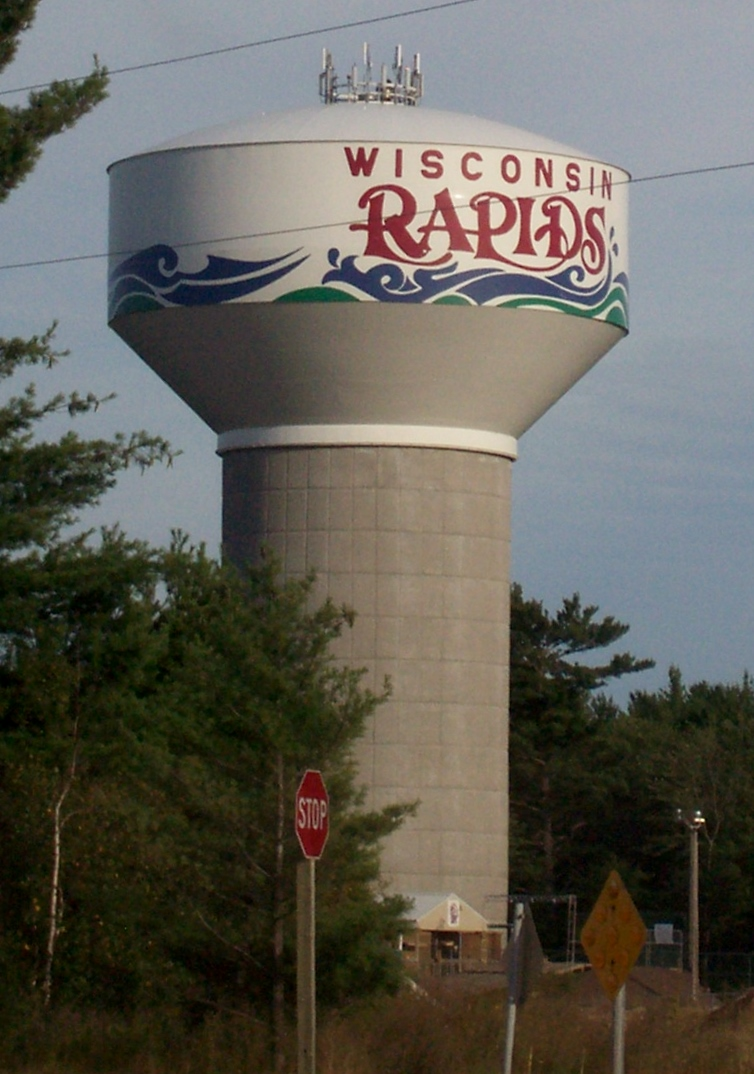
Composite elevated storage tank

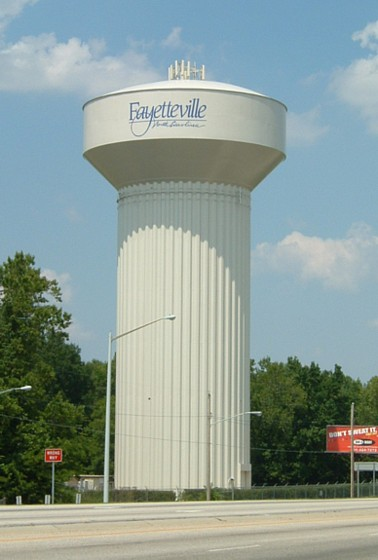
Hydropillar elevated storage tank

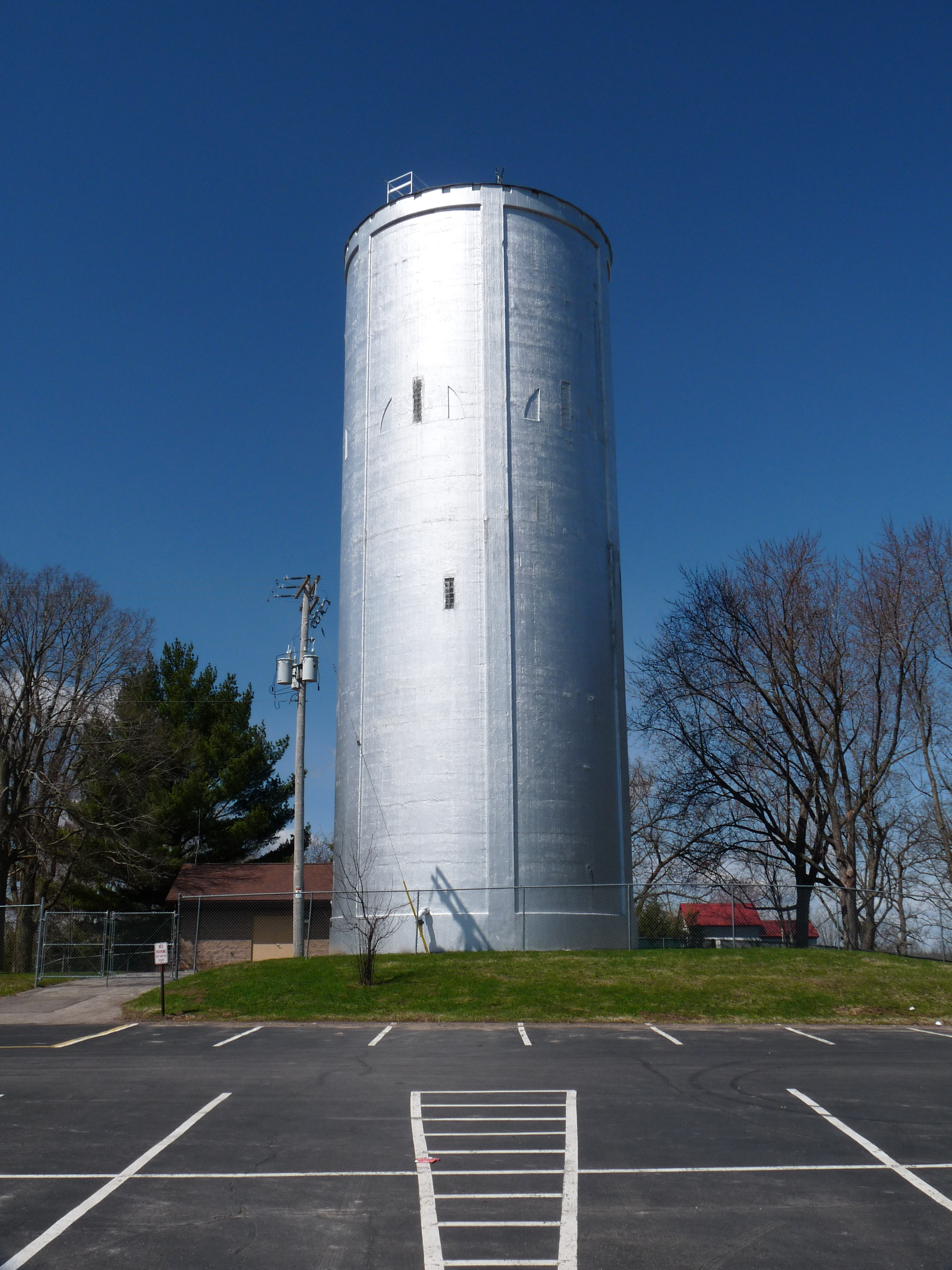
Standpipe

== Topologies ==
In general, a water distribution system can be classified as having a grid, ring, radial or dead end layout.

A grid system follows the general layout of the road grid with water mains and branches connected in rectangles. With this topology, water can be supplied from several directions, allowing water circulation and redundancy if a section of the network has broken down. Drawbacks of this topology include difficulty sizing the system.

A ring system has a water main for each road, and there is a sub-main branched off the main to provide circulation to customers. This topology has some of the advantages of a grid system, but it is easier to determine sizing.

A radial system delivers water into multiple zones. At the center of each zone, water is delivered radially to the customers.

A dead end system has water mains along roads without a rectangular pattern. It is used for communities whose road networks are not regular. As there are no cross-connections between the mains, water can have less circulation and therefore stagnation may be a problem.

== System Integrity ==
The integrity of the systems are broken down into physical, hydraulic, and water quality.

Physical integrity includes concerns regarding the ability of the barriers to prevent contamination from external sources into the water distribution system. The deterioration can be caused by physical or chemical factors.

Hydraulic integrity is an ability to maintain adequate water pressure inside the pipes throughout the distribution system. It also includes the circulation and length of time that the water travels within a distribution system, which impacts the effectiveness of disinfectants.

Water quality integrity is the control of degradation as the water travels through a distribution system. The impact of water quality can be caused by physical or hydraulic factors. Water quality degradation can also take place within the distribution system, such as microorganism growth, nitrification, and internal corrosion of the pipes.

=== Network analysis and optimization ===
Analyses are performed to assist in design, operation, maintenance and optimization of water distribution systems. There are two main types of analyses: hydraulic and water quality behavior as it flows through a water distribution system. Optimizing the design of water distribution networks is a complex task. However, a large number of methods have already been proposed, mainly based on metaheuristics. Employing mathematical optimization techniques can lead to substantial construction savings in these kinds of infrastructures.

== Hazards ==
Hazards in water distribution systems can be in the forms of microbial, chemical and physical.

Most microorganisms are harmless within water distribution systems. However, when infectious microorganisms enter the systems, they form biofilms and create microbial hazards to the users. Biofilms are usually formed near the end of the distribution where the water circulation is low. This supports their growth and makes disinfection agents less effective. Common microbial hazards in distribution systems come from contamination of human faecal pathogens and parasites which enter the systems through cross-connections, breaks, water main works, and open storage tanks.

Chemical hazards are those of disinfection by-products, leaching of piping materials and fittings, and water treatment chemicals.

Physical hazards include turbidity of water, odors, colors, scales which are buildups of materials inside the pipes from corrosions, and sediment resuspension.

There are several bodies around the world that create standards to limit hazards in the distribution systems: NSF International in North America; European Committee for Standardization, British Standards Institution and Umweltbundesamt in Europe; Japanese Standards Association in Asia; Standards Australia in Australia; and Brazilian National Standards Organization in Brazil.

=== Lead service lines ===
Lead contamination in drinking water can be from leaching of lead that was used in old water mains, service lines, pipe joints, plumbing fittings and fixtures. According to WHO, the most significant contributor of lead in water in many countries is the lead service line.

== Maintenance ==
=== Internal corrosion control ===
Water quality can deteriorate due to corrosion of metal pipe surfaces and connections in distribution systems. Pipe corrosion shows in water as color, taste and odor, any of which may cause health concerns.

Health issues relate to releases of trace metals such as lead, copper or cadmium into the water. Lead exposure can cause delays in physical and mental development in children. Long term exposure to copper may cause liver and kidney damage. High or long term exposure of cadmium may cause damage to various organs. Corrosion of iron pipes causes rusty or red water. Corrosion of zinc and iron pipes can cause metallic taste.

Various techniques can be used to control internal corrosion, for example, pH level adjustment, adjustment of carbonate and calcium to create calcium carbonate as a pipe surface coating, and applying a corrosion inhibitor. For example, phosphate products that form films over pipe surfaces is a type of corrosion inhibitor. This reduces the chance of leaching of trace metals from the pipe materials into the water.

=== Hydrant flushing ===
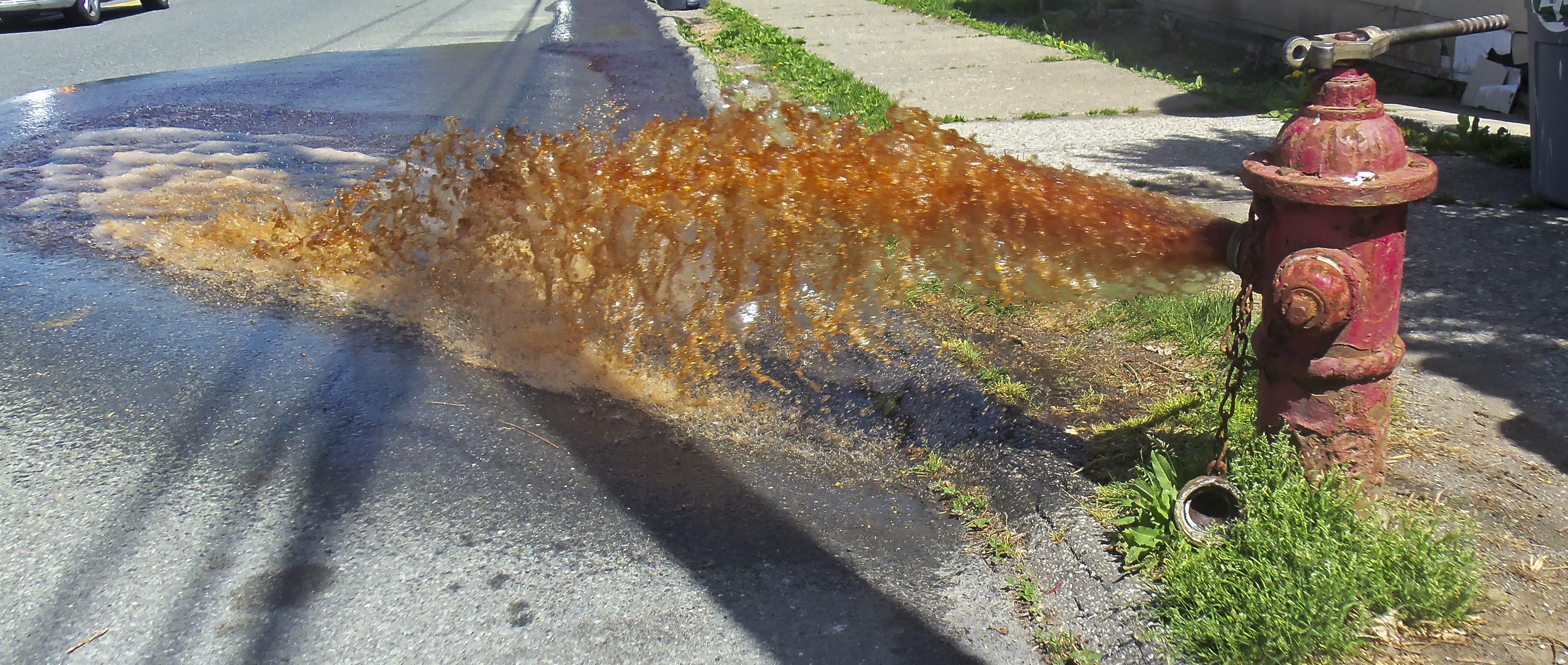
Fire hydrant flushing rusty water

Hydrant flushing is the scheduled release of water from fire hydrants or special flushing hydrants to purge iron and other mineral deposits from a water main. Another benefit of using fire hydrants for water main flushing is to test whether water is supplied to fire hydrants at adequate pressure for fire fighting. During hydrant flushing, consumers may notice rust color in their water as iron and mineral deposits are stirred up in the process.

=== Water main renewals ===
After water mains are in service for a long time, there will be deterioration in structural, water quality, and hydraulic performance. Structural deterioration may be caused by many factors. Metal-based pipes develop internal and external corrosion, causing the pipe walls to thin or degrade. They can eventually leak or burst. Cement-based pipes are subject to cement matrix and reinforced steel deterioration. All pipes are subject to joint failures. Water quality deterioration includes scaling, sedimentation, and biofilm formation. Scaling is the formation of hard deposits on the interior wall of pipes. This can be a by-product of pipe corrosion combined with calcium in the water, which is called tuberculation. Sedimentation is when solids settle within the pipes, usually at recesses between scaling build-ups. When there is a change in the velocity of water flow (such as sudden use of a fire hydrant), the settled solids will be stirred up, causing water to be discolored. Biofilms can develop in highly scaled and thus rough-surfaced pipes where bacteria are allowed to grow, as the higher the roughness of the interior wall, the harder it is for disinfectant to kill the bacteria on the surface of the pipe wall. Hydraulic deterioration that affects pressures and flows can be a result of other deterioration that obstructs the water flow.

When it is time for water main renewal, there are many considerations in choosing the method of renewal. This can be open-trench replacement or one of the pipeline rehabilitation methods. A few pipeline rehabilitation methods are pipe bursting, sliplining, and pipe lining.

Water main renewal methods

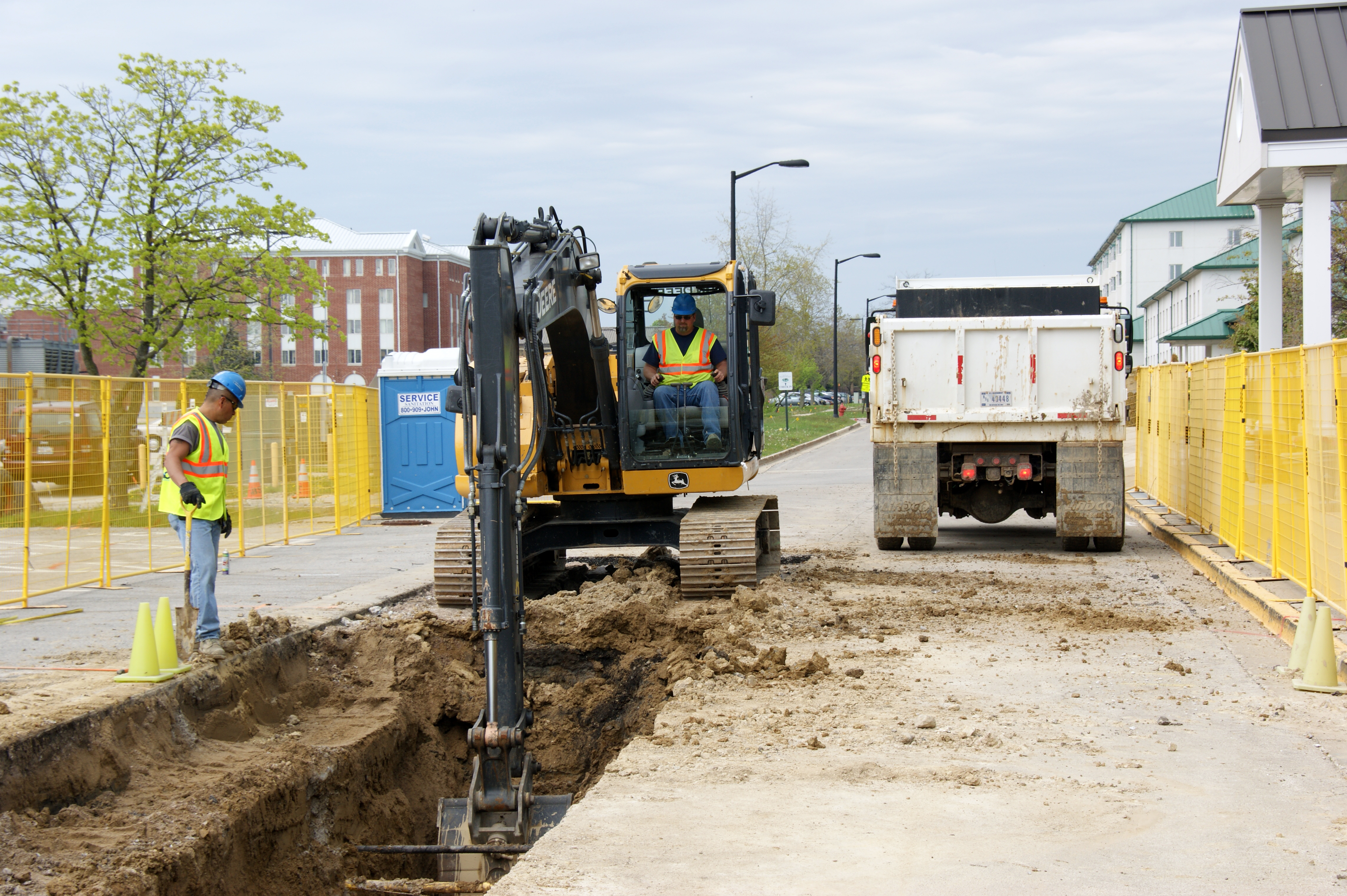
Open-trench water main replacement

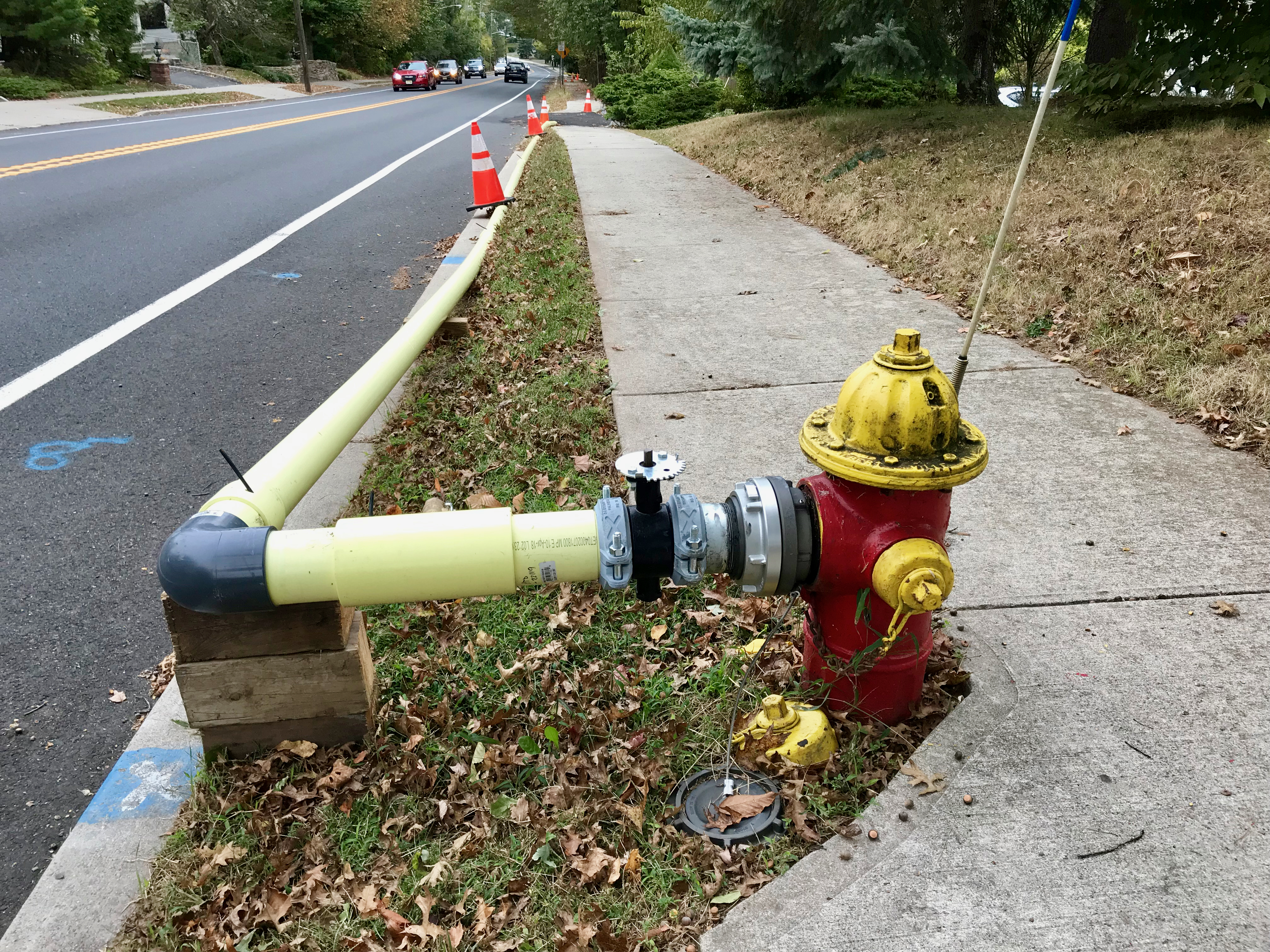
Feed hydrant supplies water to a temporary bypass piping

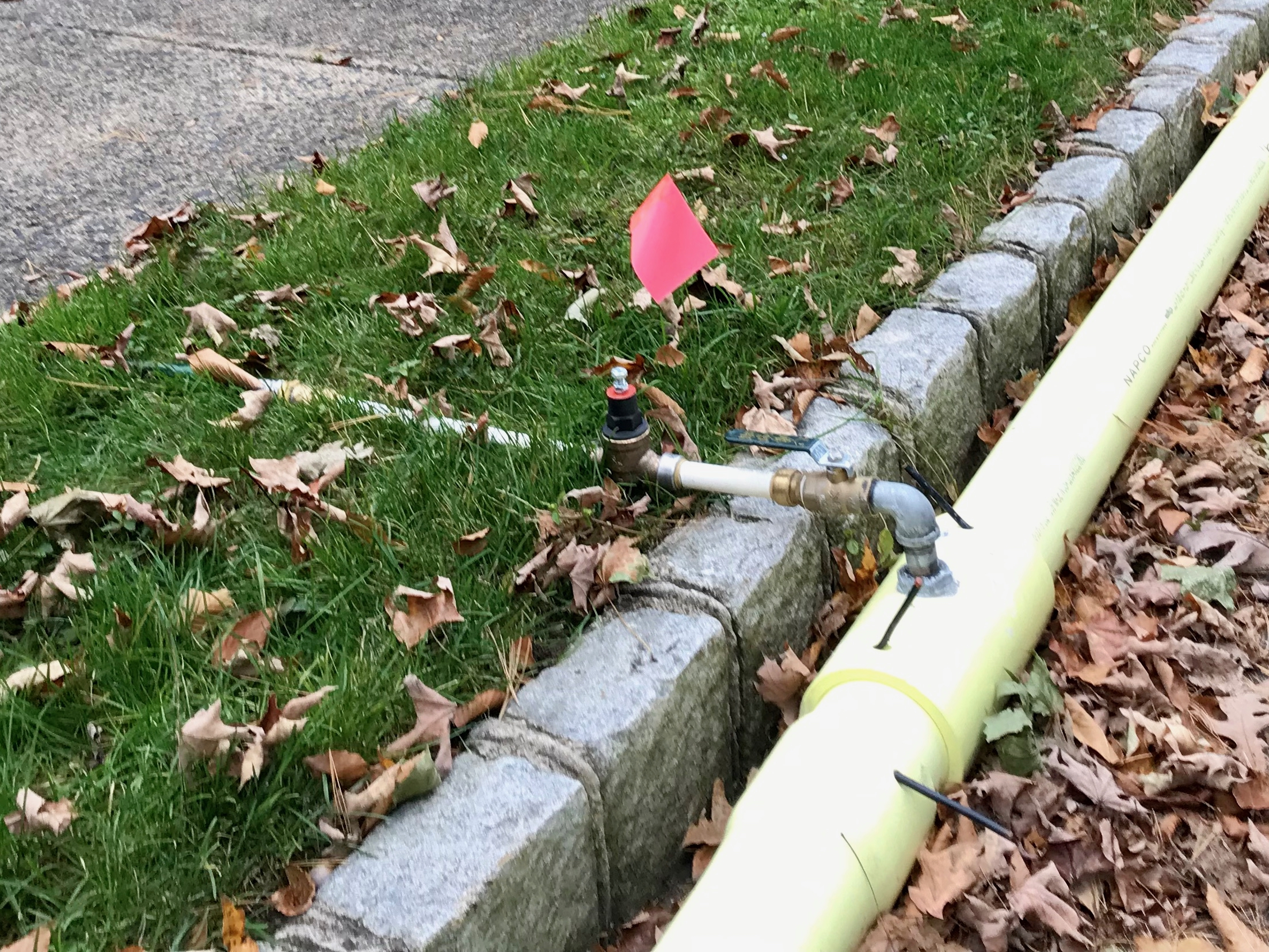
Service connection of a temporary bypass piping

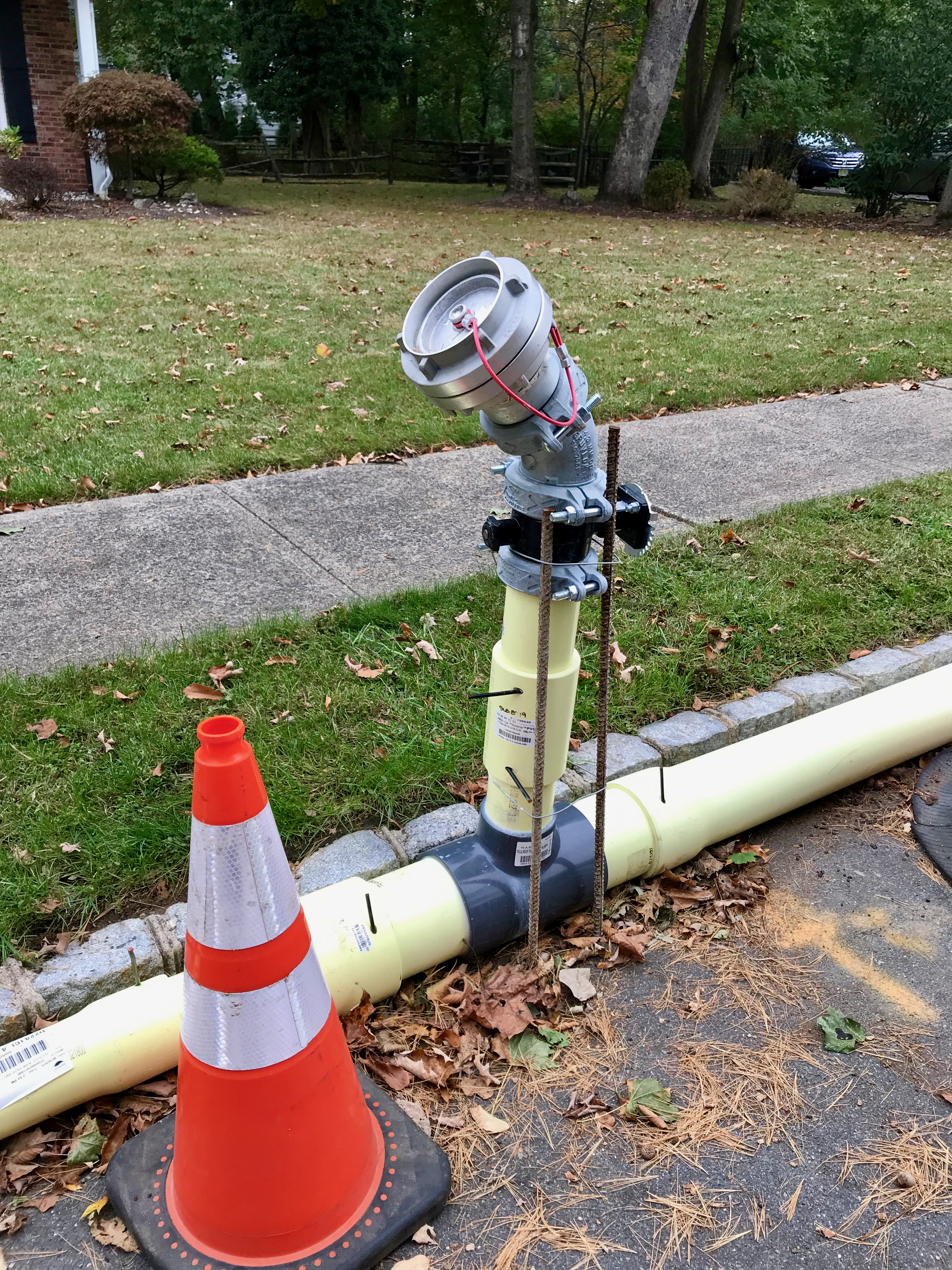
Temporary fire hydrant

When an in-situ rehabilitation method is used, one benefit is the lower cost, as there is no need to excavate along the entire water main pipeline. Only small pits are excavated to access the existing water main. The unavailability of the water main during the rehabilitation, however, requires building a temporary water bypass system to serve as the water main in the affected area. A temporary water bypass system (known as temporary bypass piping) should be carefully designed to ensure an adequate water supply to the customers in the project area. Water is taken from a feed hydrant into a temporary pipe. When the pipe crosses a driveway or a road, a cover or a cold patch should be put in place to allow cars to cross the temporary pipe. Temporary service connections to homes can be made to the temporary pipe. Among many ways to make a temporary connection, a common one is to connect the temporary service connection to a garden hose. The temporary pipe should also add temporary fire hydrants for fire protection.

As water main work can disturb lead service lines, which can result in elevated lead levels in drinking water, it is recommended that when a water utility plans a water main renewal project, it should work with property owners to replace lead service lines as part of the project.

== See also ==
- Water supply network
- District heating for hot water distribution system
