= Akkerman (disambiguation) =

Akkerman may refer to:

== Places ==
- Bilhorod-Dnistrovskyi, a city in Ukraine
- Akkerman Oblast, a region in Ukraine
- Akerman Fortress; see Tyras

== Other uses ==
- Akkerman (surname)
- Akkerman Inc., a construction equipment manufacturer in Brownsdale, Minnesota, U.S.

== See also ==
- Akkerman Convention
- Ackerman (disambiguation)
- Ackermann (disambiguation)
- Akerman
- Åkerman
- Ackermans (disambiguation)
