= Ackerman =

Ackerman may refer to:

== Surname ==
- Ackerman (surname), people with the surname Ackerman

== Places ==
- Ackerman, Mississippi, town in Choctaw County, Mississippi, US
- Ackerman, West Virginia, former unincorporated community in Mineral County, West Virginia, US
- Ackerman Island, sandbar in the Arkansas River near Wichita, Kansas, US
- Ackerman Nunatak, ridge of the Pensacola Mountains, Antarctica
- Ackerman Ridge, ridge of the Queen Maud Mountains, Antarctica
- Akkerman

== Other uses ==
- Ackerman House (disambiguation)
- Ackerman syndrome, medical disease
- Ackermann steering geometry

== See also ==
- Ackerman McQueen
- Ackermans (disambiguation)
- Ackermann (disambiguation)
- Akkerman (disambiguation)
- Åkerman, a Swedish surname
