= Akerman =

For the Roman Road in Southern England see Akeman Street.

Akerman is a surname. Notable people with the surname include:

- Alexander Akerman (1869–1948), American lawyer and judge
- Amos T. Akerman (1821–1880), US Attorney General
- Chantal Akerman (1950–2015), Belgian film director, artist and professor
- Clive Akerman (died 2013), English philatelist
- Damián Akerman (born 1980), Argentine footballer
- Jeremy Akerman (born 1942), Canadian politician, writer and actor
- John Yonge Akerman (1806–1873), English antiquarian
- Lucy Evelina Metcalf Akerman (1816–1874), American Unitarian writer
- Mariano Akerman (born 1963), Argentine painter, architect and art historian
- Piers Akerman (born 1950), Australian journalist and editor
- Rachel Akerman (1522–1544), Austrian poet

== See also ==
- Lincoln Akerman School, an elementary school and middle school in Hampton Falls, New Hampshire, United States
