= 2007 Australia Day Honours =

The 2007 Australia Day Honours are appointments to various orders and honours to recognise and reward good works by Australian citizens. The list was announced on 26 January 2007 by the Governor General of Australia, Michael Jeffrey

The Australia Day Honours are the first of the two major annual honours lists, the first announced to coincide with Australia Day (26 January), with the other being the Queen's Birthday Honours, which are announced on the second Monday in June.

== Order of Australia ==
=== Companion (AC) ===
==== General Division ====
| Recipient | Citation | Notes |
|---|---|---|
| Dr Kenneth Ross Henry | For service to the development and implementation of economic and taxation policy, to the finance sector through a range of banking and regulatory bodies, and to the community in the area of welfare and care of native wildlife. | |
| Janet Lee Holmes a Court AO | For service to business, particularly as a leader in the construction, wine and cattle industries, to the advancement of Western Australia's musical and theatre culture, to the visual arts, and to the community. | |
| Dr Barry James Marshall | For service to medicine and to medical research, particularly through the discovery of the bacterium Helicobacter Pylori and its role in gastritis and peptic ulcer disease. | |
| Dr Bridget Margaret Ogilvie | For service to science in the field of biomedical research, particularly related to veterinary and medical parasitology, and through support for research funding to improve global health. | |
| Dr Peter Roger Shergold AM | For service to the community as a significant leader of changes and innovation in the public sector, particularly through the development and implementation of a whole-of-government approach to policy development and program delivery. | |
| Dr John "Robin" Warren | For service to medicine and to medical research, particularly through the discovery of the bacterium Helicobacter Pylori and its role in gastritis and peptic ulcer disease. | |

=== Officer (AO) ===
==== General Division ====
| Recipient | Citation | Notes |
|---|---|---|
| The Honourable Michael John Ahern | For service to the Queensland Parliament, to economic and trade development through fostering primary production and international relationships, and to the community through technological, medical research, educational and charitable organisations. | |
| Dr Susan Marie Alberti AM | For service to the community through support for major medical research institutions, particularly as a philanthropist, fundraiser and advocate for juvenile diabetes care and research. | |
| Dr Neil Armfield | For service to the arts, nationally and internationally, as a director of theatre, opera and film, and as a promoter of innovative Australian productions including Australian Indigenous drama. | |
| Russell Stephen Balding | For service to the Australian broadcasting industry, particularly through initiatives in the areas of service delivery, advanced technology and financial management, and to the accounting profession through CPA Australia. | |
| The Honourable Dr John Charles Bannon | For service to politics and to the South Australian Parliament, to history, particularly through researching and publishing in the subject area of Australian Federation; and to the community through sporting, cultural and welfare organisations. | |
| Dr Peter John Boxall | For service to economic and financial policy development and reform in the areas of accrual budgeting, taxation, and workplace relations. | |
| The Reverend Monsignor David John Cappo | For service to the community of South Australia, particularly as Chair of the Social Inclusion Board and through involvement with social justice and health organisations, and to the Catholic Church in Australia. | |
| Benjamin Ming Tung Chow | For service to the community through inter-cultural activities to promote economic and employment opportunities and social interaction, including the establishment of Harmony Day. | |
| The Reverend Margaret Court MBE | For service to tennis as a player, as a mentor to junior female elite competitors and through professional development programs; and to the communities of Australia and Sri Lanka as the initiator of a range of pastoral care, social support and emergency accommodation projects. | |
| Maurice John de Rohan OBE | For service to Australia Britain relations through involvement with and contributions to organisations promoting business, educational, charitable, community and sporting initiatives. (Posthumous) | |
| Professor Margaret Elaine Gardner | For service to tertiary education, particularly in the areas of university governance and gender equity, and to industrial relations in Queensland. | |
| Professor John Medwyn Hutson | For service to medicine, particularly in the field of paediatric surgery as a clinician, teacher and researcher, and to the community through the Scouting movement. | |
| The Honourable Justice David Andrew Ipp | For service to the judiciary through implementation of major reforms in court procedure in Western Australia, and to the law as a significant contributor to a review of the law of negligence in Australia. | |
| The Honourable Robert Ian Knowles | For service to the community as a contributor to a range of aged care, mental health, medical research and cultural organisations through the development of policies and protocols relating to food standards; and to the Victorian Parliament. | |
| Michard Gerard L'estrange | For service to the development and implementation of public policy in Australia, particularly national security and foreign policy, and to international relations through fostering diplomatic, trade and cultural interests, including strengthening Australia's relationship with the United Kingdom. | |
| Gillian Margaret Moore | For service to education, particularly as Principal of Pymble Ladies' College, by fostering academic excellence and student participation across a range of sporting and arts activities, and as a major contributor to the independent schools' sector. | |
| David Victor Murray | For service to the finance sector nationally and internationally through strategic leadership and policy development, to education, particularly fostering relations between educational institutions and business and industry, and to the community as a supporter of and fundraiser for cultural and church organisations. | |
| Linda Bardo Nicholls | For service to Australian business, particularly in the areas of governance and corporate social responsibility, and as a mentor to women in the sector; to education; and to the community through major contributions to health and cultural organisations. | |
| The Reverend Father Peter Julian Norden | For service to community development through social research and programs aimed at assisting marginalised young people and offenders, to the mental health sector, and to the Catholic Church in Australia. | |
| Professor Borje Christopher Nordin | For service to medicine nationally and internationally as a pioneering researcher in the fields of calcium metabolism, osteoporosis and renal stone disease, and as a clinician and academic. | |
| The Honourable John Wayne Olsen | For service to the South Australian Parliament, particularly in the areas of economic development and reform, and through promoting business, infrastructure and investment opportunities; to international relations; and to the community. | |
| Roslyn Redman Packer | For service to the community as a major supporter of and fundraiser for a broad range of arts, cultural, medical research and health care organisations. | |
| The Honourable Justice John William Perry | For service to the judiciary and to the law, particularly as a contributor to the activities of professional regulatory committees, to legal education, and to the community. | |
| Robert Baddeley "Bob" Simpson AM | For service to cricket as a coach at state, national and international levels, as a consultant, particularly in countries where cricket is an emerging sport, and through contributions to revision of the laws of cricket. | |
| The Honourable Anthony Allan Staley | For service to politics as a parliamentarian and contributor to the development of the Liberal Party of Australia, to the telecommunications industry, and to the arts. | |
| Professor Lance Thomas Twomey AM | For service to higher education as an administrator and academic, through promoting Australian tertiary education to the international market, and as a supporter of Indigenous, regional and multicultural education programs. | |
| The Honourable Justice Frank Hollis Vincent | For service to the judiciary and the law as a contributor to the reform of penal and parole systems, the rehabilitation of offenders, and Indigenous Australians involved with the criminal justice system; and to education as Chancellor of Victoria University, including efforts to increase educational opportunities for disadvantaged youth. | |

==== Military Division ====
| Branch | Recipient | Citation | Notes |
|---|---|---|---|
| Army | Brigadier Paul Bruce Symon AM | For distinguished service as the Commander Joint Task Force 633 on Operations CATALYST and SLIPPER. | |

=== Member (AM) ===
==== General Division ====
| Recipient | Citation | Notes |
|---|---|---|
| The Honourable Alan Richard Abadee RFD, QC | For service to the judiciary and to the law, particularly through contributions to the development and reform of sentencing practice, and to the military justice system. | |
| Anne "Doreen" Akkerman | For service to the community through the establishment and development of information and support services in the areas of cancer and palliative care, and to the further education of health professionals, particularly breast care nurses. | |
| Dr Belle Yarbrough Alderman | For service to Australian children's literature as an academic, researcher and mentor to emerging writers and illustrators, to the development and management of the Lu Rees Archives of Australian Children's Literature and to professional associations. | |
| John Kitchener Allen | For service to the events management industry and to the development and establishment of education and training programs. | |
| Dr Ian Robert Anderson | For service to the community through international humanitarian aid organisations and refugee programs and services, and to the finance sector. | |
| Associate Professor Constantine Nicholas Aroney | For service to medicine in the field of cardiology, to the National Heart Foundation of Australia and to the Cardiac Society of Australia and New Zealand. | |
| Simon Roger Balderstone | For service to environmental protection and Indigenous affairs, to the Olympic movement, and to the community through organisations providing health, education, cultural and development assistance services. | |
| Nancy "Joy" Baluch | For service to local government in South Australia, particularly through contributions to economic and regional development, and to the community of Port Augusta and region. | |
| Ronald Edwin "Ron" Barr OAM | For service to children and young people through Youth Insearch programs that support and assist them in learning and developing life and attitudinal skills. | |
| Bernard "Paul" Bartels | For service to the community, particularly through Southern Cross Care and the provision of aged care facilities, and in the development and implementation of public housing policy in New South Wales. | |
| Colin Charles Beauchamp | For service to the community, particularly through a range of executive and fundraising roles with the Lions Cancer Institute in Western Australia. | |
| Guido Franco Belgiorno-Nettis | For service to the construction industry, particularly through the management of major infrastructure projects, and to the arts through executive and philanthropic roles. | |
| Nick Bianco | For service to the building and construction industry in South Australia, and to the community through philanthropic support for sporting and charitable organisations. | |
| James Birch | For service to the community through leadership and management roles in the health and justice systems, and in the areas of public housing and child protection services. | |
| Christopher Richard Bonnor | For service to education through significant contributions to the development of educational policy and practice in New South Wales, the promotion of excellence in school leadership, and advocacy for public education. | |
| Ashley "Ross" Bonthorne | For service to architecture and the planning and design of urban areas, to the architectural profession, to local government, and to the community. | |
| Dr James "Howard" Bradbury | For service to science as a plant biochemist, particularly through research and the development of a test kit to measure levels of cyanide in cassava and other food crops. | |
| Susanne Frances Bradley | For service to the community of the Northern Territory through support for a range of mental health, disability support, educational, civic and charitable organisations. | |
| Geoffrey Frank Brayshaw | For service to the accounting profession through executive roles with the Institute of Chartered Accountants in Australia, and to the community as a supporter of heritage and sporting organisations. | |
| Dr Diane Stapleton Bretherton | For service to psychology as an academic, particularly through the advancement of scholarship in the areas of peace, mediation and conflict resolution, and to the community as an advocate for the prevention of violence. | |
| Mary Alice Brooksbank | For service to medicine in the field of palliative care as a clinician, researcher and educator, and through contributions to professional organisations. | |
| Trevor William Brown | For service to university administration at the Swinburne University of Technology, and to the accounting profession, particularly through the development of ethical and professional standards in the areas of risk management and auditing processes. | |
| Professor Donald Bruce Bursill | For service to water quality research and resource management through a range of research and industry organisations. | |
| Sister Margaret Mary Cameron | For service to the Catholic Church through leadership of the Congregation of Dominican Sisters of Eastern Australia and the Solomon Islands, to education, particularly through the establishment of programs to assist children with hearing impairment, and to the provision of leadership and pastoral formation in the diocese of Wilcannia-Forbes. | |
| Susan Lathrop Campbell | For service to the law, particularly through the development of clinical legal education in Australia and community legal services in Victoria. | |
| Phillip John Cave | For service to the community, particularly through the provision of support services to children and young adults with disabilities, and to business as a company director. | |
| Professor Hilary Christiane Charlesworth | For service to international and human rights law through professional and supporting roles in academia, legal organisations, government bodies and non-government organisations in Australia and internationally, and through the encouragement of human rights dialogue, particularly in the area of women's rights. | |
| Emeritus Professor William Wallace "Bill" Charters | For service to engineering through the research and development of renewable energy technology, to international relations, to tertiary education, and to the Australian Co-operative Research Centre program. | |
| Dr Andrew Graham Child | For service to medicine in the fields of obstetrics and gynaecology as a clinician, teacher and administrator and through contributions to a range of professional organisations. | |
| The Reverend Martin Carew Chittleborough | For service to the community through contributions to a range of organisations assisting refugees, and to the Anglican Church of Australia. | |
| Terence Osborne Clarke | For service to the performing arts as a director, actor, writer, composer and educator. | |
| Anthony John Coates | For service to the beef cattle industry, particularly through support for the advancement of beef cattle genetics and as a judge at agricultural shows in Australia and internationally, and to the community of Eidsvold. | |
| Leslie Ernest Cooper | For service to education through the provision of learning opportunities for disadvantaged youth, and to the community of Cessnock. | |
| Dr Gwenneth Jean "Wendy" Craik | For service to the natural resource sector of the economy, particularly in the areas of fisheries, marine ecology and management of water reform, and for contributions to policies affecting rural and regional Australia. | |
| Peter Cundall | For service to the environment, particularly the protection of wilderness areas in Tasmania, and to horticulture as a presenter of gardening programs on television and radio. | |
| Dr M. Stella Dalton | For service to medicine through the establishment of treatment and rehabilitation programs for people with an alcohol or drug dependency, to professional support organisations and medical research. | |
| Alexander Walker Darling | For service to local government and to the community of the Illawarra region through a range of business and commerce, industry and public infrastructure, and arts and service projects. | |
| Peter George Dowling | For service to accountancy, particularly in the area of taxation policy and administration, and to the community through arts and education organisations and as a supporter of emerging technology based businesses. | |
| Julie Christine Dunsmore | For service to the community as a grief counsellor, to families of the victims of the 2002 Bali bombing, to youth and to raising awareness of mental health issues. | |
| Julie Patricia Dyson | For service to the performing arts through Ausdance, to the promotion of contemporary dance, and through support for dance artists and educators. | |
| Professor Keith William Entwistle | For service to the beef industry through research into the reproductive physiology of tropical beef cattle, and to veterinary education. | |
| Professor Murray David Esler | For service to medical science through research in the area of human cardiovascular neuroscience, and to the development of health policy and treatment therapies. | |
| Dr Alan Edwin Farnsworth | For service to medicine as a cardiothoracic surgeon, to medical education and the development of new procedures, and as a volunteer medical practitioner in Asia and the Pacific. | |
| The Honourable Frederick Arthur Finch | For service to the community of the Northern Territory through the Legislative Assembly, particularly portfolio responsibilities of education, health and public works, to the surf lifesaving movement, and to Rugby Union football. | |
| Professor Christopher Charles Findlay | For service to international relations in the Asia-Pacific region, to economic co-operation in trade, transportation and economic reform, and to education. | |
| Gordon Conway French | For service to the dairy industry through a range of executive roles with organisations concerned with industry research, reform, training and education, and to natural resource management. | |
| Patrick Vincent Gay | For service to the construction industry, particularly residential and industrial property development, to educational and youth social welfare organisations, and to the sport of game fishing. | |
| Dr Richard John Gee | For service to international relations, particularly through significant contributions to the advancement of multilateralism, disarmament and the elimination of weapons of mass destruction. | |
| Associate Professor David John Gillett | For service to medicine, particularly in the field of breast cancer research and education, to the development of multidisciplinary systems of care for patients, and as a surgeon. | |
| Dr Sheila Given | For service to the community through contributions to a range of state government committees and community organisations on ageing policy, and to education in Tasmania. | |
| Dr Anthony James "Tony" Gould | For service to the arts as a music educator, particularly through the Victorian College of the Arts, to the promotion of jazz and improvised music, and as a pianist and composer. | |
| Denise Green | For service to the arts, particularly as an abstract painter and as an author, and through the promotion of Australian art and artists internationally. | |
| Professor Michelle Haber | For service to science in the field of research into childhood cancer, to scientific education, and to the community. | |
| Evelyn Nyirrmaria Hall | For service to the Indigenous community as an advocate for land rights, social justice, and the economic advancement and education of traditional owners in the Kimberley region. | |
| Richard Ian Hanger QC | For service to the law, particularly through the development of alternative dispute resolution methods and procedures, and to music. | |
| Christine Dorothy Hardwick | For service to the community and local government through the Western Australian Local Government Association and the Shire of Mount Marshall, and to rural road safety. | |
| John Harnden | For service to sports administration, particularly through contributions to the planning and coordination of the Melbourne 2006 Commonwealth Games. | |
| Professor Clive Gordon Harper | For service to medicine in the field of neuroscience, particularly research into the neuropathological consequences of alcohol-related brain damage, and through contributions to public health policy. | |
| Professor John Preston Harris | For service to medicine, particularly through the advancement of vascular surgery and ultrasound procedures and techniques, to medical education and curriculum development, and to public health administration. | |
| John Harold Heard | For service to business and commerce through a range of executive roles in financial, educational, sporting, arts and charitable organisations, and to the economic development of South Australia. | |
| Professor Richard Leigh Henry | For service to paediatric respiratory medicine as a clinician, researcher, educator and mentor, and serving in a range of roles with professional medical organisations. | |
| Professor Brian Andrew Hills | For service to medical research, particularly in the fields of respiratory physiology and decompression sickness as an educator and author. | |
| Francis "David" Hockings | For service to horticulture through commercial development of the native plant and flower industry. | |
| Griffith "John" Hodgkinson | For service to education, particularly through the Australian Secondary Principals' Association, to the promotion of professional education development programs, and to the community. | |
| Raymond Kenneth Horsburgh | For service to the steel industry and to the community through organisations providing developmental and educational assistance for disadvantaged youth. | |
| Noelene Elizabeth Horton | For service to education, particularly through executive roles with professional associations, to the promotion of effective leadership in schools, and to the community. | |
| Brother Paul Ignatius Hough | For service to education, particularly as Headmaster of St Joseph's College, and to Indigenous youth through the provision of education development opportunities, pastoral care programs and cross-cultural initiatives. | |
| Emeritus Professor Anthony Keith House | For service to medicine, particularly in the fields of liver and kidney transplantations, to rural and remote health, and to education. | |
| Frederick Harold Hyde OAM | For service to international relations, particularly as the Director of the Co-operation in Development program, and to children through the establishment of schools and orphanages in remote communities in Bangladesh. | |
| Robert Roger Ingpen | For service to literature as an illustrator and author of children's books, to art design and education, and as a supporter of health care organisations. | |
| Gus Irdi | For service to the community through a range of youth, social welfare and educational organisations, including Youth Focus, and to the law. | |
| Peter Alexander Ivany | For service to the community through a range of fundraising, Jewish, arts and sporting organisations, to medical research and public health, and to business education. | |
| The Honourable David Francis Jackson QC | For service to the legal profession as a leading practitioner in the fields of constitutional and appellate law, as a contributor to the development of professional organisations associated with the law, and through roles in the area of professional education. | |
| Professor Ian Ronald Johnston | For service to the transport industry, particularly the promotion of road safety through the Monash University Accident Research Centre, to maritime safety, and to a range of professional industry organisations. | |
| Dr June Ellen Kane | For service to the international community through a range of advisory, teaching and planning roles with organisations involved in reducing the exploitation of children throughout the world. | |
| Elizabeth Keam | For service to community health in the field of palliative care through contributions to the development of programs and services to assist people with a terminal illness, and to nurse education. | |
| Ross William Kelly | For service to Indigenous youth through the Clontarf Foundation, to Australian Rules football, to business as a company director, and to the development of water resource policy in Western Australia. | |
| Donald Neil Kerley | For service to Australian Rules football in South Australia as a player and coach, and to the community as a supporter of a range of charitable organisations. | |
| Kevin Thomas Kerr | For service to engineering and civil infrastructure development in western Queensland, and to the community of Barcaldine. | |
| James Thomas King | For service to the community through the development and introduction of a range of policing programs dealing with crime prevention and child safety, to improving the professional education and training of the security industry, and to charitable organisations. | |
| Ian Reginald Knop | For service to business, particularly to industry development in Tasmania, and to the community through a range of executive roles with energy, finance, sporting and Indigenous support organisations. | |
| Aristidis Eric Koundouris | For service to the community as a benefactor to a range of charitable organisations, to multicultural groups through executive roles, and to business and employment in the Australian Capital Territory. | |
| Commissioner Ivan Bramwell Lang | For service to the community through a range of executive, public relations and social welfare roles with The Salvation Army, and as a supporter of disadvantaged people in Southern Asia, the South Pacific and East Asia. | |
| Valerie Joan "Val" Lang | For service to women living in rural and regional communities, particularly by improving social and economic conditions through the Foundation for Australian Agricultural Women, and to the environment, health and education. | |
| William Gingell Lawrence | For service to medical administration through executive roles in health management organisations in rural and urban areas, to professional training and education of health administrators, and to research support organisations. | |
| Peter Frederick Lazar | For service to business, particularly in the field of public relations, to communication and dental health education, and to the community through aged care, health, cultural and social welfare organisations. | |
| Ferdinando "Nando" Lelli | For service to industrial relations as an advocate for the rights of steel industry workers, and to the development of employment opportunities for people with a disability. | |
| Colin William Love | For service to sport as an administrator of Rugby League football at national and international levels, to sports law, and to the staging of sporting events. | |
| Philip Norman Lovel | For service to the transport industry through the Victorian Transport Association, particularly road transport and workplace safety, to the implementation of safer and higher productivity vehicles, and to community liaison on behalf of the industry. | |
| Kathleen Vera McCormack | For service to the community of the Illawarra region through the development and implementation of a range of social welfare services, particularly through Centacare. | |
| Professor John Joseph McGrath | For service to medicine in the field of schizophrenia research through the Queensland Centre for Mental Health Research, to psychiatric education, and to a range of professional medical organisations. | |
| Marie Rosalind McGrath-Kerr | For service to small business operators in the postal industry through the Post Office Agents Association, and to the community. | |
| John Lauchlan McIntosh | For service to the community through significant contributions to the development and promotion of road and motor vehicle safety programs, and to the mining industry. | |
| Dr James Hector McLachlan | For service to the community through the introduction of wide-ranging innovations leading to improved operation and management of the Ambulance Service of New South Wales. | |
| Peter Donald MacLean PSM | For service to the community through cemetery and crematoria facility management. | |
| Sister Clare Agnes McShee | For service to the community through programs that support the rehabilitation of prisoners and provide assistance to their families. | |
| Benjamin Wickham MacDonald | For service to business and commerce through executive roles with a range of investment, banking and agricultural organisations, and to the community as a supporter of charitable and sporting bodies. | |
| The Reverend Dr Elizabeth Bernice Mackinlay | For service to the welfare of aged people, particularly through the establishment of the Centre for Ageing and Pastoral Studies, to nurse education, to the Anglican Church of Australia, and to the community. | |
| Susanne Lorraine Macri | For service to the community in the area of aged care, particularly in the review and development of industry standards, accreditation and future management practices, and to nurse education and training. | |
| Dr Peter Lewis Malycha | For service to medicine through research and development of new procedures for the diagnosis and treatment of breast cancer, to medical education, and to professional organisations. | |
| Sister Toni Margaret Matha | For service to the community, particularly the provision and development of services through the St Vincent de Paul Society, to people suffering from mental illness and drug and alcohol addiction, and to education. | |
| Richard Herbert Menteith | For service to the community through the Wesley Mission and a range of church and Christian organisations. | |
| Ian Stanley Mickel | For service to local government through the Western Australian Local Government Association and the Shire of Esperance. | |
| Philip Gregory Molyneux | For service to a range of medical research, health and community organisations through the provision of financial management expertise. | |
| Jocelyn Heather Murphy | For service to the community, particularly through the YWCA of New South Wales, and to a range of other youth, charitable, health, human rights and sports organisations. | |
| Dr Brian Wallace Neldner | For service to international humanitarian aid programs, particularly through the Lutheran World Federation and the International Council of Voluntary Agencies. | |
| Professor Desmond Francis Nicholls | For service to statistical science in Australia as an academic and through a range of professional organisations, and to the community. | |
| Annmaree O'Keeffe | For service to international relations, particularly through the Australian Agency for International Development, and in the areas of HIV/AIDS policy and program development. | |
| Dr Richard John Olive RFD | For service to dentistry, particularly through a range of professional organisations and the Royal Australian Army Dental Corps, and to dental education. | |
| Dr Svante Rikard Orell | For service to medicine in the field of diagnostic pathology, particularly through the introduction and use of fine needle aspiration biopsy, and to continuing medical education and training. | |
| Professor Michael Geoffrey O'Rourke | For service to medicine as a surgeon, to medical education and training, and to research in the field of melanoma treatment. | |
| The Reverend Dr Donald William Owers | For service to the community through raising awareness of the sexual abuse of children and to ensuring justice and support for victims. | |
| Paul Anthony Pholeros | For service to the community by improving the living conditions and, consequently, the health of Indigenous communities through the design, development and improvement of housing and the surrounding living environment and working with, and creating employment for, local Indigenous people. | |
| Michael Ramsden | For service to the media and communications industry through a range of executive roles with broadcasting and regulatory organisations. | |
| Dr Gregor Allen Ramsey | For service to education, particularly through contributions to higher education, the vocational education and training sector, and programs committed to quality teaching and school leadership. | |
| Dr John Phillip Rayner | For service to education, particularly in the areas of electronics engineering and physics, and to the community through the development and delivery of science enrichment programs. | |
| Gillian Armstrong "Judy" Richardson | For service to the community through the Country Women's Association of New South Wales and to local government in the Bellingen Shire. | |
| John Frederick Ridge | For service to the information technology industry, particularly through the promotion and development of professional organisations and the creation of educational opportunities. | |
| The Honourable Neil Maxwell Robson | For service to electoral reform through the voting system, to the Tasmanian Parliament, and to fishing and community organisations. | |
| John Stuart Ross | For service to local government through organisations contributing to a broad range of national and state policy issues, and the Tatiara District Council. | |
| The Honourable Justice Stephen Craig Rothman | For service to the Jewish community of New South Wales through executive roles in communal organisations and educational institutions, to the law, and to industrial relations. | |
| Gordon Albert Salier | For service to the legal profession, particularly through a range of roles with the Law Society of New South Wales and in the field of cost assessment. | |
| Salah Hamed Salman | For service to education as Academy Director General of the Australian International Academy of Education, and to the community through the promotion of inter-cultural relations. | |
| Alan Schwartz | For service to the community, particularly through Jewish welfare organisations and as co-founder of the corporate social responsibility organisation, SEAL Force, and to business. | |
| Emeritus Professor Benjamin Klaas Selinger | For service to science education and to the community, particularly as a communicator of scientific issues to increase consumer awareness and ensure public access to goods and services that meet appropriate standards. | |
| Professor Bruce Sugriv Singh | For service to psychiatry through medical education and training, contributions to mental health research and reform, and the development of clinical services. | |
| Roslyn Frances Smorgon | For service to the community through fundraising and support for a range of Jewish, arts, women's health and sporting organisations. | |
| Warren Edward Somerville | For service to natural history and to the community through developing a significant and valuable collection of minerals and fossils donated to the Australian Mineral and Fossil Museum at Bathurst. | |
| Julian Bellin Stock | For service to the community, particularly through contributions to corporate governance, financial planning and management of the State Library of Victoria. | |
| The Honourable George Joseph Strickland | For service to the Western Australian Parliament as Speaker of the Legislative Assembly, to local government, and to the community. | |
| Meredith Marjory Sussex | For service to sports administration through contributions to the planning and coordination of the Melbourne 2006 Commonwealth Games, and to the education and training sector. | |
| Professor Paul Winston Thomas | For service to higher education, particularly through the development and administration of the University of the Sunshine Coast, and to the establishment of educational links with China and Japan. | |
| The Reverend Dr Michael Francis Trainor | For service to education, particularly in the areas of theology and archeology, to international and inter-faith relations, and to ecumenism. | |
| Gwen Livingstone Tremlett | For service to the Indigenous community in the Northern Territory through the translation of the Kriol Bible, as a teacher of home economics, and as a missionary. | |
| Lance John Tremlett | For service to the Indigenous community in the Northern Territory through the translation of the Kriol Bible, administrative roles within local communities, and as a missionary. | |
| Pamela May Tye OAM | For service to hockey through the development of a strong and cohesive national association, and to sport administration in general through a range of leadership and administrative roles. | |
| Professor Graham Vernon Vimpani | For service to medicine as a paediatrician committed to improving child health and welfare through contributions to a range of government, professional and community organisations, and as an academic, researcher and clinician. | |
| Lynette Mary "Lynne" Wannan | For service in the areas of social policy development, education, and children's services through leadership and advisory roles with a range of government and community organisations. | |
| John Edward "Jack" Waterford | For service to journalism, particularly as a commentator on national politics, the law, to raising debate on ethical issues and public sector accountability, and to the community in the area of Indigenous affairs. | |
| Peter Roy Watts | For leadership in the conservation and preservation of cultural heritage in Australia, particularly through the Historic Houses Trust of New South Wales and the Australian Garden History Society, and to the arts. | |
| William John Weatherstone | For service to conservation and the environment through research, implementing and promoting ecologically sustainable farming practices, and sharing knowledge with the community to improve land care. | |
| Dianne Lesley Weidner OAM | For service to the promotion and conservation of Australia's Indigenous, natural and historic heritage, particularly through the National Trust of Australia. | |
| Dr Carolyn Mary West | For service to medicine and as an advocate for the protection and promotion of the wellbeing of people living with disabilities, particularly spina bifida. | |
| Ralph Derwyn "Wal" Whalley | For service to conservation and the environment, particularly through research into Australian native grasses and the promotion of their use for pasture, lawn and revegetation of degraded natural landscapes. | |
| Dr Robert Houston Wilson | For service to the pork industry through a range of research and producer organisations, contributions to business development and market expansion, and improved farm management practices to protect the environment. | |
| Alla Wolf-Tasker | For service to the development and promotion of regional tourism and the hospitality industry through a range of organisations. | |
| Bishop Mar Meelis Zaia | For service to the community through the Holy Apostolic Catholic Assyrian Church of the East and through the development of a range of educational facilities. | |

==== Military Division ====
| Branch | Recipient | Citation | Notes |
|---|---|---|---|
| Navy | Commander Jonathan Dallas Mead RAN | For exceptional service in warlike operations as the Commanding Officer HMAS PARRAMATTA in the Northern Arabian Gulf during Operation CATALYST. | |
| Navy | Commodore Les Nikolas Pataky CSC, RAN | For exceptional service as the Commander, Australian Navy Surface Combatant Group, the Deputy Maritime Commander and Chief of Staff Maritime Headquarters, the Australian Defence Force Liaison Officer to the United States Joint Chiefs of Staff and President of the Sea King Board of Inquiry. | |
| Army | Brigadier John Graham Caligari DSC | For exceptional performance of duties in command and senior Army staff appointments. | |
| Army | Principal Chaplain Leonard Sidney Eacott | For exceptional service and outstanding devotion to duty as Principal Chaplain – Army and Head of Corps, Royal Australian Army Chaplains’ Department. | |
| Army | Colonel Lindsay Cameron Morton | For exceptional service and meticulous sustainment planning of operational logistic support as part of the deployed staff during Operation FALCONER, and for the delivery of logistic support to deployed Australian Defence Force elements and the rationalisation of domestic supply chain contracts and operations in his capacity as Operations Officer and Director Logistic Support within Joint Logistics Command. | |
| Army | Lieutenant Colonel Cheryl Ann Pearce | For exceptional service as the Commandant, Defence Police Training Centre, the Provost Marshal, Army and the Commanding Officer of the 1st Military Police Battalion. | |
| Army | Colonel Richard Hugh Stanhope | For exceptional service as the Commandant Army Recruit Training Centre from 2002 to 2003 and as the Commander Combat Training Centre from 2004 to 2006. | |
| Army | Brigadier Ian Denis Westwood | For exceptional service in the field of military law, particularly as the Chief Judge Advocate. | |
| Air Force | Air Commodore Timothy Francis Owen | For exceptional service in the development of the Royal Australian Air Force's surveillance and response capability. | |
| Air Force | Warrant Officer Raymond Ashley Woolnough | For exceptional service to the Royal Australian Air Force in the performance of his duties as a Warrant Officer Disciplinary across several senior appointments. | |
| Air Force | Wing Commander Gregory David Young CSC | For exceptional service in the field of aircraft systems engineering. | |

=== Medal (OAM) ===
==== General Division ====
| Recipient | Citation | Notes |
|---|---|---|
| Janice Margaret Ackland | For service to the community of the Sutherland Shire, particularly in the fields of aged and pastoral care. | |
| Raymond Thomas Adams | For service to the community through a range of leadership roles with Rotary International and involvement in humanitarian assistance projects. | |
| Jennifer Anne Anderson | For service to the community, particularly through a range of social welfare and church organisations. | |
| Robin Christine Anderson | For service to the community through a range of musical, youth and women's groups. | |
| Colin Fife Angas | For service to the community of Angaston, particularly through rural fire service and local government roles. | |
| John Antonelli | For service to veterans and their families. | |
| Natalie Gladys Armstrong | For service to the community of Delegate, particularly through the Delegate Progress Association. | |
| Reginald James Arrold | For service to ex-service personnel and their families in the Cooma-Monaro Shire. | |
| Douglas Ross Arrowsmith DFC | For service to veterans and their families through the Nedlands Sub-Branch of the Returned and Services League of Australia, to the community and to lawn bowls. | |
| Emeritus Professor Elizabeth Anne Ashburn | For service to the visual arts, to contemporary Australian art, to education and to the community. | |
| Laurel Margaret Asimus | For service to the community of the Maroochy Shire through church, service, welfare and aged care groups. | |
| Michael Plant Atchison | For service to the community as a political and social commentator through the print media, and as an author and cartoonist. | |
| Harry Atlas | For service to the Jewish community of Perth and to small business development. | |
| Charles Edward Aust | For service to ex-service personnel and their families, and to the community of the Eurobodalla Shire. | |
| Dr Walter John Backhouse | For service to the community of Geelong through a range of arts, educational and aged care organisations, and to the law. | |
| Douglass Hinton Baglin | For service to the community as a photographer of the Indigenous people, plants and wildlife of Australia, Papua New Guinea and the Pacific Islands, and of historic buildings, particularly in the Hunters Hill district. | |
| Valma Grace Baldwin | For service to the community, particularly through Zonta International, and to education. | |
| Dr Peter Deane Barnard | For service to the community in the areas of preventive and public health dentistry in Australia and the Pacific Rim, through dental epidemiological studies, and to education. | |
| Michael Robert Beech | For service to the community through a range of educational, church, service and sporting organisations. | |
| Edmund Ernest Beilharz | For service to education and to the community of the Bendigo region through promoting, establishing and encouraging musical appreciation and performance. | |
| Wayne Laurence Belcher | For service to the community, particularly through developing and promoting new initiatives in the aged care industry. | |
| Ann Louise Belmont | For service to education through the Gifted and Talented Children's Association of South Australia, and to the community. | |
| Peter John Bennett | For service to the community through the Employers Making a Difference organisation encouraging employment of people with disabilities. | |
| Ralph William Berman | For service to the gamefowl community as a breeder, judge, author and artist, and through the Oxford Old English Game Fanciers Association of Australia. | |
| Bruno Biti | For service to the community of Culcairn through service, aged care, sporting and business organisations. | |
| Gary Edward Blaschke | For service to sport through the Disabled Surfers Association of Australia, and to the environment. | |
| Jill Elizabeth Boehm | For service to the community through advocacy and support for people with cancer and their families and carers. | |
| Anthony Derek Bond | For service to the visual arts as a curator, and through stimulating debate about and public understanding of contemporary international art. | |
| John Clouston Bond | For service to the community through the activities of the National Sorry Day Committee. | |
| Betty Ann Born | For service to people with intellectual disabilities through the Uniting Church's Crossroads program, and to the community. | |
| Steven John Bradbury | For service to sport as a Gold Medallist at the Salt Lake City 2002 Winter Olympic Games. | |
| Rhonda Kay Brain | For service to education, particularly through developing and promoting the community-based Birth to Kindergarten - Spread the Word literacy program. | |
| Wolfgang Paul Bredereck | For service to the community of Coonabarabran through a range of tourism, agricultural and local government roles. | |
| Colin Herbert Brideson | For service to the community though a range of service, church and educational organisations. | |
| Christine Pamela Brierley | For service to women's cricket as a player, official and promoter of the sport, and as a contributor to amalgamation with the International Cricket Council. | |
| Patrick Joseph Bright | For service to veterans and their families through the Vietnam Veterans' Association of Australia and the Totally and Permanently Incapacitated Veterans Association of New South Wales. | |
| Neville Edwin Brown | For service to youth through the Scouting movement. | |
| John Saxon Bryant | For service to the community of the Lower Hunter region as a fundraiser for and supporter of a range of charitable, civic, aged care and sporting groups. | |
| Bettina "Tina" Buckley | For service to the community through the All Souls' Opportunity Shop. | |
| Vincent "Vince" Bulger | For service to the community of the Tumut Shire through activities promoting Indigenous culture, tradition and reconciliation, teaching appreciation of the natural environment, and through support for elderly and infirm people. | |
| Laurel Una Burge | For service to the community through the Society of Australian Genealogists. | |
| Jean Elizabeth Burling | For service to surf lifesaving through a range of roles at national, state and club level, and developing lifesaving programs in Bali. | |
| Dr Charles William Butcher | For service to rural and remote medicine in the Northern Territory, and to the community. | |
| Colin Stewart Campbell | For service to horticulture, particularly as a contributor to a range of gardening-related television and radio programs and publications. | |
| Alisa Peta Camplin | For service to sport as a Gold Medallist at the Salt Lake City 2002 Winter Olympic Games. | |
| Lawrence Michael Carew | For service to the arts, particularly through the visual merchandising industry, and to the community as a supporter of fundraising activities associated with charity balls, dinners and appeals. | |
| The Reverend Dr Philip John Carr | For service to the community through the Uniting Church in Australia and providing counselling and support for people with advanced illnesses. | |
| Robert Lloyd "Bob" Carr | For service to the veteran community through the 'N' Class Destroyers Association of Queensland and the Naval Association of Australia. | |
| Ian Clifton Carroll | For service to the community through a range of educational, sporting, social welfare and cultural organisations. | |
| Dr Brian Williams Carss | For service in the field of continuing education, particularly through the Australian and New Zealand College for Seniors, and to the community through Rotary International. | |
| Dr Frank Maurice "Maurie" Cave | For service to the community of Rockhampton as a general practitioner and through the Australian Volunteer Coast Guard. | |
| Hanni Chalmers | For service to the Jewish community, particularly through the Jewish Centre on Ageing. | |
| Christopher Jeffrey Chenoweth | For service to the law, and to the community of the Australian Capital Territory through contributions to a range of school, youth, cultural and welfare groups. | |
| Leonardo Luigi "Lennie" Chiesa | For service to the community of the Hinchinbrook Shire through surf lifesaving and junior Rugby League football. | |
| Faye Marlene Clark RFD | For service to ex-service personnel and their families, and to the community of Molong. | |
| Prudence Alice Clarke | For service to education and to the community, particularly as Convenor of the ACT Children's Week Committee. | |
| Phillip James Clowry | For service to the welfare of veterans and their families through the Veterans Support and Advocacy Service, and to the community. | |
| Richard Sternberg Cohen | For service to business and commerce through retail development projects in Adelaide, and to the community. | |
| Alan Ernest Cole | For service to the community of Cardinia through environmental and aged care organisations. | |
| Brian Condon | For service to the community, particularly through the Rotary Club of Port Pirie and the International Fellowship of Flying Rotarians. | |
| Dr John Short Conroy | For service to primary education, particularly in the field of mathematics, and to the community through school, social welfare and health groups. | |
| Dr Paul Conway | For service to the community, particularly through the National Council of Jewish Women of Australia, and to the law. | |
| Zina Conway | For service to the community, particularly through the National Council of Jewish Women of Australia. | |
| Valda Ruth Corbett | For service to the community, particularly through the 40 Hour Famine for World Vision Australia. | |
| The Reverend Peter James Corney | For service to the Anglican Church of Australia, particularly through the development of creative programs to meet contemporary community needs. | |
| Geoffrey Arthur Cowles | For service to the community through a range of youth, sporting and church groups. | |
| William John Craven | For service to the community of Tatura, particularly through church and agricultural organisations and the Tatura Cemetery Trust. | |
| Theresa Margaret Creagh | For service to education, particularly through senior administrative roles within the Catholic education system in Queensland. | |
| Terrence Arthur Crooks | For service to the funeral industry, particularly through the Australian Institute of Embalming, and to the community. | |
| Donald Murray Cross | For service to the community, particularly as a volunteer with the Global Interaction program of the Baptist Union of Australia. | |
| Horace Sylvester Cross MBE | For service to the veteran community through a range of ex-service organisations including the Royal Australian Armoured Corps Association and the Returned and Services League of Australia. | |
| Carl Bryce Crossin | For service to music, particularly as a choral conductor and founding director of the Adelaide Chamber Singers. | |
| Paul Stanley Crowe | For service to education and to horticulture through the Victorian Schools' Garden Awards | |
| Malcolm James Cusick | For service to the thoroughbred racing industry in New South Wales. | |
| Geoffrey "John" Dalziel | For service to the community in the areas of social justice and welfare through The Salvation Army. | |
| Janice Eleanor Danaher | For service to the community of Hastings through the Scouting movement and local church, aged care and sporting groups. | |
| Edna Margaret Daniels | For service to ex-service personnel and their families, and to the community of Toukley. | |
| Dr Andris Peteris Darzins | For service to medicine as a general practitioner and as a contributor to the development of aged care facilities in South Australia. | |
| John Edward Date | For service to the community through providing assistance and support for the programs of a range of Catholic religious orders. | |
| The Reverend Brenton James Daulby | For service to the community through chaplaincy roles supporting serving and retired police and defence force personnel. | |
| William Athol Dawson | For service to the community through programs supporting children with a disability, veterans and their families, and youth leadership and skills development. | |
| William John de Burgh | For service to the community, particularly through recording and preserving local and Western Australian history, and through local government in the Shire of Gingin. | |
| Neill Decker | For service to the welfare of people with diabetes, particularly as a contributor to the development of Diabetes Australia. | |
| Ruth Ricardo de Fegely | For service to political life in Victoria through the Liberal Party of Australia, and to the community of Ararat. | |
| Kevin Walter Dellar | For service to local government and to the community through activities contributing to business, infrastructure, agricultural and sports development in the Horsham district. | |
| The Reverend Michael Harold Dennis | For service to the Baptist Union of New South Wales and to the community, particularly through development and outreach activities in the Thornleigh area. | |
| Peter John Derrett | For service to drama education and to the performing arts in the Northern Rivers region. | |
| Reginald "Garth" Dixon | For service to conservation and the environment, particularly as a contributor to the preservation of native vegetation in the south-eastern region of New South Wales. | |
| Monica Karen Dodd | For service to the community of the Eyre Peninsula, particularly through the Eastern Eyre Rural Counselling Service, and as a contributor to the development of programs supporting women. | |
| Lieutenant Colonel Clifford Francis Dodds (Retired) | For service to the community through the Royal Australian Artillery National Museum, and through professional, service and sporting organisations. | |
| Patrick Hugh Doherty | For service to road transport and to the community, particularly through the Royal Automobile Club of Queensland. | |
| Stanley "Brian" Dorey BEM | For service to local government and to the community of the Livingstone Shire as a contributor to business, service, tourism, educational, emergency services and sporting organisations. | |
| Kym Michelle Dowdell | For service to gymnastics, particularly in the area of technical skills development, and as a coach, international judge and mentor. | |
| David Clyde Dridan | For service to the arts and to the community, particularly as a contributor to the Fleurieu Peninsula Biennale and associated programs supporting tourism and the regional wine industry. | |
| Adjunct Associate Professor Norton Archie Duckmanton RFD | For service to veterans and their families and to dentistry as a practitioner and educator in the area of prosthodontics. | |
| Cyril Ray Dunford | For service to the community of Parkes through ex-service, sporting and service organisations, and as a fundraiser for charitable causes. | |
| Marie Marguerita Dunn | For service to netball, particularly as a contributor to the development of the Parramatta-Auburn Netball Association. | |
| Martin Robertson Dunn | For service to the profession of dental prosthetics, particularly as a contributor in the area of skills development. | |
| Pamela Ann Dunsford | For service to the wine industry as an oenologist, judge and promoter of the role of women in the field, to business development and to tourism. | |
| Dr John Douglas Dyce | For service to medicine as a general practitioner and to the community of Forbes. | |
| Kevin Arthur Eddy | For service to the community and to youth through the Scouting movement in Victoria. | |
| David Kelman Evans | For service to the community, particularly as a contributor to the establishment of the Tamworth Waler Memorial. | |
| Ian Charles Everist | For service to engineering, particularly in the area of water and sewerage management, and to the community. | |
| John Thomas Fakes | For service to the welfare of veterans and their families in South Australia. | |
| Peter Ronald Falk | For service to sport, particularly Rugby Union football, and to the community as a fundraiser for medical and ex-service organisations. | |
| Ralph Henry Fardon | For service to local government, and to the community through church, service and aged care organisations. | |
| Kenneth William Farmer | For service to the community, particularly as a contributor to the development of the Kiwanis movement in South Australia. | |
| Warren Edward Featherby | For service to the community through a range of ex-service organisations, and as initiator and coordinator of The Spirit of Gallipoli project. | |
| Pauline Ann Feehan | For service to the community through education in the areas of natural family planning and reproductive health. | |
| David "John" Fensom | For service to the community in the fields of water management and agriculture, and through heritage, business, service and aged care organisations in the Hillston area. | |
| Robert Kevin Ferrari | For service to the community through the Apex Magic Castle Chalet for disadvantaged children and as a supporter of ex-service organisations. | |
| Raymond Colin Ferres | For service to the community through the Apex Magic Castle Chalet for disadvantaged children and as a supporter of ex-service organisations. | |
| Thomas Patrick Fitzgerald | For service to the community of Kyogle through health sector, church and business organisations. | |
| Terrence Rodney "Terry" Flanagan | For service to the motor vehicle repair industry, particularly through the Motor Traders' Association of New South Wales. | |
| William Frederick Foster | For service to the community, particularly through preserving and promoting Tasmania's maritime heritage. | |
| Olivier Andre Foubert | For service to business, particularly through the French-Australian Business Club of South Australia, to tourism and to the community. | |
| Julie Diane Francis | For service to the community as a contributor to child and youth development organisations and programs in South Australia. | |
| Bernard Freedman | For service to journalism and to the community, particularly as a correspondent and political editor of Australian Jewish News. | |
| Raymond Charles French | For service to the community through a range of welfare, civic and sporting organisations, and to the cotton industry in Queensland. | |
| Ernest Friedlander | For service to the community as a contributor to the programs of B'nai B'rith. | |
| Dr Adam Gregory Frost | For service to the community through the provision of medical aid to victims of the 2005 Bali bombing. | |
| Dr Alan Arthur Garner | For service to emergency, disaster and retrieval medicine, particularly through activities associated with CareFlight. | |
| Beverley Anne Garton | For service to children with disabilities, particularly as an adoptive and foster parent. | |
| Paul Anthony Garton | For service to children with disabilities, particularly as an adoptive and foster parent. | |
| Robert Frederick Geelan | For service to people with intellectual disabilities and their families through the Crowle Foundation. | |
| Jean Irene Gell | For service to athletics in Victoria as a competitor, manager and official, and as a contributor to the development of women's athletics. | |
| Vyonne Marie Geneve | For service to the community through recording and preserving Art Deco architecture and art in Western Australia. | |
| Carmelo Genovese | For service to the Italian community of Perth through a range of welfare and cultural organisations, and to vocational education. | |
| John Frederick George | For service to ex-service personnel and their families, particularly through the Korea and South East Asia Forces Association. | |
| Janis Louise Gerard | For service to education, particularly as Principal of Bathurst High School, and as a contributor to the New South Wales Secondary Principals' Council. | |
| Margaret Jean Gibbons | For service to veterans and their families through the Royal Australian Regiment National Memorial Walk. | |
| Timothy John Giles | For service to hockey through a range of technical, administrative and coaching roles, and to the community. | |
| Samuel Harold Ginsberg | For service to the community through the provision of humanitarian assistance and voluntary psychological services for people affected by natural disasters and war. | |
| Kenneth Norman Gladstone | For service to the welfare of veterans and their families through the 2/31 Australian Infantry Battalion Association of New South Wales, and to the community. | |
| The Reverend Ross Murray Godfrey RFD | For service to the community of Wellington and to Knox Grammar School, particularly through ministry activities with the Uniting Church in Australia. | |
| Brian Thomas Goldburg | For service to the community of Gympie through musical and amateur theatre groups, and as a fundraiser for charitable organisations. | |
| Vivian "Charles" Goodwin-Dorning | For service to the arts, particularly through the development of the Frankston Arts Centre. | |
| Brigadier Patrick Thomas Gowans (Retired) | For service to veterans and their families through the Australian Veterans' Children Assistance Trust. | |
| Robert John "Bob" Greaves | For service to the community through the provision of therapeutic play activities for children in hospital, and to education. | |
| Dr Anthony John Green | For service to medicine through the provision of specialist surgical services to the rural communities of Far North Queensland. | |
| Dennis Allan Green BEM | For service to canoeing and kayaking, and to the surf lifesaving movement, as a competitor and coach. | |
| Juris Greste | For service to urban design, particularly through raising community awareness of the need for high quality and sustainable environments, to professional associations and to education. | |
| Timothy John Green | For service to engineering, particularly through the Association of Professional Engineers, Scientists and Managers of Australia, and to the community of Rockhampton. | |
| Brian John Grogan | For service to the community through a range of water resource, environmental, local government, educational and church organisations. | |
| Eva Maria Gruszka | For service to the Polish community through a range of cultural activities. | |
| Brian Ernest Haffenden | For service to the community through providing assistance to people with drug or alcohol dependencies and their families to access treatment programs, and as a supporter of humanitarian aid projects. | |
| Rayleen Ann Haig | For service to local government and to the community through health, historical and aged care organisations, particularly within the City of Bayside, and to the National Council of Women of Australia. | |
| Joan Leslie Hamilton | For service to the community of Goondiwindi, particularly as a fundraiser for health and emergency services groups. | |
| Kevin Cyril Hamilton | For service to the community through fundraising activities for charitable organisations, and as a member of the South Australian Parliament. | |
| Marjorie Catherine Hamilton | For service to the community through fundraising activities for charitable organisations, and as a member of the South Australian Parliament. | |
| Alan William Hampson | For service to medical science through research into the influenza virus and vaccinations, and to public health. | |
| Jean Durran Hancock | For service to the community through aged care, disability, emergency services and volunteer organisations. | |
| John Hans | For service to archery at local, state and national levels, and to young people with special needs. | |
| Roy William Hartman | For service to the community of Cairns through a range of ex-service, youth and health groups. | |
| Keith Mortimer Hayes | For service to the community of Timor-Leste through the Independent Trust of the 2/2nd Commando Association, and to veterans and their families. | |
| Keith Healey | For service to building and construction through a range of organisations in the ceramic tile industry, to vocational training and education, and to the community. | |
| Thea Mildred Heness | For service to the community through legal aid, mediation and aged care organisations. | |
| Mary Agnes Herbert | For service to junior soccer in the Illawarra region. | |
| Esme Peggy "Peg" Herron | For service to veterans and their families through the 2/1 and 2/2 Pioneer Battalions Association. | |
| Maxwell David Herron | For service to veterans and their families through the 2/1 and 2/2 Pioneer Battalions Association, and to the Scouting movement. | |
| Leonie Sheedy Hewitt | For service to the community through the organisations Care Leavers of Australia Network and the Donor Conception Support Group of Australia. | |
| Colonel William John Hill MBE, ED (Retired) | For service to youth through philanthropic support for the Scouting movement. | |
| Margo Jane Hodge | For service to people with disabilities, particularly as a contributor to developing transport standards and as an advocate for better support services and access to employment, and to the community. | |
| Toni Margaret Horsey | For service to the community through a range of health and aged care, service and school organisations. | |
| Leah Hannah Horwitz | For service to music education as a piano teacher, examiner, adjudicator and performer. | |
| James Patrick Howard | For service to the community, particularly through the social support services of the Catholic Church in Australia. | |
| Dennis George Howe | For service to the community of Cairns, particularly as a supporter of transport, commerce and educational organisations. | |
| Joy Elaine Hruby | For service to the arts and the entertainment industry through a range of roles, including community broadcasting. | |
| Keith Hucker | For service to the community through a range of school, welfare, sporting and historical organisations. | |
| James Stanbury Hull | For service to the community of Ryde through the Presbyterian Church of Australia, and to local government. | |
| Harry Hunt | For service to the community as a supporter of fundraising events for charitable groups, and to the City of Liverpool through a range of business, service and social welfare organisations. | |
| Maurice Edward Hunter | For service to the international community through volunteer roles with aid organisations, and to vocational education and training. | |
| Giuseppe "Joe" Inserra | For service to the community of Laverton, particularly through a range of financial, service and sporting organisations. | |
| Elizabeth Ann "Betty" Irons | For service to the Scouting movement and to the community of Maclean. | |
| Shirley May Irving | For service to the community of Robinvale through church, health, welfare and educational organisations. | |
| David Reginald Jackson | For service to the community of the Burdekin Shire, particularly through the Rotary Club of Home Hill and as a journalist. | |
| Associate Professor Martin Bernard Jarvis | For service to the arts as the founder, artistic director and conductor of the Darwin Symphony Orchestra, and to music education. | |
| Ronald Arthur Jay | For service to the community through the St Vincent de Paul Society and the Apostleship of the Sea. | |
| Jill Marie Jefferey | For service to youth through the Guiding movement in Victoria, and to the community through sporting and service organisations. | |
| Gregory Robert Johnson | For service to education through the Australian International School in Singapore, and to business and finance. | |
| Judith Ann Johnson | For service to the community through providing support and counselling services to women affected by domestic violence. | |
| Edward Menzies Jones | For service to Rugby Union football, particularly as coach of the Australian Rugby Union Team. | |
| John Maxwell Jones | For service to surf lifesaving as a competitor, coach and official, and to the community through contributions in the field of vocational education and training. | |
| Alena Karazija | For service to the Lithuanian community of Melbourne through cultural and school groups. | |
| Raymond Kearney | For service to the environment and public health, particularly through raising awareness of the health effects of motor vehicle pollution, and to the community of Lane Cove. | |
| Maurice John Kelly | For service to education and to the community through a range of charitable, church and civic organisations. | |
| Adelaide "Valerie" Kennedy | For service to the community through All Saints Anglican Church, Ainslie. | |
| Gordon Douglas Kennedy | For service to the community through All Saints Anglican Church, Ainslie. | |
| Paul Savang Khieu | For service to multiculturalism through promoting cohesion between diverse cultural groups in the Logan City region, and to the Cambodian community. | |
| Keith William Kimlin | For service to the community of Roma, particularly through the Queensland Ambulance Service. | |
| Robert William King | For service to engineering through the design and construction of oil and gas production facilities in Australia's North West Shelf region. | |
| Stephen Kinkead | For service to people with disabilities, particularly in the fields of supported accommodation and employment. | |
| Alfred John Kirby | For service to the community of Annandale through the St Vincent de Paul Society. | |
| Merron Jean Kirby | For service to the arts as an administrator, fundraiser and philanthropist, and to the community through health, aged care and welfare organisations. | |
| Kevin Lawrence Knight | For service to local government and to the community of the Golden Plains Shire, particularly through natural resource management, emergency services, historical and church organisations. | |
| Peter James Krenz | For service to youth through the Bendigo Regional YMCA group. | |
| Barbara Rose Lamb | For service to highland dancing as a teacher, adjudicator and examiner, and to the community of Gloucester. | |
| Dennis Carl Landrigan | For service to veterans and their families through the Returned and Services League of Australia, and to the community of Werris Creek. | |
| George Alfred Lang | For service to the welfare of ex-service personnel, particularly the Korean War veteran community. | |
| Stuart Grant Law | For service to cricket as a state, national and international player. | |
| John Melvyn Lawrence | For service to the community, particularly through the activities of Rotary International and the Anglican Church of Australia. | |
| Brian Edward "Mick" Laycock | For service to the community of Quairading though local government, rural health and agricultural business organisations. | |
| Pamela Edith Leard | For service to the community of Glenbrook through church, school and service groups and as a fundraiser for charitable organisations. | |
| John Francis Leckey | For service to the community of Moe, particularly through the Rotary Club of Moe, and to the funeral industry. | |
| Helen Sydney Le Huray | For service to the community, particularly in the field of aged care, through Chesalon Aged Services and the Anglican Church of Australia. | |
| Barry Charles Leslie | For service to the community, particularly through the Australian Red Cross, and through a range of sporting, youth and church groups in the Melton area. | |
| Barry Leslie Lewis | For service to the community of Port Macquarie, particularly as a contributor to preserving and restoring St Thomas' Church. | |
| Nenette Lewis | For service to the community of Port Macquarie, particularly as a contributor to preserving and restoring St Thomas' Church. | |
| John Maxwell Lippmann | For service to scuba diving safety, resuscitation and first aid training, particularly through the establishment of the Divers Alert Network Asia-Pacific. | |
| David Graham Lloyd | For service to the community, particularly through the Knights of the Southern Cross, and to the funeral industry. | |
| Allan Wright Lockwood | For service to the community of the Wimmera region through ex-service, church, health and sporting organisations, and through recording and preserving local history. | |
| Frank Geoffrey "Geoff" Loveday | For service to the community, particularly ex-service personnel and their families, through the Captain Cook RSL Day Care Club. | |
| Geoffrey Robert Lund | For service to the welfare of ex-service personnel and their families, particularly through the Incapacitated Servicemen and Women's Association. | |
| Leo Anthony Luton | For service to the community through a range of aged care, church, educational and social support groups. | |
| Mervyn Vincent Lynch | For service to local government, and to the community of the St George district through aged care, sporting and church groups. | |
| Albert Edward Lyon | For service to the communities of Barham and Wakool, particularly the welfare of ex-service personnel and their families. | |
| Maureen Denise McCabe | For service to community health as a hospital administrator and as a fundraiser for a range of charitable organisations. | |
| Adrian Douglas McClintock | For service to local government, to the community of Cooloola and to the Wesleyan Methodist Church. | |
| John Archibald MacDiarmid | For service to the community, particularly the Queanbeyan district, through ex-service and sporting groups, and to local government. | |
| Dr Michael John McGlynn | For service to medicine as a clinical plastic surgeon and teacher, and to the international community through Interplast Australia. | |
| William Hamish McGregor | For service to tertiary education, and to the community of Ballarat through a range of tourism, health, legal and arts organisations. | |
| Rowena Marion Mackean | For service to adult and community education in Tasmania through the University of the Third Age and other organisations. | |
| Anthony James "Tim" McKee | For service to the community of north Queensland through a range of sporting, charitable, service and youth training organisations. | |
| Colin MacKay MacKenzie QFSM | For service to the community, particularly as an entertainer for residents of aged care facilities. | |
| John Charles MacKenzie | For service to the community, particularly through the Eumungerie-Coboco Sub-Branch of the Returned and Services League of Australia. | |
| Valerie MacKenzie | For service to the community as an entertainer for residents of aged care facilities. | |
| Sister Monica Nita McNamara | For service to people with intellectual disabilities as a spiritual educator through the Special Religious Development Ministry of the Catholic Church. | |
| Megan Alice McNicholl | For service to education as an advocate for improved services in rural and remote areas, and to the community by raising public awareness of issues affecting women. | |
| Enid "Anne" Macarthur | For service to the community, particularly through the Australian Red Cross. | |
| Edward George "Ted" Macauley | For service to the community of Temora, particularly through the Returned and Services League of Australia, and to local government. | |
| Shirley Margaret Macindoe | For service to the international community through the establishment of and continued support for the Grace Ministries Overseas Aid. | |
| Brian Joseph Madden | For service to the community through the recording and preservation of local history and as an executive and member of a range of historical societies. | |
| Thomas Harvey Maddern | For service to Rugby Union football as a referee and through a range of administrative roles. | |
| Ronald James Magrath AFC | For service to aviation in Australia as a pilot, instructor and contributor to a range of industry bodies. | |
| Dr Peter Joseph Malouf | For service to medicine, particularly as a physician to a range of sporting and recreational organisations. | |
| Stan Marks | For service to the Jewish community of Victoria through the Jewish Holocaust Museum and Research Centre, and to journalism. | |
| Gavin Derry Marschke | For service to cricket, particularly through the Sunshine Coast Cricket Association, as an umpire, coach, player and administrator. | |
| Janette Audree Maskill | For service to the community, particularly through the United Hospital Auxiliaries of New South Wales. | |
| Neita Matthews | For service to netball, and to athletes with a disability as a contributor to the establishment of competitions and facilities. | |
| Vera Katherine Matthews | For service to the community as Coordinator of the Brighton Church of Christ Community Care Centre. | |
| The Reverend Canon Bruce Edward Maughan RFD | For service to education through a range of administrative roles and as a teacher, and to the Anglican Church of Australia. | |
| Dr Jillian Fiona Maxwell | For service to the medical profession through a range of medical insurance and general practice organisations, and to the community. | |
| Stanley George Miller | For service to athletics through a range of administrative and coaching roles. | |
| Terrence Wayne "Terry" Miller | For service to the community through the Asbestos Victims Association of South Australia. | |
| Kathleen Milligan | For service to the ex-service community, particularly through the South Australian Branch of the Returned and Services League of Australia. | |
| Robert Millward | For service to Rugby League football through a range of executive roles at national, state and regional levels. | |
| Virginia Mary Mitchell | For service to the community as a remote area health nurse. | |
| Geoffrey William Mitchelmore | For service to the community of Hobsons Bay, particularly through the establishment of environmental and performing arts projects. | |
| Dr Warner Mooney | For service to medicine in the field of otolaryngology, particularly paediatric otolaryngology, as a surgeon and hospital administrator. | |
| Professor Robert Geoffrey Moses | For service to medicine in the field of endocrinology, particularly in the area of gestational diabetes research. | |
| Dr Lesley Anne Muir | For service to recording and preserving local history, particularly in the Canterbury District. | |
| Margaret Allason Muirhead | For service to youth through the Guiding movement, and to the community through health, social support, aged care and service groups. | |
| Shirley Hessell Mullane | For service to the ex-service community, particularly through the Returned and Services League of Australia. | |
| Mary Essington Munckton | For service to the community of the Seymour district as a supporter of rural show, civic and service groups. | |
| Anne Elizabeth Murray | For service to the community, particularly through counselling and victim support organisations. | |
| Dr John Weir Murray | For service to the greyhound racing industry as a veterinarian and through industry organisations. | |
| Enid Dorothy Natoli | For service to the community, particularly as a volunteer providing support and counselling to prison inmates and their families. | |
| Eugean Kathleen "Judy" Navin | For service to the community of the City of Willoughby through aged care and service groups, and to local government. | |
| John Robert Nelson | For service to the community of Boort, particularly in the area of water supply and management. | |
| Joycelyn Elizabeth "Topsy" Nevett | For service to the community of the Ballarat region through rural show, health and church organisations, and to local government. | |
| Simon Harvey Newcomb | For service to the sport of rowing in Queensland through administrative and coaching roles. | |
| Stephen Kai Fun Ng | For service to the community through activities fostering Australia-China relations, particularly in relation to student cultural exchanges. | |
| Thuat Van Nguyen | For service to the community, particularly to young people through the Vietnamese scouting movement, and as the organiser of a major annual multicultural children's festival. | |
| Valma Frances "Val" Nicholas | For service to people with visual impairments through the Canberra Blind Society, and to the community through organisations raising awareness of issues affecting women. | |
| Philip Edmond Nolan | For service to the community of Wangaratta through roles in economic development, school and sporting organisations, and to the print media. | |
| Glenn Richard Norris | For service to mental health nursing, particularly in Indigenous communities. | |
| The Reverend Father Timothy Norris | For service to the community of Geebung, particularly through the Catholic Church. | |
| Barry James Oates | For service to the dairy industry, and to water resource and catchment management. | |
| John Edward O'Connor | For service to Australian Rules football as a coach, manager and trainer at secondary school level. | |
| Dr Denis Anthony "Tony" O'Malley | For service to the community of South Australia, particularly as a contributor to the evaluation of economic, social and environmental trends in the state. | |
| Geraldine Margaret O'Malley | For service to the community of Warwick through financial, church, ex-service and educational organisations. | |
| David Troy Palmer | For service to the sport of squash, particularly as a competitor. | |
| George Ralph Papallo | For service to adult education and to the community of Ryde. | |
| Priscilla Park | For service to the environment through organisations involved with the conservation of Tasmanian shorebirds and wetlands areas. | |
| Bruce Raymond Patchell | For service to the community of Dandenong through business, service, cultural and ex-service organisations. | |
| Michael Francis Paterson | For service to people with disabilities through the South Coast AKtion Club and the Kiwanis Club of Reynella. | |
| Nicholas Patiniotis | For service to the Greek community through organisations providing assistance to elderly and infirm people. | |
| John Ronald Pearce | For service to athletics, particularly through the Enfield Harriers Athletics Club. | |
| Roger Franklyn Peffer | For service to the community, particularly through Baptist Community Services NSW & ACT, and to people with hearing impairment, particularly through Better Hearing Australia. | |
| Kevin John Pell | For service to the community of Nathalia through sporting, aged care and environmental organisations. | |
| Dr Joanne Llyndllbeth Penglase | For service to the community, particularly through the organisation Care Leavers of Australia Network. | |
| Omettege "Gamini" Perera | For service to the community, particularly through the Sri Lankan Study Centre for the Advancement of Technology and Social Welfare. | |
| Gloria Dawn Perrins | For service to ex-service personnel and their families through the Returned and Services League of Australia. | |
| Deirdre Elizabeth Perry | For service to the community through a range of church organisations involved with health and social welfare. | |
| Leslie John Perry | For service to the community of Mirboo through environmental and financial organisations, and to long distance running. | |
| John Samuel Pickering | For service to the community of Merrylands through the St Vincent de Paul Society and St Margaret Mary's Catholic Parish. | |
| Andrew Franklin Pike | For service to the film industry, particularly through the promotion of Australian, independent and foreign films, and to the community. | |
| Emeritus Professor Peter Leslie Pinson | For service to the visual arts as an educator, painter and writer, and through contributions to a range of arts organisations. | |
| Pamela Pisasale | For service to the community of Robinvale through the Robinvale Villers-Bretonneux Association and performing arts and welfare organisations, and to local government. | |
| Dr John Walter Plant | For service to veterinary science and to the Australian sheep industry, particularly in the area of disease control. | |
| Rayelene Gwennyth Plummer | For service to veterans and their families through the Woolgoolga Sub-Branch of the Returned and Services League of Australia. | |
| Mary Catherine Polack | For service to pharmacy through the Tasmanian Branch of the Pharmaceutical Society of Australia and a range of health-related organisations. | |
| Alan Sinclair Pollock | For service to lawn bowls through the Royal New South Wales Bowling Association. | |
| George Pomeroy | For service to the Manly-Warringah community, particularly through ex-service organisations. | |
| William Joseph Potten | For service to the welfare of ex-service personnel and their families, particularly through The Entrance-Long Jetty Sub-Branch of the Returned and Services League of Australia. | |
| Robin Bernice Potter | For service to the community as a volunteer with and supporter of a range of charitable, sporting and performing arts organisations. | |
| Peter Thomas Power | For service to the community as a magistrate, particularly through developing improved case management procedures and training programs for bail justices, and raising public awareness of court processes. | |
| Allan Leslie Quartermaine | For service to the community of the Sunshine Coast through ex-service organisations and the Buderim Bowls Club. | |
| Josephine Mary Quinn | For service to the community of Clemton Park through St Bernadette's Catholic Parish. | |
| Malcolm Clive Randall | For service to the community of Campbelltown through ex-service, youth and sporting organisations. | |
| Antony Edward Ranson | For service to business as a stockbroker, accountant and company director, and to the community through health and social welfare organisations. | |
| Sadie Edith Rathbone | For service to youth in juvenile detention, and to the community through church and social welfare organisations. | |
| David Rattray | For service to youth through the Scouting movement. | |
| Horace Richard "Dick" Dawson | For service to the community of Bogan Gate through a range of civic, sporting, church and rural fire service organisations. | |
| Gary Ernest Raymond APM | For service to the community through providing training in the area of critical incident stress management. | |
| Dr John Reddish | For service to the community through Rotary International, particularly in the development and provision of humanitarian aid programs. | |
| Kevin George Renwick | For service to the building industry, particularly through the development of small business opportunities, and to the community. | |
| Harold Eric Richards | For service to the community of the Sunshine Coast, particularly through ex-service, civic, church and sporting organisations. | |
| Lieutenant Colonel James William Richardson RFD, ED (Retired) | For service to the community of Fremantle, particularly through the Fremantle Local Drug Action Group. | |
| Lance Ronald Rigney | For service to the community, particularly through contributions in the ex-service sector. | |
| Dr Donald Christopher Rivett | For service to medicine through professional organisations in the area of rural and remote medicine, and as a general practitioner in the Batemans Bay area. | |
| Geoffrey John Robb | For achievements in mountaineering and as a fundraiser for charitable organisations. | |
| Peter "Jason" Ronald | For service to the community through a range of social welfare, cultural, political and agricultural organisations. | |
| Noelene June Roose | For service to the community, particularly through the World Day of Prayer program. | |
| The Very Reverend Father Victor Akhnoukh Rophael | For service to the community of Melbourne, particularly through St Mark's Coptic Orthodox Church. | |
| The Reverend Gerald Joseph Rowlands | For service to the community through the Assemblies of God Church and as a contributor to fostering international ecumenical relations. | |
| Ada Jean Judd | For service to the community of Katamatite through a range of heritage, church, sporting and welfare organisations. | |
| Inspector Nathaniel Sproule Russell | For service to pipe band music as a Pipe Major, teacher and adjudicator. | |
| Nicholas Craig Safstrom | For service to heritage conservation, particularly through the National Trust of Victoria, and through urban design and landscape architecture. | |
| Allan Douglas "Doug" Sarah | For service to the development and promotion of small business in the Ballarat region, and to the community through cultural, tourism and service organisations. | |
| James Imlay Saunders | For service to the dairy industry, particularly through industry reform, and to agricultural education. | |
| George Savill | For service to the communities of Baulkham Hills and Parramatta as a fundraiser for and supporter of charitable organisations. | |
| Robert Huntly Scott† | For service to business and to the community of the Gold Coast, particularly through Rotary International. | |
| Desmomd John Shanahan | For service to local government in the Light region, and to the community through a range of agricultural, aged care, sporting and recreation organisations. | |
| The Honourable George Arthur Shaw | For service to the Tasmanian Parliament, and to the community through church, service, aged care and sporting organisations. | |
| William Leslie Shields | For service to the building industry, particularly in the areas of training and education, and to the thoroughbred horseracing industry. | |
| Algirdas Pranas Simkus | For service to the Lithuanian community through cultural, school and youth groups. | |
| Robert Nathan Simons | For service to the Jewish community, particularly in the field of education. | |
| Lynette Veronica Smart | For service to the community as a foster care provider and trainer, and through emergency services and women's organisations. | |
| Catherine Vera Smeal | For service to the community of Newcastle as a volunteer with aged care, health and welfare organisations, and to nursing. | |
| Barry George Smith | For service to education as a teacher, administrator and adviser, particularly in the Ballarat district, and to the community. | |
| John Phillip Smith | For service to the welfare of veterans and their families, particularly through the Vietnam Veterans Association of Australia. | |
| Keith Wilfred Smith | For service to the community, particularly through the Austin Research Institute, and through church organisations in the Ivanhoe area. | |
| Lois Elizabeth Smith | For service to the community of Robinvale through nursing. | |
| Peter Barrie Smith | For service to horticulture, particularly through the Australian Inland Botanic Gardens. | |
| Raymond Robert Smith | For service to the Institution of Surveyors, Victoria, to veterans and their families through the 3rd Australian Survey Company Association, and to the community. | |
| Norman "Norm" Sneath | For service to structural engineering, particularly through education and the development and integration of computer programs in design processes. | |
| Joel Albert Solomon | For service to the community through a range of health, charitable, seniors and religious organisations. | |
| Donald Richard Spencer | For service to children's music and television as a songwriter and performer, and through the establishment of the Australian Children's Music Foundation. | |
| John David Spencer RFD | For service to veterans and their families, particularly through the South Australian Branch of the Returned and Services League of Australia. | |
| Harold Samuel "Hal" Spiegel† | For service to the community through charitable activities with Lions Australia and support for homeless youth on Sydney's North Shore. | |
| Eve Matilda Stafford | For service to the community, particularly through support for regional arts and cultural development in far north Queensland. | |
| John Ralph Stanborough | For service to the community of Albury Wodonga, particularly to the welfare of veterans and their families. | |
| Zali Steggall | For service to alpine skiing, and to the community through support for a range of charitable groups. | |
| Jan Jelle Steinfurth | For service to the community through disability support, youth and church groups. | |
| John Trevor Stephenson | For service to vocational education and training in Victoria, and to the community of East Gippsland. | |
| Emeritus Professor Neville Charles Stephenson | For service to science education and communication, to chemistry, particularly through research into crystallography, and to the community. | |
| Neville Clyde Stewart | For service to science education and communication, to chemistry, particularly through research into crystallography, and to the community. | |
| Percival John "Val" Stone | For service to the community of Box Hill, particularly through church, aged care and service organisations. | |
| Francis Roy Sutherland | For service to the community of Moruya through a range of sporting and charitable organisations. | |
| Colonel Geoffrey Milroy Swan MBE, ED (Retired) | For service to youth through Lord Somers Camp and Power House, and to the welfare of veterans and their families. | |
| Dr John Douglas Tait | For service to the community of Mackay, particularly through aged care and educational organisations. | |
| Betty Rae Tasker | For service to the community of West Tamar through support for a range of civic, sporting, aged care and agricultural show organisations. | |
| Alexander Lawton Taylor | For service to the pork industry, to rural vocational education and training, and to the community through Rotary International. | |
| David John Thomas | For service to the community, particularly through contributions to a range of conservation, social welfare, cultural and arts organisations, and providing assistance to artisans and artists. | |
| James Herbert Thomas | For service to the community of Narrabri through a range of welfare, sporting, service and church organisations. | |
| The Reverend Rex "Malcolm" Thomas | For service to the Uniting Church in Australia, particularly through ministry and chaplaincy roles in outback areas, and as a supporter of welfare and service groups. | |
| John Raymond Thomas | For service to youth, particularly through the Child and Family Care Network, and to the community as a supporter of Neighbourhood Watch. | |
| Leonard John Thompson | For service to veterans, particularly through the 8th Battalion Royal Australian Regiment Association and the Sunshine Coast Sub-Branch of the Vietnam Veterans' Association of Australia. | |
| John Whyte "Ian" Thomson | For service to architecture in New South Wales, particularly through the design and development of government schools and significant public buildings and spaces, and to the community. | |
| Alexander Hugh "Alex" Tobin | For service to soccer, particularly as an international representative player and through the Australian Professional Footballers' Association. | |
| Brigadier Bruce Alan Trimble RFD (Retired) | For service to ex-service personnel and their families, particularly through the Vasey Housing Association New South Wales. | |
| Peter Hemsworth Troy | For service to surfing, particularly as a contributor to the establishment of the sport and as an historian, and to the surf lifesaving movement. | |
| David James Tulloch | For service to the community of the Gippsland region through a range of agricultural, print industry, church, service and educational organisations. | |
| Emeritus Professor Dennis Edgar Turner | For service to management education, and to the community through contributions to economic research and charitable organisations. | |
| Jessie Camilla Ussher† | For service to the Australian Red Cross and to the community of Wangaratta. | |
| John Edwin Vickery | For service to the wine industry as an oenologist, particularly through the development of innovative methods for riesling production. | |
| Vicki Vidor | For service to youth through the Lighthouse Foundation, and to the community as a supporter of a range of charitable organisations. | |
| Arthur Allanby "Allan" Viney | For service to the community through rural fire and service organisations, and to the New South Wales Parliament. | |
| Professor Donald Murray Walker | For service to oral pathology and oral medicine as an academic and clinician, and to public health through research and diagnostic services relating to oral and maxillofacial pathology. | |
| Helen Lesley Walker | For service to the community through the Australian Pompe's Association, and as a supporter of disability, aged care and church groups. | |
| Pamella Maunsell Wall | For service to the community through a range of disability support, veterans' welfare and charitable organisations. | |
| Ian Stuart Wallace | For service to the chestnut industry, and to the community of Porepunkah through a range of rural fire, church and service organisations. | |
| Harold Charles Walton | For service to rural communities in Western Australia through support for agricultural, welfare, historical and sporting organisations in the Carnamah region. | |
| Terrance Rowell Walton | For service to rural communities in Western Australia through support for agricultural, welfare, historical and sporting organisations in the Carnamah region. | |
| Brendan James Watson | For service to the Scouting movement, particularly as International Commissioner for Scouts Australia. | |
| Marie Wells | For service to the dental profession, particularly through the Dental Assistants' Association of Australia. | |
| Lionel Charles Whish-Wilson | For service to maritime safety as operator of Mersey Radio. | |
| Jessie Lorraine Whitehouse | For service to the community, particularly through the Ostomy Association of Western Australia. | |
| Associate Professor Kevin George Whithear | For service to veterinary science and education, particularly through research, development and production of vaccines to control major diseases in poultry. | |
| Brenton Mark Whittaker | For service to children through support for orphanages in South East Asia. | |
| Leonard Ross Whittenbury | For service to the community through ex-service, aged care, social welfare and sporting organisations. | |
| Raymond Eden Widdows | For service to veterans and their families, particularly through the New South Wales Branch of the Rats of Tobruk Association. | |
| Dorothy Ilma Williams | For service to the community of the Gold Coast, particularly the welfare of people with disabilities. | |
| Dr Gary Maurice Willmott | For service to education, particularly in the areas of curriculum and qualification assessment and development, and through promoting and expanding vocational education and training opportunities. | |
| Dr Brian Gilmore Wilson | For service to medicine in the field of ophthalmology as a researcher, clinician and teacher, and to the community. | |
| Ellen "Ruth" Wilson | For service to the community of Paynesville, particularly through support for the establishment of a local ambulance service and community bank. | |
| Robert William Wilson | For service to the Mallee region, particularly through recording and preserving local history. | |
| Peter Wood | For service to local government, to the Queensland Parliament, and to the community of Toowoomba, particularly through cultural organisations. | |
| Edna Beatrice Wright | For service to the community of the Atherton Tablelands through a range of musical, performing arts and church organisations. | |
| Dr Robert Sharp Wyburn | For service to veterinary science and education, particularly through professional organisations and in the field of radiology, and to the community of Margaret River. | |
| Joan Barbara Yet Foy | For service to pistol shooting as a judge, coach and administrative officer. | |
| Warren John York | For service to the co-operative movement and to the community of Mount Barker through a range of health, aged care, school and church organisations. | |
| Leslie Maurice "Les" Youie | For service to the community, particularly through a range of youth, service and Chinese cultural organisations. | |
| Thomas Gratton "Tim" Young | For service to the community of Unley, particularly through a range of veterans, welfare and charitable organisations. | |
| Nat "Natale" Zanardo | For service to the Italian community, particularly through the provision of aged care facilities, and as a supporter of charitable groups. | |
| Esad Zorlak | For service to the multicultural community, particularly through a range of Bosnian-Herzegovinian cultural organisations. | |

==== Military Division ====
| Branch | Recipient | Citation | Notes |
|---|---|---|---|
| Navy | Lieutenant Simon Andrew Coates RAN | For meritorious service over a number of years as the Ceremonial Coordinator for ACT and Southern NSW; Chief Boatswain HMAS TOBRUK; and Naval Officer Workforce Modeller within the Directorate of Workforce Modelling and Analysis. | |
| Navy | Warrant Officer Andrew John Freame | For meritorious service as Junior Officers Warfare Course Divisional Officer, Staff Officer for Boatswains Mate Category Sponsor, and President of the Senior Sailors’ Mess at HMAS WATSON. | |
| Navy | Chief Petty Officer Vincent Lee Rudge | For meritorious service as the Food Services Manager and Support Departmental Regulator in HMAS ARUNTA, and as Leadership Instructor at the Junior Sailors Leadership and Management Faculty – West. | |
| Navy | Chief Petty Officer Gary Lee Smith | For meritorious service as Chief Petty Officer Naval Reserve Diving Team Six, Williamstown, Victoria. | |
| Army | Warrant Officer Class One Michael David Johnson | For meritorious service as the Regimental Sergeant Major of the 1st/19th Battalion, The Royal New South Wales Regiment and the 1st Battalion, The Royal Australian Regiment. | |
| Army | Warrant Officer Class One Donald Garry Spinks | For meritorious service to the Royal Australian Armoured Corps and to the Multi-National Force and Observers – Sinai. | |
| Army | Warrant Officer Class One Barry Leslie Wade | For meritorious service as the Regimental Sergeant Major of the 3rd Combat Engineer Regiment and in other senior appointments as a soldier of the Royal Australian Engineers. | |
| Air Force | Group Captain Mark Anthony Kelton | For meritorious service in the field of combat support to Royal Australian Air Force air operations. | |
| Air Force | Group Captain Richard James Sargent MBE | For meritorious service in the field of acquisition and logistics support. | |

== Meritorious Service ==
=== Public Service Medal (PSM) ===
Public Service Medal ribbon

| State/ Territory | Recipient | Citation | Notes |
|---|---|---|---|
| Aust. | Sheila Margaret Bird | For outstanding public service in the development and implementation of reforms to child support policy and administration. | |
| Aust. | Neville John Bryan | For outstanding public service in the monitoring and review of the Australian intelligence community. | |
| Aust. | Ian Herbert Cousins | For outstanding public service in the delivery of Australia's security policy framework and critical infrastructure protection initiatives. | |
| Aust. | Gary Robert Dowling | For outstanding public service in the management of the Department of Defence's warehousing and maintenance outsourcing program at Puckapunyal. | |
| Aust. | Kym Francis Duggan | For outstanding public service in the development and implementation of major reforms to the family law system. | |
| Aust. | Terrence Leo Gallagher | For outstanding public service in the development and implementation of bankruptcy law reform. | |
| Aust. | Robert George Harvey | For outstanding public service in implementing reforms to the Community Development Employment Projects program for Indigenous Australians. | |
| Aust. | Dr Barry David Inglis | For outstanding public service in the field of measurement science, particularly his leadership role in the establishment of the National Measurement Institute. | |
| Aust. | Lynnita Mary Maddock | For outstanding public service to the communications sector, particularly in the regulation of telecommunications, broadcasting, radio communications and online content. | |
| Aust. | Mirah Nuryati | For outstanding public service in the development of collaborative agricultural research projects between Australia and Indonesia. | |
| Aust. | Robert William Peck | For outstanding public service in improving medication outcomes for the Australian veteran community. | |
| Aust. | Jan Louise Redfern | For outstanding public service in the field of corporate and financial services regulation and enforcement. | |
| Aust. | Roderick Richard Smith | For outstanding public service in leading Australia's consular service. | |
| Aust. | Dr Paul Anthony Taloni | For outstanding public service as Deputy Director of the Defence Intelligence Organisation. | |
| Aust. | Dr Roger Samuel Turner | For outstanding public service in leading significant cultural and operational changes in the Australian meat export industry. | |
| NSW | Jane Margaret Burrow | For outstanding public service in the provision of home care to the Western Plains community. | |
| NSW | Peter Noel Barry | For outstanding public service in the development and implementation of Government policies and strategies for consumer protection in strata schemes and residential parks. | |
| NSW | Roderick Charles Best | For outstanding public service in the provision of legal services within the New South Wales Department of Community Services. | |
| NSW | Neil Duncan Black | For outstanding public service to education in New South Wales. | |
| NSW | Elaine Gai Cunningham | For outstanding public service to education, particularly to the community of the Tweed River region. | |
| NSW | Allan Douglas Henderson | For outstanding public service to Sydney Water, particularly in the field of construction project management. | |
| NSW | Alastair Hamilton Howard | For outstanding public service to Forests New South Wales. | |
| NSW | Alan McCormack | For outstanding public service to the communities of Parkes and surrounding areas. | |
| NSW | John Francis Maher | For outstanding public service to the construction industry, in particular the development of the Sydney transport infrastructure. | |
| NSW | Thomas James Thorogood | For outstanding public service as a driver within the New South Wales Premier's Department. | |
| NSW | Richard Howard Wherritt | For outstanding public service, particularly in the field of construction project management. | |
| VIC | Christian Henry Barwick | For outstanding public service, particularly to young people within the Ararat community. | |
| VIC | Mark Duckworth | For outstanding public service to the development of the national counter-terrorism policy and response arrangements. | |
| VIC | Margaret Ruth Goding | For outstanding public service in the provision of public mental health to the Victoria community. | |
| VIC | Rodney Maxwell Gowans | For outstanding public service to the conservation of biodiversity and to the management of national parks. | |
| VIC | Ian Bruce Munro | For outstanding public service, particularly in the provision of an investment facilitation model and in the continued economic development of Victoria. | |
| VIC | James Edmond Pascal | For outstanding public service in the development and delivery of ‘English as a Second Language’ programs and refugee settlement in rural and regional Victoria. | |
| VIC | Douglas John Vickers | For outstanding public service, particularly to the Indigenous community and children with special needs. | |
| QLD | Colin Francis Black | For outstanding public service in the field of public housing. | |
| QLD | Christopher David Blanch | For outstanding public service to the towns and communities of western Queensland. | |
| QLD | Colin John Hegarty | For outstanding public service in the field of ICT procurement and contracting. | |
| QLD | Burton Frank Johnson | For outstanding public service in the field of civil construction and commitment to the environment. | |
| QLD | Peter John Neville | For outstanding public service and contribution to primary industries, especially fisheries. | |
| QLD | Dr Anthony John Pressland | For outstanding public service in the field of sustainable management of natural resources in Queensland. | |
| QLD | Dr John Purvis Thompson | For outstanding public service in the field of agricultural research and contribution to the grain industry. | |
| WA | Robert John Delane | For outstanding public service to the agriculture industries and the community of Western Australia. | |
| WA | Michael David Wallwork | For outstanding public service, particularly in the development of the road network within Western Australia. | |
| SA | Martin Breuker | For outstanding public service, particularly to the Eyre Peninsula community. | |
| SA | Martin Leslie Charman | For outstanding public service, particularly for his contribution to the development of emergency management arrangements for the Eyre Peninsula. | |
| SA | Roger Barrington Wickes | For outstanding public service, particularly for his contribution in the field of natural resource management. | |
| ACT | Suzanne Marie "Sue" Ryan | For outstanding public service, particularly to the younger community in the Australian Capital Territory. | |
| NT | John Leonard Baskerville | For outstanding public service to the Central Australian community. | |
| NT | Rose Siew Kim Rhodes | For outstanding public service within the Department of Health and Community Services, Northern Territory. | |

=== Australian Fire Service Medal (AFSM) ===
Australian Fire Service Medal ribbon

| State/ Territory | Recipient | Notes |
|---|---|---|
| NSW | Trevor James Anderson PSM | |
| NSW | Ronald "John" Ashton OAM | |
| NSW | Superintendent Kim Daryl Baker | |
| NSW | Chief Superintendent Michael John "Mick" Beltran | |
| NSW | Keith David Ferguson | |
| NSW | Superintendent Michael Stanley Guymer | |
| NSW | John Edwin Harvey | |
| NSW | Donald Luscombe | |
| NSW | Captain Raymond Joseph McTiernan | |
| NSW | Leslie Graham Stewart | |
| VIC | Chief Fire Officer Gregory Robert Allisey | |
| VIC | Edwin "Frank" Colverson | |
| VIC | John Michael Dodemaide | |
| VIC | Terence Francis Hedt | |
| VIC | Acting Assistant Chief Fire Officer Peter Robert Holmes | |
| VIC | Dennis William Matthews | |
| VIC | Rainer Malcolm Reinbold | |
| VIC | Nicholas Patrick Ryan | |
| QLD | Paul William Adcock | |
| QLD | Leonard Alan Jeavous | |
| QLD | Gary Bruce Littlewood | |
| QLD | Graeme Douglas Thom | |
| WA | Edmond Leo "Eddy" Brooks | |
| WA | Phillip Mark Cribb | |
| WA | Terrence Gordon Hunter | |
| SA | Euan Arthur Ferguson | |
| SA | Robin George Holmes | |
| SA | Grant Nigel Lupton | |
| TAS | Damien John Killalea | |
| TAS | Shirley Ann Meers | |
| TAS | David Roy Stott | |
| ACT | Chief Officer David Laurence Prince | |

=== Ambulance Service Medal (ASM) ===
Ambulance Service Medal ribbon

| State/ Territory | Recipient | Notes |
|---|---|---|
| VIC | Neil Ronald Burden | |
| VIC | Geoffrey Keith Harvey | |
| VIC | Keith Herring | |
| VIC | Paul Francis Holman | |
| VIC | Colin John Horwell | |
| QLD | Rodney James Muller | |
| QLD | Gregory Paul Skerman | |
| WA | David Joseph Cloughley | |
| WA | Thomas Robson | |
| WA | Charles John Shepherd | |
| SA | Graham Keith Denton | |
| SA | Keith Roland Gregurke | |

=== Emergency Services Medal (ESM) ===
Emergency Services Medal ribbon

| State/ Territory | Recipient | Notes |
|---|---|---|
| NSW | Graeme Charles Craig | |
| NSW | Grace Marjorie Matts | |
| NSW | Craig James Ronan | |
| NSW | Kim Salton | |
| NSW | Steven Garry Stranks | |
| NSW | Wilfred "John" Thompson | |
| VIC | Gayle Maree Hughes | |
| VIC | Murray Vincent Kelson | |
| QLD | Graeme Andrew Cheal BM | |
| QLD | Wayne Douglas Coutts | |
| QLD | Douglas William Lander | |
| QLD | Peter John Smith | |
| WA | Keith Irwin Shadbolt | |
| WA | Joyce Mary White | |
| SA | Roger Kenneth Murdoch | |
| TAS | Paul Sidney Darby | |
| TAS | Claus Wilkens | |
| ACT | Graham Gary Ible | |

== Gallantry, Distinguished and Conspicuous Service ==
=== Distinguished Service Cross (DSC) ===
Distinguished Service Cross ribbon

| Branch | Recipient | Citation | Notes |
|---|---|---|---|
| Navy | Commodore Geoffrey Alan Ledger AM, RAN | For distinguished command and leadership in action in the Middle East Area of Operations as the Commander Joint Task Force 633 during Operations CATALYST and SLIPPER. | |
| Army | Lieutenant Colonel James Francis McMahon DSM | For distinguished command and leadership in action as commander of the Special Operations Task Element during Operation SLATE and as commander of the Special Operations Task Group during Operation SLIPPER. | |

=== Commendation for Distinguished Service ===
Commendation for Distinguished Service ribbon

| Branch | Recipient | Citation | Notes |
|---|---|---|---|
| Army | Christopher Robert Caspani | For distinguished service as an infantry section commander of the Australian Security Detachment VIII, Baghdad. | |
| Army | Colonel Peter Alun Davies | For distinguished service on operations as the Chief of Staff within Headquarters Joint Task Force 633 during Operation CATALYST. | |
| Army | Major Mark Edward Fletcher | For distinguished service as Operations Officer for Al Muthanna Task Group Two as part of Operation CATALYST, Iraq. | |
| Army | Warrant Officer Class Two Michael Fuerste | For distinguished service as the Transport Supervisor to the Special Operations Task Unit 637.1 during Operation SLIPPER, Afghanistan. | |
| Army | Major Martin William Graves | For distinguished service in the performance of medical duties as a member of Special Operations Task Unit 637.1 during Operation SLIPPER, Afghanistan 2005. | |
| Army | Lieutenant Colonel Steven Andrew Summersby | For distinguished service during Operation CATALYST as the Executive Officer to the Deputy Chief of Staff Strategic Operations, Multi-National Force – Iraq. | |
| Army | Lieutenant John Brendon Taylor | For distinguished service on operations as an Infantry Platoon Commander of the Australian Security Detachment VIII in Baghdad. | |
| Army | Corporal Gary James Wheeler | For distinguished service as the sniper Team Leader of the Australian Security Detachment VIII Baghdad. | |
| Air Force | Air Commodore Richard David Owen | For distinguished performance of duty as Chief of Staff Headquarters Joint Task Force 633 on Operation CATALYST during the period October 2005 to April 2006. | |
| Air Force | Air Commodore Mark Alan Skidmore | For distinguished performance of duties in warlike operations as the Director of the Coalition Combined Air Operations Centre in the Middle East Area of Operations during Operations CATALYST and SLIPPER. | |

=== Conspicuous Service Cross (CSC) ===
Conspicuous Service Cross ribbon

| Branch | Recipient | Citation | Notes |
|---|---|---|---|
| Navy | Vincenzo Emilio Di Pietro RAN | For outstanding achievement as Director General Navy Certification Safety and Acceptance. | |
| Navy | Commander Lee John Goddard RAN | For outstanding achievement as Commander Operations in the Maritime Component, Joint Operations Command. | |
| Navy | Captain Adam Lloyd Grunsell RAN | For outstanding achievement as the Director General Navy Communications and Coordination, Navy Headquarters. | |
| Navy | Captain Peter Michael Quinn RAN | For outstanding achievement as the Commanding Officer of HMAS SYDNEY. | |
| Navy | Petty Officer Benjamin John Robson | For outstanding achievement as the Guided Missile Launcher System Course Implementation Officer at the Combat Systems Maintenance School. | |
| Army | Colonel Michael Herbert Annett | For outstanding achievement as the Deputy Command and Chief of Staff, Joint Task Force 636 for Operation ACOLYTE. | |
| Army | Brigadier Christopher George Appleton | For outstanding achievement as a Company Commander, Director of Military Art and Commandant of the Royal Military College of Australia. | |
| Army | Lieutenant Colonel Jason Peter Blain | For outstanding achievement as a Career Adviser at the Directorate of Officer Career Management – Army. | |
| Army | Lieutenant Colonel Bernadette Carmel Boss | For outstanding achievement as Commanding Officer, Sydney University Regiment. | |
| Army | Captain Benjamin David Passmore | For outstanding achievement as the Regimental Technical Adjutant of the 2nd Cavalry Regiment. | |
| Army | Lieutenant Colonel Bernard Aiden Richards | For outstanding achievement as Staff Officer Combat (Heavy) and Deputy Director Combat, Land Development Branch, Capability Systems Division, Capability Development Group. | |
| Air Force | Squadron Leader Kevin John Beauline | For outstanding achievement as Staff Officer Maritime Patrol and Response. | |
| Air Force | Group Captain Graham George Bond | For outstanding achievement as the Staff Officer for Protocol, Air Force. | |
| Air Force | Air Vice Marshal Christopher Lawrence Deeble AM | For outstanding achievement as Director General Aerospace Development, Capability Systems Division, Capability Development Group. | |
| Air Force | Squadron Leader Ruth Patricia Elsley | For outstanding achievement as the first Commander Australian Contingent for the Australian Defence Force's contribution to the United Nations Mission in Sudan. | |
| Air Force | Warrant Officer Stewart Michael Garth | For outstanding achievement as Manager Technical Analysis Section of the Joint Electronic Warfare Operational Support Unit. | |

=== Conspicuous Service Medal (CSM) ===
Conspicuous Service Medal ribbon

| Branch | Recipient | Citation | Notes |
|---|---|---|---|
| Navy | Commander John William Chandler RAN | For outstanding service as Acting Director of the COLLINS Class Submarine System Program Office. | |
| Navy | Commander Robert Alan Heffey RAN | For outstanding service as Minor War Vessel Operational Test Director, Royal Australian Navy Test, Evaluation and Analysis Authority in transitioning the ARMIDALE Class Patrol Boats into operational service. | |
| Navy | Leading Seaman Jamie Johnson | For outstanding service and performance of duty as the communications supervisor at Australian Clearance Diving Team One in support of operational capability. | |
| Navy | Lieutenant Commander Max Oliver Muller RAN | For outstanding service while employed in the Royal Australian Navy – United States Navy Personnel Exchange Program and deployed to Disaster Relief Operations in the aftermath of Hurricane Katrina. | |
| Army | Major Gary Roy Bergman | For outstanding service as Officer Commanding Development Group, Special Forces Training Centre in support of the development of Special Operations Command operational and training doctrine. | |
| Army | Warrant Officer Class Two Dean Neville Birse | For outstanding service as the Battery Commander's Assistant of the 101st Medium Battery, the 8th/12th Medium Regiment, in support of emerging technologies and operations. | |
| Army | Warrant Officer Class One John Donald Blake | For outstanding service as the Regimental Quartermaster of the 1st Armoured Regiment. | |
| Army | Major Robert Bruce Davis | For outstanding service as the Staff Officer Grade Two, Personnel and Logistics of the Forward Command Element, Joint Task Force 636 during Operation ACOLYTE. | |
| Army | Major Murray William Duckworth | For outstanding service as the Executive Officer, Security Task Group, Melbourne 2006 Commonwealth Games, and as Officer Commanding, 4th Brigade Reserve Response Force. | |
| Army | Captain Lyndon Kane Jackson | For outstanding service as the Quartermaster of the 1st Joint Support Unit. | |
| Army | Warrant Officer Class Two Ralph Michael Jaeger | For outstanding service in his performance of duties at the Parachute Training School. | |
| Army | Lieutenant Colonel Stephen Alan Moore | For outstanding service as Senior Instructor, Tactics Wing, School of Infantry. | |
| Army | Warrant Officer Class Two Shane David Niddrie | For outstanding service as the Company Sergeant Major, Charlie Company, the 3rd Battalion, The Royal Australian Regiment. | |
| Army | Warrant Officer Class One Michael Francis Wright | For outstanding service as the Technical Warrant Officer System Integration in the Personnel Information Management Section – Army. | |
| Air Force | Group Captain Peter David Brennan | For outstanding service as the Commander 1st Joint Movements Group. | |
| Air Force | Warrant Officer Bernard Paul Hayes | For outstanding service as a member of Project Air 5402 – Air to Air Refuelling Project. | |
| Air Force | Warrant Officer Anthony John Keogh | For outstanding service as a Flight Engineer at Number 11 Squadron, RAAF Base Edinburgh. | |
| Royal Air Force | Flight Lieutenant Carl Andrew Melen | For outstanding service as a Maritime Captain at Number 11 Squadron, RAAF Base Edinburgh. | |

=== Nursing Service Cross (NSC) ===
Nursing Service Cross ribbon

| Branch | Recipient | Citation | Notes |
|---|---|---|---|
| Army | Corporal Daniel Troy Davidson | For acts of exceptional dedication in the performance of nursing duties as a member of Special Operations Task Unit 637.1 during Operation SLIPPER, Afghanistan 2005. | |
| Army | Corporal McQuilty Quirke | For exceptional dedication in the performance of nursing duties as the Regimental Aid Post Corporal Medic, B Squadron, the 3rd/4th Cavalry Regiment. | |

=== Bar to the Nursing Service Cross ===
| Branch | Recipient | Citation | Notes |
|---|---|---|---|
| Army | Corporal Jonathan Aharon Walter NSC | For exceptional dedication in the performance of nursing duties as a member of Special Operations Task Unit 637.1 during Operation SLIPPER, Afghanistan 2005. | |

=== Meritorious Unit Citation (MUC) ===
| Branch | Recipient | Citation | Notes |
|---|---|---|---|
| ADF | Australian Medical Detachment - Balad | For sustained outstanding service and professional competency in the provision of health care in support of the United States Air Force Theatre Hospital, Balad, Iraq during Operation CATALYST from 1 September 2004 to 3 May 2005 inclusive and from 29 September 2005 to 31 December 2005 inclusive. | |
| Navy | HMAS Parramatta | For meritorious operational service in the Northern Arabian Gulf during Operation CATALYST from 1 November 2005 to 25 March 2006 while conducting maritime security operations in support of the Australian Government's contribution to the rehabilitation and rebuilding of Iraq. | |
