= Ian Johnston =

Ian Johnston may refer to:

- Ian Johnston (cricketer) (born 1948), former Irish cricketer
- Ian Johnston (doctor) (1930–2001), pioneer of reproductive medicine in Australia
- Ian Johnston (field hockey) (1929–2020), Canadian field hockey player
- Ian Johnston (police commissioner) (1952–2023), police and crime commissioner for Gwent Police
- Ian Johnston (police officer) (born 1945), former chief constable of British Transport Police
- Ian Johnston (rowing) (1947–2018), Australian Olympic rower
- Ian Johnston (rugby league) (1927–2013), Australian rugby league footballer
- Ian Johnston (soccer), Australian footballer; see Australia national soccer team records and statistics
- Ian C. Johnston (born 1938), Canadian professor and translator of classical works
- Ian R. Johnston (born 1943), Australian human factors engineer and road safety advocate
- Ian Lawson Johnston, 2nd Baron Luke (1905–1996), British peer, businessman and philanthropist

== See also ==
- Iain Johnstone (1943–2023), British film critic
- Iain M. Johnstone, statistician
- Ian Johnstone (disambiguation)
- Ian Johnson (disambiguation)
