= Ackermann =

Ackermann may also refer to the following:

- Ackermann (surname), for many people with this name
- Several mathematical objects named after Wilhelm Ackermann
  - Ackermann coding
  - Ackermann function
  - Ackermann ordinal
  - Ackermann set theory
- Ackermann steering geometry, in mechanical engineering
- Ackermann's formula, in control engineering
- Der Ackermann aus Böhmen, or "The Ploughman from Bohemia", a work of poetry in Early New High German by Johannes von Tepl, written around 1401
- Ackermannviridae, virus family named in honor of H.-W. Ackermann

== See also ==
- Ackerman (disambiguation)
- Ackermans (disambiguation)
- Akkerman (disambiguation)
- Åkerman
