= Ian Johnstone =

Ian Johnstone may refer to:

- Ian Johnstone (footballer)
- Ian Johnstone (broadcaster)

== See also ==
- Ian Johnston (disambiguation)
- Iain Johnstone, film critic
- Iain M. Johnstone, statistician
