= Akkerman (surname) =

Akkerman or Akkermans is a Dutch surname meaning "man from/working on the field", "farmer". Notable people with the surname include:

- Jan Akkerman (born 1946), Dutch musician and composer
- Peter Akkermans (born 1957), Dutch archaeologist and professor
- Piet Akkermans (1942–2002), former rector of the College of Europe
- Anton Dirk Louis Akkermans (1940–2006), microbiologist who contributed to microbial ecology
- Doreen Akkerman (born 1940), prominent member of cancer research. set up cancer information services in Australia, Canada and Singapore. Was honored with an Order of Australia. Inaugural president of the International Cancer Information and Support Service
