= Ian Johnson =

Ian Johnson may refer to:

- Ian Johnson (cricketer) (1917–1998), Australian Test cricket captain
- Ian Johnson (businessman) (1949–2019), managing director of the Seven Network
- Ian Johnson (writer) (born 1962), Beijing-based writer and journalist
- Ian Johnson (footballer, born 1960), English football defender
- Ian Johnson (footballer, born 1975), English football winger
- Ian Johnson (footballer, born 1983), English football midfielder
- Ian Johnson (American football) (born 1985), running back
- Ian Johnson, a character in the 2013 British TV series Utopia
- Ian Johnson (publicist), public relations manager based in London
- Ian Johnson, British economist in GLOBE
- Ian Johnson (water polo) (1925–2001), British Olympic water polo player

== See also ==
- Ian Johnston (disambiguation)
