= Frank Vincent (judge) =

Judge of the Supreme Court of Victoria

The Honourable Frank Hollis Rivers Vincent AO, KC
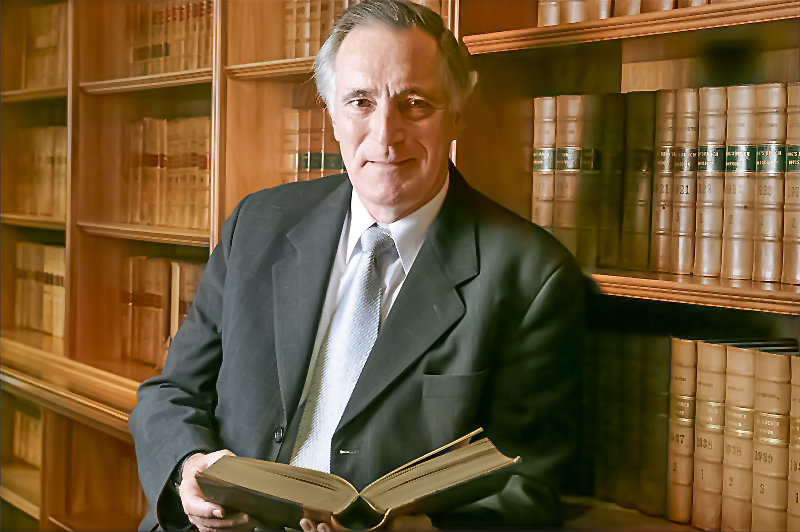
- Vincent

Judge of the Supreme Court of Victoria
- In office 30 April 1985 – 20 August 2009

Personal details
- Born: 3 October 1937 (age 88)
- Spouse: Dawn (née Eustace)
- Education: Melbourne University
- Profession: Judge

Frank Hollis Rivers Vincent AO KC (born 3 October 1937) is a retired Australian jurist, who was a Court of Appeals justice at the Supreme Court of Victoria from 2001 to 2009.

He obtaining a Bachelor of Laws from the Melbourne University Law School.

He was appointed Judge of the Supreme Court of Victoria on 30 April 1985, and elevated to the Court of Appeals in 2001. From 2001 to 2009, he was also Chancellor of Victoria University in Melbourne. Vincent retired from the Court on 20 August 2009.

In the 2007 Australia Day Honours he was appointed Order of Australia - General Division “for service to the judiciary and the law as a contributor to the reform of penal and parole systems, the rehabilitation of offenders, and Indigenous Australians involved with the criminal justice system; and to education as Chancellor of Victoria University, including efforts to increase educational opportunities for disadvantaged youth.”

Since 2012, Vincent has been a commissioner on the Victorian Law Reform Commission.

He is married to Dawn (née Eustace), and they have two daughters.

Academic offices
Preceded by Peter Laver	Chancellor of Victoria University; 2001–2009	Succeeded by George Pappas
