= Ackermans (disambiguation) =

Ackermans is a retail store based in South Africa.

Ackermans may also refer to:

- Stan Ackermans (1936–1995), Dutch mathematician
- Ackermans & van Haaren, Belgian holding company

== See also ==
- Ackerman (disambiguation)
- Ackermann (disambiguation)
- Akkerman (disambiguation)
