= Johan Henrik Åkerman =

Swedish economist

Johan Henrik Åkerman (31 March 1896 in Stockholm – July 12, 1982) was a Swedish economist and was a Professor of Economics and Statistics at Lund University. He was the younger brother of Swedish economist Johan Gustav Åkerman.

He got an MBA at Stockholm School of Economics 1918. He then studied at Harvard University 1919-20, and again in Sweden, he studied among other statistics in the Universities in Uppsala and Lund. He became PhD in 1929 with a thesis about the economic life rhythm which was the first Swedish dissertation that contained elements of econometrics.

"Åkerman's dissertation, on Rhythmics of Economic Life, announced his life-long interest in business cycle theory .There was, in his view, a strict synchronization between short and long cycles. Åkerman's attempts to formulate a theory would involve incorporating a prescient concern with an endogenous business cycle theory reliant in part upon seasonal cycles which, he argued, were correlated with and could propagate large and longer economic swings. Åkerman's "causal association" (1931) theory is a precedent to very recent work on seasonal cycles. Åkerman was also the first to identify the "political business cycle" (1947),. Åkerman also pursued more expansive work In his two monumental volumes on economic theory (1939, 1944), he attempts a sweeping theory of historical and structural change and how that, in turn, determines specific economic phenomena. This made him quite critical of the pure theory and the cavalier aggregation methods".

== Works ==
- A Swedish Index of Economic Cycles, 1922.
- Rhythmics of Economic Life, 1928.
- "Problems of American Monetary Policy", 1928, Ekon Tidsk.
- Economic Progress and Economic Crises, 1931.
- Some Lessons of the World Depression, 1931.
- "Dynamic Problems of Value", 1931 ZfN.
- "Quantitative Economics", 1932, WWA.
- Det ekonomiska läget, 1928-1932.
- Economic Forecast and Reality, 1928-1932.
- "Knut Wicksell: A pioneer of econometrics", 1933, Econometrica.
- Konjukturteoretsika Problem, 1934.
- "Annual Survey of Economic Theory: The setting of the central problem", 1936, Econometrica.
- Problem der Sozialokonomischen Synthese, 1938.
- Ekonomisk Teori, 2 volumes, 1939-1944.
- "Ekonomisk kalkyl och kausalanalys", 1944, Ekon Tidsk.
- Ekonomist skeende och politiska förändringar, 1946.
- "Political Economic Cycles", 1947, Kyklos
- "Ekonomi och politik. Ekonomiska konjunktur och politska val i USA 1868-1944", 1947, Ekon Tidsk
- "Summeringsproblemet modellfölopp och konjukturproblem", 1953, Ekon Tidsk.
- Politik och Ekonomi i Atomalderns Värld, 1954.
- Structures et Cycles Economiques, 1955-7.
- "De Ekonomiska beluslutens Katalysatorer", 1956, Ekon Tidsk.
- Theory of Industrialism, 1960.
- Internationell politik och samhällsekonomi, 1970.

== Sources ==
- Lars Pålsson Syll (1997). Den Strukturanalytiska Traditionen: En Studie I Ekonomisk Teori – Och Metodutveckling I Sverige (The Structure Analytic Tradition: A Study in Economic Theory and Method Development In Sweden) (in Swedish). Studentlitteratur. ISBN 9789144003597
- Åkerman, Johan i Vem är det 1977
- Erik Dahmén: Johan Åkerman i Ekonomporträtt. Svenska ekonomer under 300 år, SNS förlag, 1990 http://www.nek.lu.se/media/nek/historik/hist_akerman.pdf
- Johan Åkerman, (1928). Om det ekonomiska livets rytmik. Stockholm. Libris 911489
- Nationalekonomin i Sverige under 100 år, Ekonomisk Debatt 2000, nr 1, s. 63
- New School - Gustav Åkerman, 1888-1959.
