= Ackerman, West Virginia =

Unincorporated community in West Virginia, United States

Ackerman
- Unincorporated community
- Location within the state of West Virginia Ackerman (the United States)
- Coordinates: 39°35′08″N 78°49′14″W
- Country: United States
- State: West Virginia
- County: Mineral
- Elevation: 653 ft (199 m)
- Time zone: UTC-5 (Eastern (EST))
  - Summer (DST): UTC-4 (EDT)
- GNIS ID: 1717838

Ackerman was an unincorporated community in Mineral County, West Virginia, United States. Ackerman was located along a former branch line of the Western Maryland Railway in the North Branch Potomac River valley to the west of Knobly Mountain and to the east of Cresaptown, Maryland.
