= Ackerman syndrome =

- Other names: Pyramidal molar-glaucoma-upper abnormal lip syndrome, interstitial granulomatous dermatitis with arthritis (IGDA)
- Ackerman syndrome is inherited in an autosomal recessive manner
- Frequency: 0.0001%

Ackerman syndrome or interstitial granulomatous dermatitis is a familial syndrome of fused molar roots with a single canal (taurodontism), hypotrichosis, full upper lip without a cupid's bow, thickened and wide philtrum, and occasional juvenile glaucoma. It was described by James L. Ackerman, A. Leon Ackerman, and A. Bernard Ackerman.

== Signs and symptoms ==
- Fused molar roots
- Single root canal
- Juvenile glaucoma
- Sparse body hair
- Distinct facial features: full upper lip, absence of cupid's bow, thick philtrum
- Syndactyly
- Increased pigmentation of finger joints
- Clinodactyly of fifth finger.
