= Mariano Akerman =

Argentine painter, architect and art historian

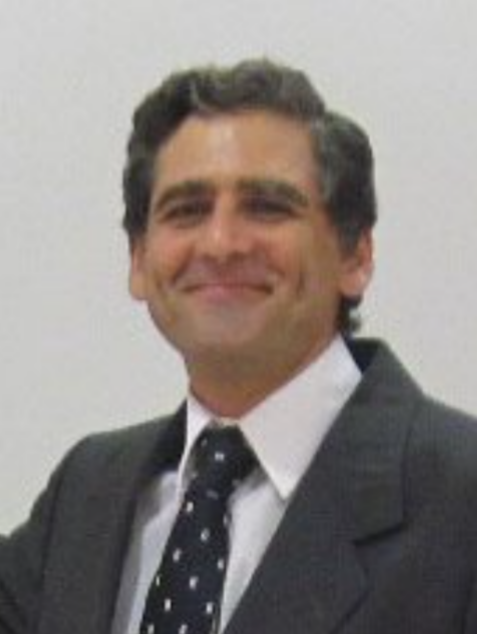
Akerman photographed in 2011

Mariano Akerman (Buenos Aires, 1963) is an Argentine painter, architect and art historian. Working as a researcher and a lecturer, Akerman also develops educational activities that encourage free expression and communitarian involvement of participants while considering their cultural background.

== Life and education ==
Akerman studied at the School of Architecture of Universidad de Belgrano (Argentina), completing his formation in 1987.

In 1995 he received a British Council Grant to research the artwork of Francis Bacon at Marlborough Fine Art and the Tate Gallery in London.

== Career ==
In Asia, Mariano Akerman developed the educational series of conferences The Belgian Contribution to the Visual Arts (2005), In the Spirit of Linnaeus (2007), Discovering Belgian Art (2008-9), Raisons d’être: Art, Freedom and Modernity (2010), German Art (2010), and The Gestalt Educational Program (2011).

In the American continent, the series of lectures Art and Identity (2013) includes a conference devoted to Bacon's idiosyncratic imagery—"To be and not to be."

Specializing in Visual Communication, Akerman lectures on modern art at institutions such as the Museo Nacional de Bellas Artes in Buenos Aires, the National Museum of the Philippines in Manila, the Star of Hope School in Taytay, the National College of Arts in Lahore, the Quaid-i-Azam University in Islamabad, UNIRIO and the Pontifical Catholic University of Rio de Janeiro.

== Visual Imagery and Design ==
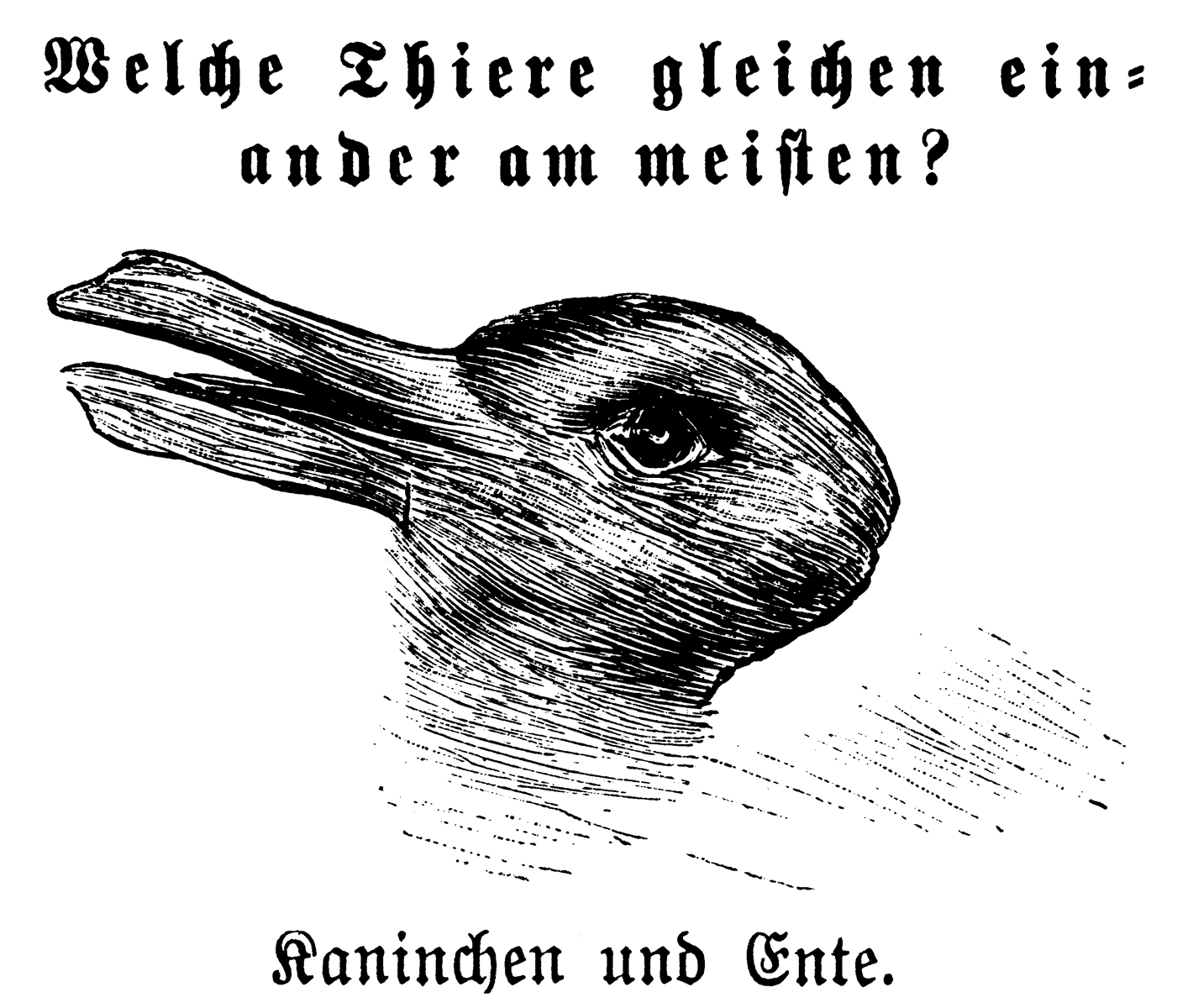
"Rabbit and Duck" from Fliegende Blätter (1892), an ambiguous image often used by Akerman to exemplify the both-and phenomenon in the visual arts.

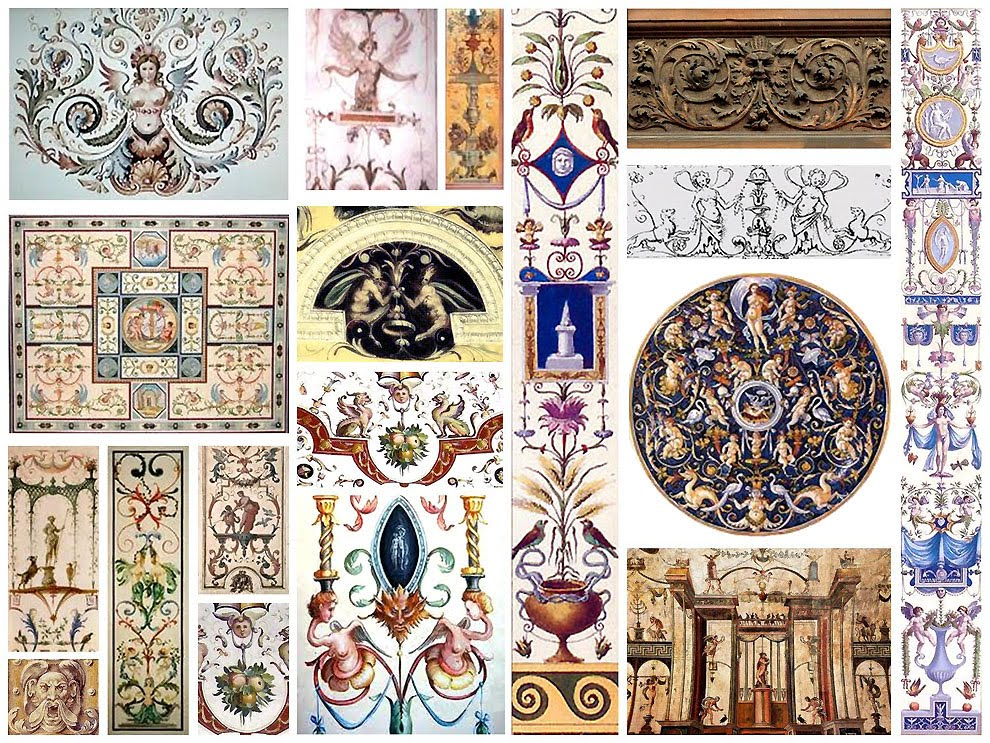
Renaissance Grotesques, digital composition.

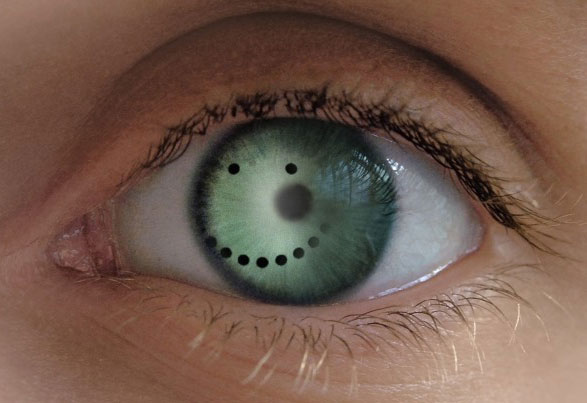
Gestalt in the Eye, digital montage

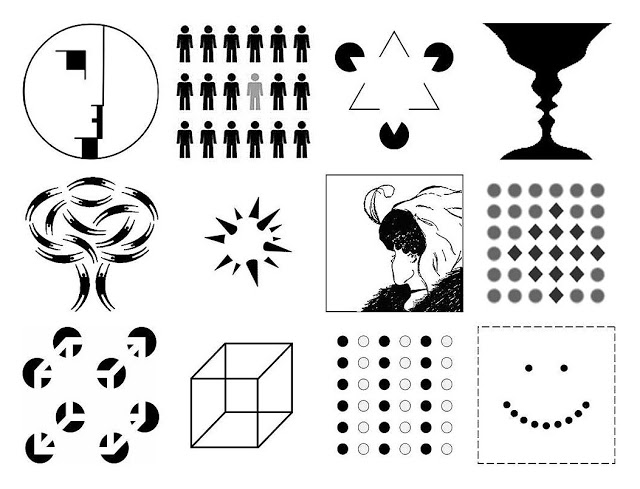
Gestalt Principles, digital composition

== Publications ==
- 1996. "The Evocative Character of Louis Kahn's Hurva Project."
- 1999. The Grotesque in Francis Bacon’s Paintings.
- 2012. "Bacon: Painter with a Double-Edged Sword."
- 2012. "A Passion for Hope through Imagination," in collaboration with Hannyia Abid.
