= Gustaf Åkerman =

Swedish economist (1888–1959)

- Born: 4 March 1888
- Died: 30 August 1959 (aged 71)
- Occupation: economist
- Known for: Professor of Political Economy, later University of Gothenburg
- Notable work: Realkapital und Kapitalzins: Heft I, Heft II.
- Relatives: Johan Henrik Åkerman (brother)
- Awards: member, Royal Society of Arts and Sciences in Gothenburg

Johan Gustaf Åkerman (4 March 1888 – 30 August 1959) was a Swedish economist who was Professor of Political Economy in what was to later become the University of Gothenburg.

He was the elder brother to Swedish economist Johan Henrik Åkerman. His work, in particular the Åkerman problem, played in an important role in the development of Wicksell's work on the role of capital. And was, according to Velupillai, one of the first to approach the problem of fixed capital as a joint product - work that was later developed by Piero Sraffa and John von Neumann

He was elected member of the Royal Society of Arts and Sciences in Gothenburg in 1938.

== Key works ==
- (1923) Realkapital und Kapitalzins: Heft I. Stockholm Centralryckeriet
- (1924) Realkapital und Kapitalzins: Heft II. Stockholm Centralryckeriet
