= Rachel Akerman =

Rachel Akerman (1522 – 1544) was an Austrian-Jewish poet.

The earliest Jewish woman to write German poetry; born probably at Vienna, 1522; died at Iglau, Moravia, 1544. She appears to have received an excellent education, having studied both Latin and Greek. She soon exhibited poetical powers, and began to exercise them at an early age.

On account of her poem, "Geheimniss des Hofes" ("The Mystery of the Courts"), in which she described the intrigues of courtiers, Rachel and her father were expelled from Vienna, where they had lived. She died in Iglau, Moravia, heartbroken.
