= Ian Knop =

Australian businessman (born 1949)

Ian Reginald Knop AM (born 28 April 1949) is an Australian businessman and chairman and managing director of Profile Ray & Berndtson, which is described as "an international executive search and management consulting firm". The firm was founded in 1976 by Knop. He is also Chairman of the Ray and Berndtson Asia Pacific Practice. He has been appointed as Chairman of the Sullivans Cove Waterfront Authority, a Tasmanian government advisory body. He is also the Chairman of the Sugar Research and Development Corporation, a position he was appointed to in October 2007.

In 2007 he was awarded an Order of Australia (AM) "For service to business, particularly to industry development in Tasmania, and to the community through a range of executive roles with energy, finance, sporting and Indigenous support organisations."

A biographical note states that he "holds a bachelor's degree in business from the Royal Melbourne Institute of Technology".

== Former affiliations ==
- Director, Austrade, May 2005 - May 2008;
- Director of Aurora Energy 16 May 2001 - ???;
- Chairperson of the Sydney Ports Corporation;
- Chairman of Soccer Australia;
- Canberra Cosmos FC;
- FIFA World Club Championship Organising Committee;
- Deputy Chairman of the Export Finance and Insurance Corporation - July 2005.
- Director, The Australian International Hotel School
- Director, Wilhelmsen Lines Australia.
