= Akkerman Inc. =

Akkerman Inc. is a construction equipment manufacturer producing microtunneling, sliplining, and guided boring trenchless products as well as pipe jacking and conventional tunnel boring machines.

It was founded in 1973, is based in Brownsdale, Minnesota, and as of 2024 employed approximately 100, growing from 60 in 2013. Akkerman develops tunnel boring equipment that can excavate tunnels up to 14 feet in diameter.

In 1995, Akkerman was the first U.S. manufacturer to build slurry microtunneling systems in the U.S., and subsequently earned Trenchless Technology’s 1998 New Installation Project of the Year.
