= Doreen Akkerman =

Australian cancer support worker

AM Anne Doreen Akkerman
- Occupation: Cancer support worker

Anne Doreen Akkerman AM is an Australian cancer support worker, best known for developing information and support services in oncological and palliative care.

== Career ==
Akkerman was Cancer Council Victoria's Director of Cancer Information and Support Services for twenty years from 1990 until 2010.

Throughout her career, Akkerman contributed to a number of published research papers, primarily relating to support services for cancer patients.

== Honours ==
In the 2007 Australia Day Honours, she was appointed as a Member of the Order of Australia "for service to the community through the establishment and development of information and support services in the areas of cancer and palliative care, and to the further education of health professionals, particularly breast care nurses".

Akkerman was added to the Victorian Honour Roll of Women in 2010.
