= Lucy Evelina Akerman =

American Unitarian writer

Lucy Evelina Akerman (née Metcalf; February 21, 1816 – February 21, 1874) was an American Unitarian writer.

This daughter of Thomas Metcalf was born in Wrentham, Massachusetts and married Charles Akerman of Portsmouth, New Hampshire. She also lived in Providence, Rhode Island.

She wrote the hymn "Nothing but Leaves, the Spirit Grieves" (circa 1858) that was chiefly used by the Baptists.

She died on her 58th birthday.
