= Åkerman =

Åkerman is a Swedish surname. Notable people with the surname include:

- Gustaf Åkerman (1888–1959), Swedish economist
- Gustav Åkerman (1901–1988), Swedish Army lieutenant general
- Johan Åkerman (born 1972), Swedish ice hockey player
- Johan Harmenberg Åkerman (born 1954), Swedish Olympic champion fencer
- Lisbeth Åkerman (born 1967), Swedish journalist
- Malin Åkerman (born 1978), Swedish-Canadian model and actress
