= Ian R. Johnston =

Ian Ronald Johnston AM (born 1943) is an Australian human factors engineer and road safety advocate. He is a fellow of the Australian Academy of Technological Sciences and Engineering.

Johnston was educated at the University of Melbourne. In 1991, he was appointed professor and director of the Monash University Accident Research Centre (MUARC) - the largest accident research centre in the Southern Hemisphere. Upon his retirement, he was praised by senior university and government figures as extremely influential in reducing road injuries in Victoria and worldwide. Johnston was appointed a Member of the Order of Australia in 2007 for service to the transport industry, particularly the promotion of road safety.

Prior to assuming his role at the MUARC, Johnston held a number of positions, including Director of Road Safety for the Government of Victoria under the John Cain II government.

== Works ==
- Johnston, I (1 October 2004). "Reducing injury from speed related road crashes". Injury Prevention. 10 (5): 257–259. doi:10.1136/ip.2004.006486. PMC 1730134. PMID 15470003.
- Johnston, Ian R. (6 July 2010). "The role of alcohol in road crashes". Ergonomics. 25 (10): 941–946. doi:10.1080/00140138208925054. PMID 7173155.
- Johnston, Ian (November 2010). "Beyond "best practice" road safety thinking and systems management – A case for culture change research". Safety Science. 48 (9): 1175–1181. doi:10.1016/j.ssci.2009.12.003.
- Johnston, Ian Ronald; Muir, Carlyn; Howard, Eric William (2013). Eliminating Serious Injury and Death from Road Transport a Crisis of Complacency. Hoboken: Taylor and Francis. ISBN 9781482208269.
