= User System Interaction =

User-System Interaction (USI)
- Type: Public, Post-Master
- Established: 1995
- Affiliations: SAI, 3TU, TU/e
- Director: Dr. ir. Maddy D. Janse
- Academic staff: 34
- Students: 13 generations of each ca. 20 students
- Location: Eindhoven, The Netherlands
- Website: usi.id.tue.nl

User-System Interaction (USI) is a multidisciplinary, post-Master educational program which provides practical training in the field of human-computer interaction and user interface design. The program is part of the Industrial Design faculty at the Eindhoven University of Technology and is part of the Stan Ackermans Institute and the 3TU, a cooperative initiative between the Eindhoven University of Technology, the Delft University of Technology, and University of Twente.

As in most post-Master programs at Dutch universities, participants are officially both students and employees of the university, with the official job title of Postgraduate Design Engineer. As such, each participant is contractually obligated for the two-year duration of the program and the terms of this employment are subject to the legal provisions for Dutch universities (CAO nederlandse universiteiten). Upon graduation, each student receives a Professional Doctorate in Engineering (PDEng).

== Curriculum ==
The USI program lasts two years and is divided into two parts, the study period and the industrial project.

=== Study Period ===
The study period, lasting 14 months consists of two-week modules, each providing 80 hours of theoretical instruction (lectures) and practical application (project work). Each module is given by a different instructor, and each covers a different aspect of user interaction design. Also part of the study period is a ten-week design case where students work closely with teams either in the university or in an external organization. This part of the curriculum is geared toward introducing students to the entire design cycle.

=== Industrial Project ===
After the study period, students proceed to the industrial project, the nine-month capstone of the USI program. Like the design case, it involves working on a project in a practical environment, either in academia or industry, but goes further in depth. These projects have been carried out in organizations like Philips, Microsoft, Vodafone, Océ, Novay, KPN, Lucent, Nedap and Ericsson, among others.

== Professional Development ==
Parallel to the other two components of the program is professional development (PD). These are a series of workshops that concentrate on various soft skills to round out the curriculum, e.g. presentation skills, project management, and teamwork.

These workshops prepare USI students for life in the professional sector. Since the USI program's emphasis is on working in industry, PD empowers USI students to be capable managers as well as designers, to make them more competitive players in the job market.

== Philosophy ==
At its core, the USI program is multidisciplinary. It accepts inductees from widely varied technical and academic backgrounds, e.g. computer science, psychology, communication technology, behavioral sciences, and new media design. Furthermore, the program is multinational as it has had inductees from countries like the United States, Turkey, Russia, Poland, Brazil, and China, among others.

As each generation consists of around 20 students, admission procedures are designed to create in each generation a mix of inductees with technical and non-technical backgrounds, and a mix of European and non-European students. This mixing of backgrounds and nationalities puts inductees in team-working situations where they can develop their soft skills in a practical, professional environment, much like the environment with which they will be confronted as professionals after graduation.
