= Jaime Gomez (disambiguation) =

Jaime Gomez or Taboo is an American singer, actor, and rapper best known as a member of the Black Eyed Peas.

Jaime Gomez may also refer to:

- Jaime Gómez (footballer, born 1929) (1929–2008), Mexican football goalkeeper
- Jaime Gómez (footballer, born 1993), Mexican football right-back for Querétaro
- Jaime Gomez (golfer) (born 1967), American golfer
- Jaime Gómez-Hernández (born 1960), Spanish civil engineer
- Jaime Gómez Rivas, Spanish physicist and academic
- Jaime Gómez (Salvadoran footballer) (born 1980), Salvadoran footballer
- Jaime Gómez Velásquez (1950–2006), Colombian trade unionist and political scientist
- Jaime Manuel Gómez (born 1972), Mexican American boxer
- Jaime P. Gomez (born 1965), American film and television actor
- Jaime Gomez, leader of the Buddhafield religious movement
