= Martinus Tels =

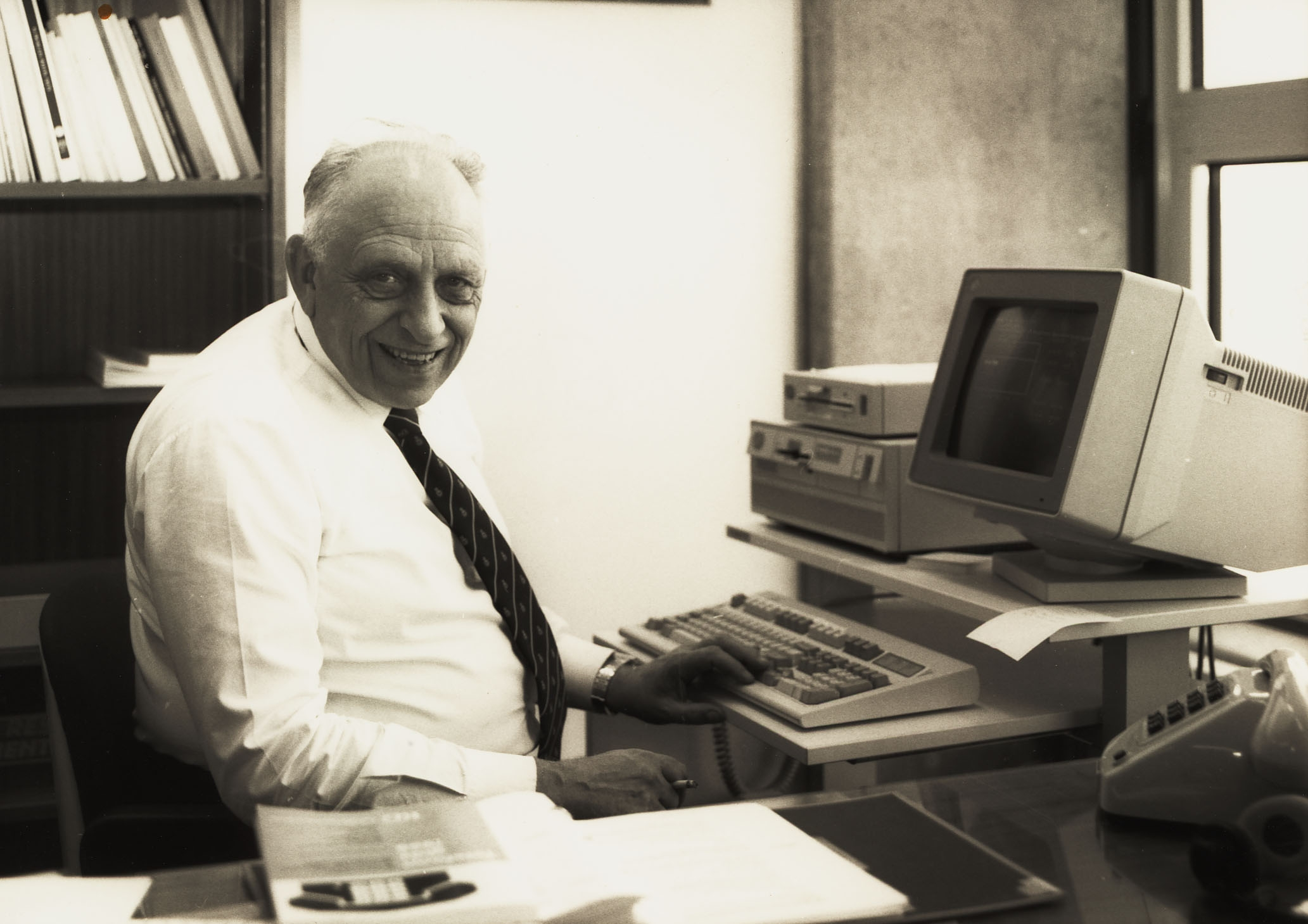
- Prof.ir. Martinus Tels, at his desk in the office of the rector magnificus. Courtesy of the Eindhoven University of Technology archives.
- Born: 16 August 1926; Rotterdam
- Died: 2 January 2008 (aged 81); Veldhoven
- Citizenship: Dutch
- Education: Delft University of Technology
- Scientific career
- Fields: Chemical Engineering
- Workplaces: Delft University of Technology, Caltex, University of Amsterdam, Eindhoven University of Technology

Martinus (Tinus) Tels (16 August 1926 in Rotterdam – 2 January 2008 in Veldhoven) was a Dutch physicist and chemical engineer. He was a professor of chemical engineering, dean of the department of chemical engineering and the ninth rector magnificus of the Eindhoven University of Technology.

== Biography ==
Martinus Tels was born on 16 August 1926 in Rotterdam. He was the son of Harry Hijman Tels (a lawyer) and Lucie Juliette Elias. The Tels family was a reasonably prominent Jewish family in The Netherlands (in addition to Harry Hijman being a lawyer, Harry's grandfather Hartog Hijman Tels was the first editor of the NRC Handelsblad), as was the Elias family (the Elias family owned a large textile factory); because of this the family was added to the Barneveld group during World War II. As part of this group, Martinus Tels was interned in Barneveld, then in the Westerbork transit camp and finally in the Theresienstadt concentration camp. Surviving the war, he returned to The Netherlands by way of Switzerland in 1945.

Arriving back in The Netherlands he completed his secondary education and then attended the Delft University of Technology to study chemistry. He stayed on at Delft as an associate professor (then called a hoofdassistent in Dutch), doing research in mixing solid oils with sugars and the purification of surface water. During these years he also worked for zionist causes and was president of the Dutch Zionist Union (Dutch: Nederlandse Zionistenbond).

In 1960 he moved to Caltex, to become head of the distillation lab. He was with Caltex until 1969 and in that time also headed the pilot plants division and finally the division for "applied mathematics and electronic data processing". In 1967 he was also appointed extraordinary professor of Physical Technology (now called Chemical Engineering) at the University of Amsterdam; here he researched drag-reduction, the mixing of liquids in packed beds and thermal stability of adiabatic stirred reactors.

Professor Tels was appointed full professor of physical technology at the department of Chemical Engineering of the Eindhoven University of Technology in 1974. In this position he researched the uses of pyrolysis in physical technology and in the separation of solid waste materials. His expertise brought him into contact with the Van Gansewinkel waste management company, which he advised for years. He was one of the first researchers in The Netherlands working on waste management; for this reason he was jokingly called "the garbage professor".

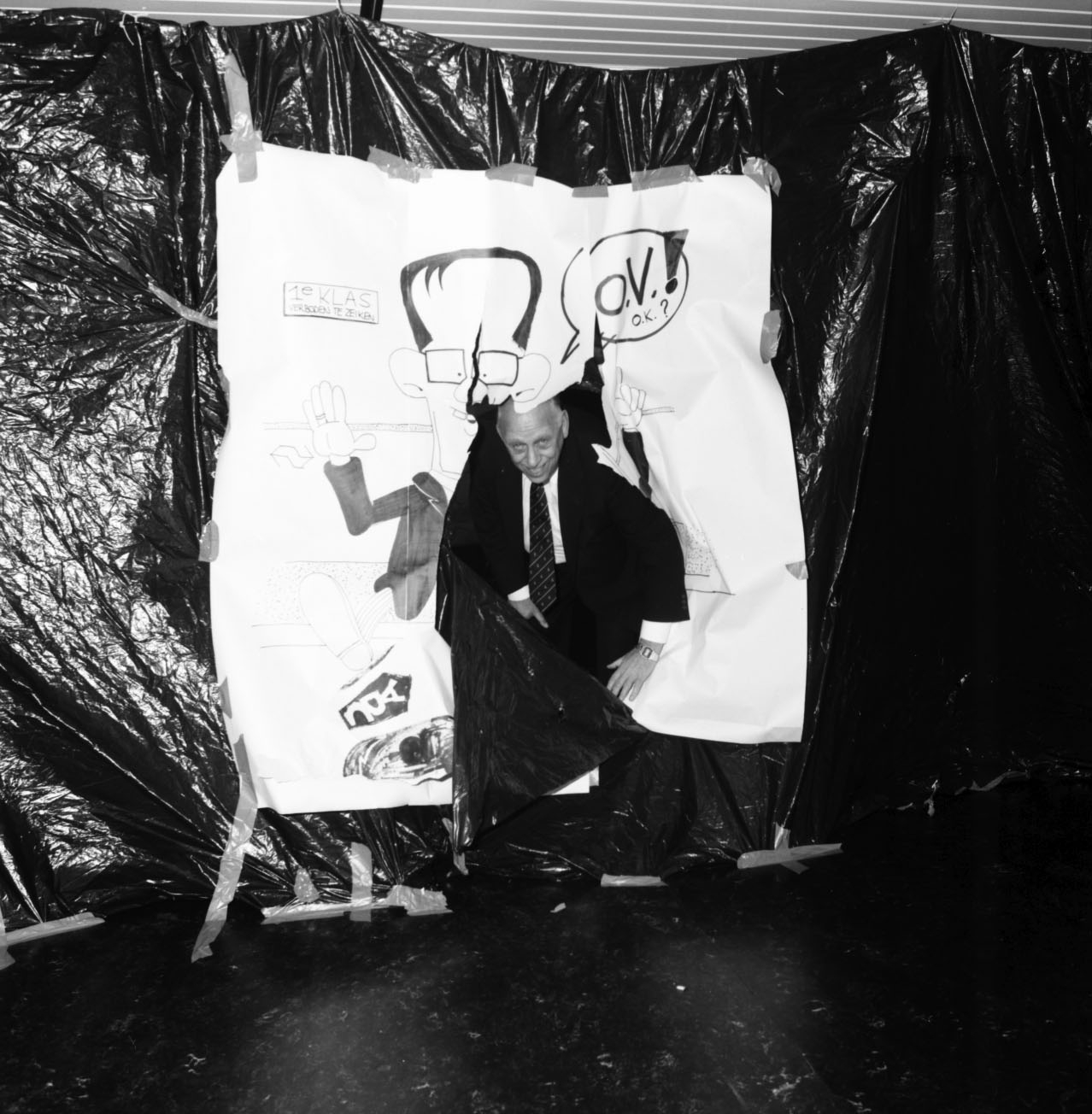
Professor Tels, joining a student protest against minister Deetman of Education in 1988. Courtesy of Eindhoven University of Technology archives.

Aside from his research, Tels had a reputation for being a good teacher and employing (often self-deprecating) humor in order to engage his students. He was appointed vice dean of the department in 1977 and became dean in 1982.

Tels was appointed rector magnificus of the university in 1988. In his period as rector he focused on strengthening ties with the city of Eindhoven and with local industry. He was asked to resign as rector by the university council in 1991, following the Buck-Goudsmit scandal. Although he was finally not forced out, he resigned as rector to prevent an administrative crisis at the university.

Upon his resignation he was awarded the Honors Medal of the university by the TU/e, which he received from his successor as rector Professor Van Lint. The year after his retirement from the university he was made a Knight in the Order of the Dutch Lion, after being nominated jointly by the Minister of Education for his work as a professor and by the Minister of the Environment for his work in environmental technology.

Professor Tels continued advising the Van Gansewinkel Group until 1996, through Swiwah B.V., a one-man company he founded (swiwah is Hebrew for "environment"). He died on 2 January 2008, after suffering a heart attack.

== Honors ==
During his career, professor Tels received the following honors:

- Lenin medal of the University of Sofia (1983?)
- Honors Medal of the Eindhoven University of Technology (1991)
- Knight in the Order of the Dutch Lion (1992)
