= List of post-nominal letters (Netherlands) =

Post-nominal letters used in the Netherlands

Post-nominal letters in the Netherlands are used only in a limited number of domains. Unlike countries such as the United Kingdom, the Netherlands does not maintain a national system of post-nominals for state honours, civil precedence or public offices. Official post-nominals exist primarily for academic degrees, protected professional qualifications, and religious institutes.

== Orders and decorations ==
The Kingdom of the Netherlands does not assign official post-nominal letters to recipients of national honours. However, Knights of the Military William Order are often referred with the post-nominal letters R.M.W.O.; its use of the letters has historically evolved (following British tradition) and is widely recognized (although never been formally established).

Post-nominal	Meaning	Legal basis / notes
RMWO	Ridder Militaire Willems-Orde (Knight of the Military William Order)	Socially established; not officially recognised

== University degrees and academic qualifications ==
Academic post-nominals in the Netherlands are regulated under the Higher Education and Research Act (Wet op het hoger onderwijs en wetenschappelijk onderzoek, WHW).

=== Degree post-nominals ===
Post-nominal	Degree type	Full degree name	Legal basis / notes
BA	Bachelor	Bachelor of Arts	WHW Article 7.10a
BSc	Bachelor	Bachelor of Science	WHW Article 7.10a
BBA	Bachelor	Bachelor of Business Administration	WHW Article 7.10a
LLB	Bachelor	Bachelor of Laws	WHW Article 7.10a
MA	Master	Master of Arts	WHW Article 7.10a
MSc	Master	Master of Science	WHW Article 7.10a
LLM	Master	Master of Laws	WHW Article 7.10a
MBA	Master	Master of Business Administration	WHW Article 7.10a
PhD	Doctoral degree	Doctor of Philosophy	WHW Article 7.22(3)
PDEng	Professional doctorate	Professional Doctorate in Engineering	WHW-recognised; awarded by 4TU

=== Degrees not used in the Netherlands ===
- MD: not officially used in the Dutch medical system
- MPhil: not awarded in the Netherlands

== Religious institutes ==
Members of Catholic religious orders in the Netherlands use the same post-nominals as their international counterparts.

Post-nominal	Institute
SJ	Society of Jesus
OFM	Order of Friars Minor
OP	Order of Preachers
OSB	Order of Saint Benedict
CR	Congregation of the Resurrection

== Professional qualifications ==
A limited number of Dutch professional designations use post-nominal letters. These titles are regulated by Dutch professional bodies and may be used only by individuals who have completed the required accredited training and registration.

Post-nominal	Profession	Regulation / awarding body
RA	Register Accountant	Protected by law; regulated by the NBA
RE	Register-Expert Accountant	Post-master qualification; regulated by the NBA
RE	Register EDP-Auditor	IT-audit qualification; regulated by NOREA
RO	Register Operational Auditor	Recognised professional qualification
RC	Register Controller	Post-experience master’s qualification (MSc RC); regulated by VRC

=== Not used as post-nominals ===
- RV (Register Valuator): recognised professional qualification, but not used as a post-nominal suffix.

== See also ==
- Lists of post-nominal letters
