= Stan Ackermans =

Dutch mathematician (1936–1995)

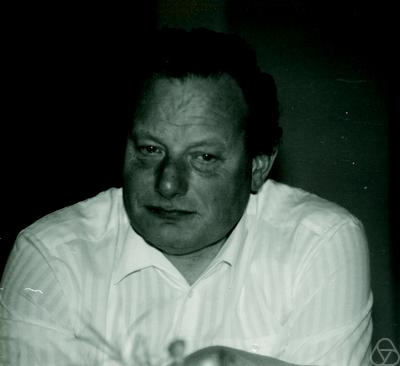
- Stan Ackermans
- Born: Stanislaus Thomas Maria Ackermans; 26 July 1936; Amsterdam
- Died: 19 March 1995 (aged 58); Eindhoven
- Citizenship: Dutch
- Education: University of Amsterdam
- Known for: Algebra en Analyse; Stan Ackermans Instituut
- Spouse: José C.J.M. Loonen

Stanislaus Thomas Maria (Stan) Ackermans (1936 – 1995) was a Dutch mathematician, and the seventh rector magnificus of the Eindhoven University of Technology. He was also one of the founders, the namesake and the first director of the Stan Ackermans Instituut.

== Biography ==
Ackermans was the son of Rie A.G. Schonk and Anton J.J.M. Ackermans, a high school teacher in Amsterdam. Following his secondary education, Ackermans attended the University of Amsterdam, where he studied mathematics; he graduated under professor N.G. de Bruijn. In 1961 he followed his professor to Eindhoven to work under him again, this time on his Ph.D. (which he was granted in 1964). In the period of 1967–68 he worked at UCLA. He was appointed full professor of mathematics back in Eindhoven in 1972, for the chairs of algebra and functional analysis.

Ackermans became dean of the mathematics department in 1978; he remained as the dean until 1981, when he became conrector of the university. In 1982 he succeeded Professor Hans Erkelens as rector magnificus. This was also the year of the two-phase structural reformation of higher education in The Netherlands (Dutch: Tweefasenstructuur wetenschappelijk onderwijs) and the financial cutback program Division of labor and concentration (Dutch: Taakverdeling en concentratie), which were mandated by the Ministry of Education.

Ackermans completed one term as rector. In 1986 he took the initiative in founding the Institute for Continuing Education (Dutch: Instituut Vervolgopleidingen), of which he became the scientific director. This institute offers two-year, post-graduate technical designer education to graduates of the two-phase programs; the institute was renamed the Stan Ackermans Institute after Ackerman's death in 1995.

== Notable publications ==
- Algebra en Analyse (Academic Science, Den Haag, 1976; ISBN 978-90-01-01251-9) together with Professor Jack Van Lint — textbook used for decades at the university.
