= Stefan Bon =

British researcher

Stefan A. F. Bon
- Education: Eindhoven University of Technology
- Scientific career
- Fields: Polymer and colloid chemical engineering
- Workplaces: University of Warwick
- Thesis: Debut : collected studies on nitroxide-mediated controlled radical polymerization (1998)
- Doctoral advisor: Anton L. German
- Website: BonLab

Stefan A. F. Bon is a Professor of Chemical Engineering in the department of Chemistry at the University of Warwick, United Kingdom. His research considers polymer-based colloids. He is a Fellow of the International Union of Pure and Applied Chemistry, an elected member of the International Polymer Colloids Group (IPCG), and was a member of the physical Newton international fellowship committee 2020-2025, and served as the Royal Society of Chemistry Outreach Lecturer in 2015-2016.

== Academic career ==
Bon studied chemical engineering at the Eindhoven University of Technology (TUe) in the Netherlands, obtaining his integrated undergraduate and MSc in Chemical Engineering (ir.) in 1993 (cum laude met lof). He continued to specialize in the area of polymer and colloid science, with research in nitroxide-mediated reversible-deactivation radical polymerization (RDRP), and obtained his PhD in 1998 in polymer chemistry under the supervision of Anton L. German. He worked as a postdoctoral research assistant with David M. Haddleton at the University of Warwick from spring 1998, and was appointed as Unilever Lecturer in polymer chemistry in January 2001. He continues his career at the University of Warwick where he is a professor in polymer and colloid chemical engineering.

== Research ==
Bon pioneered nitroxide-mediated reversible-deactiviation radical emulsion polymerization. His current research takes a chemical engineering and soft matter physics approach to sustainable polymer and colloidal systems. Current (2026) research themes in the BonLab are: 1) supracolloidal metamaterials, 2) dynamic materials including out-of-equilibrium active matter, 3) sustainability and environmental fate of liquid formulations, and 4) sustainable polymer materials. Bon has extensive experience working with a wide range of industrial collaborators on projects with applications in coatings and adhesives, personal care products, agricultural formulations, and paper.

Alongside his academic research, Bon is chair of the Polymer Club, an industrial consortium that promotes research and education in polymer and colloid science. He is the founder and host of the 2020 COVID19 international polymer colloids group webinar series. He is also a member of the physical Newton international fellowship committee.

== Honours and awards ==
- Elected Fellow of the International Union of Pure and Applied Chemistry
- Royal Society of Chemistry Materials Division Outreach Lecturer (2015-2016)
- Winner of a Warwick Award for Teaching Excellence [WATE] (2021).

== Selected publications ==
- Small molecule organic eutectics as candidates to replace plastics. Ryan, J., L.; Sosso, G., C.; and Bon, S., A., F. Chem. Sci., 15: 14458-14470. 2024. DOI https://doi.org/10.1039/D4SC02574A
- A mesh reinforced pressure-sensitive adhesive for a linerless label design. Brogden, E., M.; Wilson, P., F.; Hindmarsh, S.; Hands-Portman, I.; Unsworth, A.; Liarou, E.; and Bon, S., A., F. RSC Applied Polymers, 2: 248-261. 2024. DOI https://doi.org/10.1039/D3LP00224A
- Samuel R. Wilson-Whitford, Ross W. Jaggers, Brooke W. Longbottom, Matt K. Donald, Guy J. Clarkson, and Stefan A. F. Bon (22 January 2021). "Textured Microcapsules through Crystallization". ACS Applied Materials and Interfaces. 13 (4): 5887-5894. doi:10.1021/acsami.0c22378
- Tobias Kaufmann; Talha Gökmen; Christian Wendeln; et al. (2011). ""Sandwich" microcontact printing as a mild route towards monodisperse Janus particles with tailored bifunctionality". Advanced Materials. 23 (1): 79–83. doi:10.1002/adma.201003564. PMID 21069890. Wikidata Q57711254.
- Thomas M Ruhland; Gröschel, André; Nicholas Ballard; Thomas S Skelhon; Walther, Andreas; Müller, Axel; Bon, Stefan Antonius Franciscus (2013). "Influence of Janus particle shape on their interfacial behavior at liquid-liquid interfaces". Langmuir. 29 (5): 1388–1394. doi:10.1021/la3048642. PMID 23311383. Wikidata Q44774009.
- Catheline A L Colard; Roberto F A Teixeira; Bon, Stefan Antonius Franciscus (2010). "Unraveling mechanistic events in solids-stabilized emulsion polymerization by monitoring the concentration of nanoparticles in the water phase". Langmuir. 26 (11): 7915–7921. doi:10.1021/la904817f. PMID 20170123. Wikidata Q43156563.
