= Pdeng =

PDEng may stand for:

- Professional Doctorate in Engineering (PDEng), a postgraduate engineering title
- Professional Development for Engineering Students (PDEng), a program at the University of Waterloo for all undergraduate engineering students
