= Harry Lintsen =

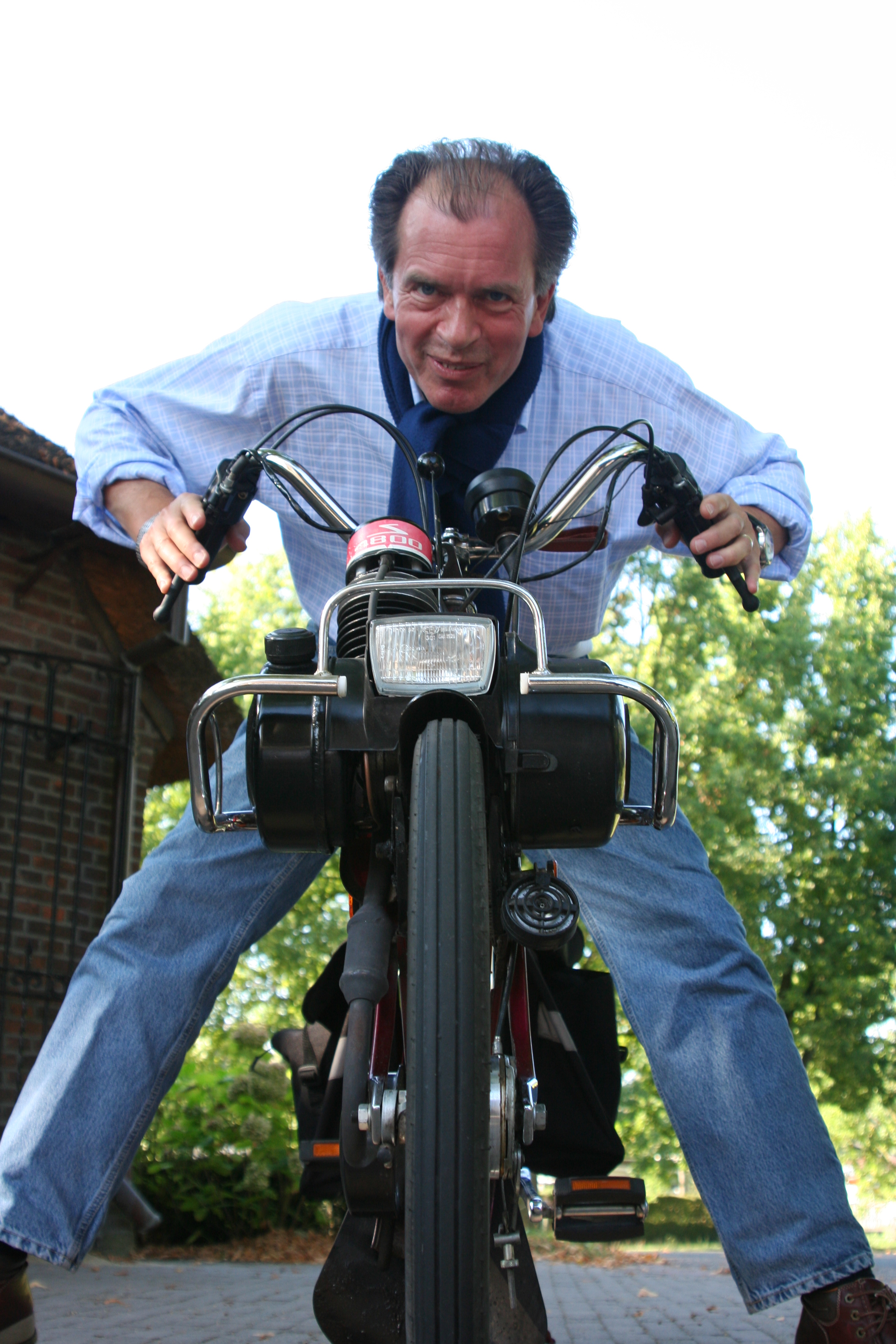
Harry Lintsen

Harry Lintsen (July 17, 1949 - August 12, 2025) was a Dutch scientist. He was professor in history of technology at Eindhoven University of Technology, Netherlands, and researcher on microplastics.

== Career ==
Lintsen was born on July 17, 1949, in the town of Heerlen, The Netherlands.

Lintsen has devoted his career to the development and institutionalisation of history of technology in the Netherlands. One of the highlights has been the establishment of the Foundation for the History of Technology – at Lintsen’s initiative – by the Koninklijk Instituut van Ingenieurs (KIvI) in 1988, which to this day remains the most important organization for domestic and international research programmes on the history of technology.

Lintsen has held numerous positions within Eindhoven University of Technology, including vice-dean of the department of industrial engineering and innovation sciences, chairman of the study programme committee and chairman of the general sciences group. He also regularly serves outside Eindhoven, for example as a member on the Committee for the Heineken History Award, member of the executive council of the Society for the History of Technology (SHOT), and is member of the Royal Netherlands Academy of Arts and Sciences (KNAW) since 1999.

Lintsen studied physics at the Eindhoven University of Technology. He graduated in 1972 with a specialty in physical technology. In the meantime Lintsen was a research assistant to Prof. Bert Broer. He continued to work in Eindhoven after graduation, being employed as an assistant professor in science and society, at the department of applied science.

Between 1974 and 1978 Harry Lintsen worked on a PhD thesis on the rise and development of the engineering profession in The Netherlands in the 19th century. It was published in 1980 as Ingenieurs in Nederland in de 19e eeuw: Een streven naar erkenning en macht (Dutch engineers in the 19th century: The quest for recognition and power). Supervisors were Bert Broer, B.C. van Houten, and A.L. Mok.

In 1986 Lintsen was named scientific director of the Foundation for the History of Technology (Stichting Historie der Techniek), housed at Eindhoven University of Technology. He became full professor sharing his time between Eindhoven and Delft University of Technology in 1990. During the academic year 1994-1995 Lintsen was visiting professor at the University of Pennsylvania, Philadelphia in the United States.

As a project leader, Lintsen helped shape the extensive research project Technology in the Netherlands, which brought together various Dutch historians, resulted in many dissertations, and contributed to studies on the history of major Dutch companies. The results of the research were compiled in the thirteen-volume standard work in Dutch. An English compilation of the history of technology of the Netherlands in the twentieth century Technology and the Making of the Netherlands was published MIT Press. In his research and teaching, Lintsen reflected critically on the role of technology and the great responsibility engineers have in shaping it. This increasingly became the focus of his research, including the work he developed after his retirement in 2010. The relationships between technological development, broad prosperity, sustainability, and the future became central themes in his work. An English compilation of the project was published un the title Well-being, sustainability and social development: The Netherlands 1850-2050 published by Springer.

In 2003 Lintsen was decorated by Queen Beatrix as an Officer in the Order of Orange-Nassau.

== Key publications ==
- Harry Lintsen, Frank Veraart, Jan-Pieter Smits, John Grin (2018). Well-being, Sustainability and Social Development, The Netherlands 1850–2050.Springer
- Johan Schot, Harry Lintsen, Arie Rip. (2010). Technology and the Making of the Netherlands. MIT Press
- J.W. Schot, Bruheze, A.A. de la, Lintsen, H.W., Rip, A. (2005). De betwiste modernisering van Nederland. Een introductie op de serie 'Techniek in Nederland in de Twintigste Eeuw'. Bijdragen en mededelingen betreffende de geschiedenis der Nederlanden, 120(1), 48-50.
- H.W. Lintsen, (2007). Techniek in actie : een geschiedenis van TNO Industrie en Techniek. Eindhoven: TNO Industrie en Techniek with Stichting Historie der Techniek.
- H.W. Lintsen & J.L Schippers (2006). Gedreven door nieuwsgierigheid: een selectie uit 50 jaar TU/e-onderzoek. Eindhoven: Stichting Historie der Techniek i.s.m. TU/e.
- H.W. Lintsen (2005). Made in Holland: Een techniekgeschiedenis van Nederland 1800-2000. Zutphen: Walburg Pers.
- H.W. Lintsen (2002). "Two Centuries of Central Water Management in the Netherlands". Technology and Culture 43(3), 549-568.
- J.W. Schot, H.W. Lintsen, A. Rip and A.A. Albert de la Bruhèze, eds. (1998–2003). Techniek in Nederland in de twintigste eeuw [Technology in the Netherlands in the 20th century] Zuthpen: Walburg Pers, seven volumes.
- H.W. Lintsen et al., eds. (1992–1995), Geschiedenis van de Techniek in Nederland. De wording van een moderne samenleving 1800-1890 [History of technology in the Netherlands. Modern society in the making, 1800-1890] Zutphen: Walburg Pers, six volumes.
- H.W. Lintsen, ed. (1988). Twee Eeuwen Rijkswaterstaat, 1798-1998 [Two centuries of the Directorate General for Public Works and Water Management], Zaltbommel.
