= Henk Buck =

Dutch chemist (1930–2023)

Henk Buck (7 February 1930 – 27 November 2023) was a Dutch organic chemist. He was born in Dordrecht on 7 February 1930. Buck studied at the University of Leiden where he received his PhD in 1959. He got a lectorship at the university in Theoretical Organic Chemistry in 1964. For his research he received the Golden Medal of the Royal Netherlands Chemical Society in 1967. In 1970 he was appointed professor of Physical Organic Chemistry and Organic Chemistry at the University of Technology in Eindhoven. Because there was no chair for Theoretical Chemistry and Biochemistry he gave lectures in organic chemistry, physical organic chemistry, theoretical organic chemistry, biochemistry and biotechnology. From 1988 to 1991 he was Dean of the Chemical Faculty. For his scientific contributions he became a member of the Royal Netherlands Academy of Arts and Sciences in 1979. During his scientific career he published more than 300 scientific papers spread over a large area of the chemical field. Under his supervision 43 chemical engineers obtained their PhD. The end of his career came prematurely because of a publication in Science in 1990 regarding a possible cure for cancer that had to be retracted because of flawed research.

== Research ==
His research in Leiden and later in Eindhoven was focused on organic chemistry as the homogeneous catalysis of the oxidation of hydrocarbons with stable carbenium ions as the pentamethylbenzyl cation and the chiral induction with the redox couple NADH-NAD^{+} in the nearly 100% stereospecific hydride transfer to ketones and imines. The latter process is controlled by the out-of-plane orientation of the carboxamide group. In the field of physical chemistry his work was directed on electron spin resonance measurements of phosphoranyl radicals with phosphorus in different geometries as the tetrahedral and the trigonal bipyramidal configuration with the unpaired electron in an equatorial or axial orientation. His contribution to the theoretical organic chemistry was based on Ab initio calculations of the radiationless transition of formaldehyde and ab initio calculations of single vibronic level fluorescence emission spectra and absolute radiative lifetimes of formaldehyde. Further he investigated deviations of the Woodward-Hoffmann rules as the photochemical [1,3]-OH shift in 2-propen-1-ol. Here the stereochemical outcome is determined by relaxation of the excited double bond. A thermal study of the cis-[1,5]-H shifts in 1,3-pentadiene showed the effect of vibrationally assisted tunneling in this geometric orientation.

A special topic in his research was organophosphorus chemistry. An important aspect of this project was based on the possibility of phosphorus (IV) to accommodate a fifth ligand under formation of a trigonal bipyramid which shows a number of unique properties. The significance of this geometrical change has been demonstrated in the conformational transmission in DNA for the B-Z transition with alternating CpG units under selective phosphate shielding. This change in geometry of phosphorus was also applicable on the biochemical dynamics of cAMP. Because of the importance of shielding, the OCH_{3} group was introduced as substitute for O^{−} in the study of intermediates for conformational transmission. This also resulted in the synthesis of phosphate-methylated DNAs and RNAs. Methylphosphotriester DNAs were synthesized with 2-12 bases. Neutralization of the charge of the phosphate linkages by (specific) methylation resulted in methylphosphotriester DNAs with very exclusive (bio)chemical properties. The introduction of chirality at phosphorus appeared of importance for intra- and intermolecular dynamics. These modified DNAs mimicked the behavior of natural DNA in the absence of stabilizing factors as salts, proteins, and medium factors. In fact a high site-specific hybridization affinity was obtained with complementary natural DNA. In dependence of the bases, parallel DNA could be synthesized for pyrimidine bases in which the chirality of phosphorus was decisive. Phosphate methylation also gave the possibility to synthesize a self-complementary left-handed Z-DNA mini duplex.

After a publication in Science about the inhibition of HIV-1 replication had to be retracted, because it was based on flawed research, he accepted early retirement in 1990. (see The Buck-Goudsmit controversy)

At home without any academic support he wrote several articles based on quantum chemical calculations focused on the dynamics of organic reactions, electron spin resonance of organophosphorus radicals and the hybridization affinity of methylphosphotriester DNA and RNA. The latter subject is published as review articles in Nucleosides, Nucleotides & Nucleic Acids. In these reviews he gives also a description and explanation of the chemical and corresponding biochemical results of the methylphosphotriester DNA, RNA and related systems. This contribution that is mainly based on the work at Eindhoven also consists of new insights in solid-phase synthesis, B-Z transition, and methyl transfer reactions connected with replicational and transcriptional silencing. Special attention is given to the effect of phosphate shielding on duplex stability. Models based on molecular mechanics calculations and recent density functional ab initio calculations support the impact of phosphate shielding at the various levels of stability of the DNA duplex.

=== The Buck-Goudsmit controversy ===
In the mid-80s Henk Buck focused his research on the use of antisense DNA as an inhibitor of virus replication. Paul C. Zamecnik is generally regarded as the founder of this technique, but already in 1971 Paul S. Miller created short phosphate methylated DNA-fragments, and considered the possibility of using this as a means of influencing DNA-replication. Buck's research group focused on the use of this phosphate methylated DNA, in particular because of its neutral electrical properties. In several publications the selectivity and duplex forming were reported.

The strong growth of HIV-infections in those days, commercial interests and patent rights led to the decision to cooperate with the virologist Jaap Goudsmit of the Academic Medical Center of Amsterdam University. Jaap Goudsmit required longer DNA-strands, though, than the ones Buck was testing so far, so a new synthesis route was developed. Jaap Goudsmit tested the new strands on samples of HIV and reported the inhibition of the virus replication.

The results were published in Science on April 13, 1990.

On the eve of the publication, the University of Eindhoven made the news public. It resulted in excited media attention in the Netherlands, and under the pressure Buck publicly stated that he assumed that AIDS would be of the past in a couple of years, although it was agreed not to make such claims. Afterwards he explained, he deliberately had said this to raise more funds for his research, although much later he defended himself by saying that he was provoked by the reporter.

Doubts raised immediately after the article appeared in Science. The next day, the Leiden University professor Van Boom, expert in the field of DNA synthesis, said in a leading Dutch newspaper, that pure phosphate methylated DNA is very difficult to produce, and easily contaminated. Six days after the publication internal criticism came to the surface. Buck colleague, professor Van Boeckel, also an expert in this field, had already criticized Buck's research a year before, and resigned because his warnings were not taken seriously. Van Boeckel had also been working on synthesis of phosphate methylated DNA, and knew how difficult it was to make such DNA-strands. A year before Buck's downfall, he came to the conclusion that Buck's longer strands could not be pure, because Van Boeckel's research-assistant Kuijpers noticed that even a short phosphate methylated DNA wasn't stable. In May 1989 he invited one of Buck's research assistants to test their material on HPLC equipment in the lab of Organon, a Dutch pharmaceutical company. The measurement showed that the test material was not at all pure, but Buck refused to accept this fact. When Van Boeckel showed Buck a draft of the publication of his own research at the end of 1989, it resulted in a confrontation in which the university chose Buck's side. Van Boeckel and Kuijpers were ordered to stop their research, because "it was too expensive and not productive".

The doubts and criticism following the publication in Science led to a heated public debate in several Dutch newspapers and science magazines, and the university eventually acknowledged that the purity of the phosphate methylated DNA was still to be investigated. A committee was formed to investigate the proceedings and their conclusion (30 August 1990) was, that no phosphate methylated DNA could be traced. Also the committee reproached Buck for not paying attention to criticism from within his faculty. As a result, Buck was dismissed as dean of the faculty. Goudsmit was requested to test the antisense material once again, but his enthusiasm had cooled, and Buck could not produce the pure phosphate methylated DNA in time.

The publication in Science therefore had to be retracted.

A second investigating committee reported at the end of the year that the presentation of the results in Science bordered on fraud. The report also said that Buck's behaviour in his group was impermissibly harsh at times. The committee concluded that it disqualified him as a research leader. As a result, Buck accepted early retirement.

Although Jaap Goudsmit generally was regarded as a victim in the affair, half a year later a journalist of a leading newspaper questioned his role in the débâcle. Goudsmit had reported the inhibition of HIV-replication, which was questionable, given the fact that the phosphate methylated DNA was not pure enough. Therefore, a third committee investigated the work of Goudsmit and his group as well. The committee concluded that Goudsmit had not checked the quality of Buck's material. Also they saw shortcomings in the interpretation and presentation of the results. The committee concluded that Goudsmit's research had been scientifically inadequate. Goudsmit did not go in appeal and could continue his work.

Henk Buck never accepted the outcome of this controversy. He persisted in his opinion that he could produce sufficiently pure phosphate methylated DNA. In several interviews he said that he felt that he has been pilloried for making a sincere mistake. He published two articles in the scientific magazine Nucleosides, Nucleotides and Nucleic Acids in which he tries to retrace what happened, and he goes as far as to claim that the investigating committees were wrong.

To this day, however, nobody produced pure phosphate methylated DNA strands in the quality Goudsmit required. All the efforts from Miller, Van Boeckel and Buck resulted in short instable fragments. Recent researches in this field are based on methyl phosphonate or phosphorothioate DNA. At present (2008) only one antisense medication exists, based on phosphorothioate oligonucleotide: Fomivirsen.

Buck died in Tilburg on 27 November 2023, at the age of 93.

== Sources ==
- Hagendijk, R. en Meeus, J. (1993) "Blind faith: fact, fiction and fraud in public controversy over science". Public Understanding of Science, Vol. 2, No. 4, pp. 391-415.
- Rozendaal, S. (1992) "Barbertje wil weer werken. Waarom AIDS-onderzoeker Henk Buck moest hangen". Elsevier 21-10-1992, pp. 96–100
