= Piet Lemstra =

Dutch chemist

P.J. (Piet) Lemstra (born 26 October 1946, Godlinze (Groningen)), nicknamed Plem, is a Dutch professor of chemistry.

Prof. Lemstra received his PhD from the University of Groningen in 1975. He then post-doctoral fellow at the University of Bristol (UK) under Professor Andrew Keller FRS. In 1985 Professor Lemstra became professor of Polymer Technology at the Eindhoven University of Technology . From 1990 to 1995 he was the first Dean of the Faculty of Chemical Technology. From 1994 to 1997 had been director of the graduate school (PTN) and in 1997 he founded together with Professor Leen Struik the Dutch Polymer Institute (DPI), where he worked until 2004 as scientific director. In 2004 he founded the Polymer Technology Group Eindhoven BV with Laurent Nelissen, in favor of cooperation with SMEs. In February 2008, Lemstra (until March 2011) Dean again.

Piet Lemstra is the younger brother of former politician Wolter Lemstra.
