= Silvia Lenaerts =

Belgian chemist

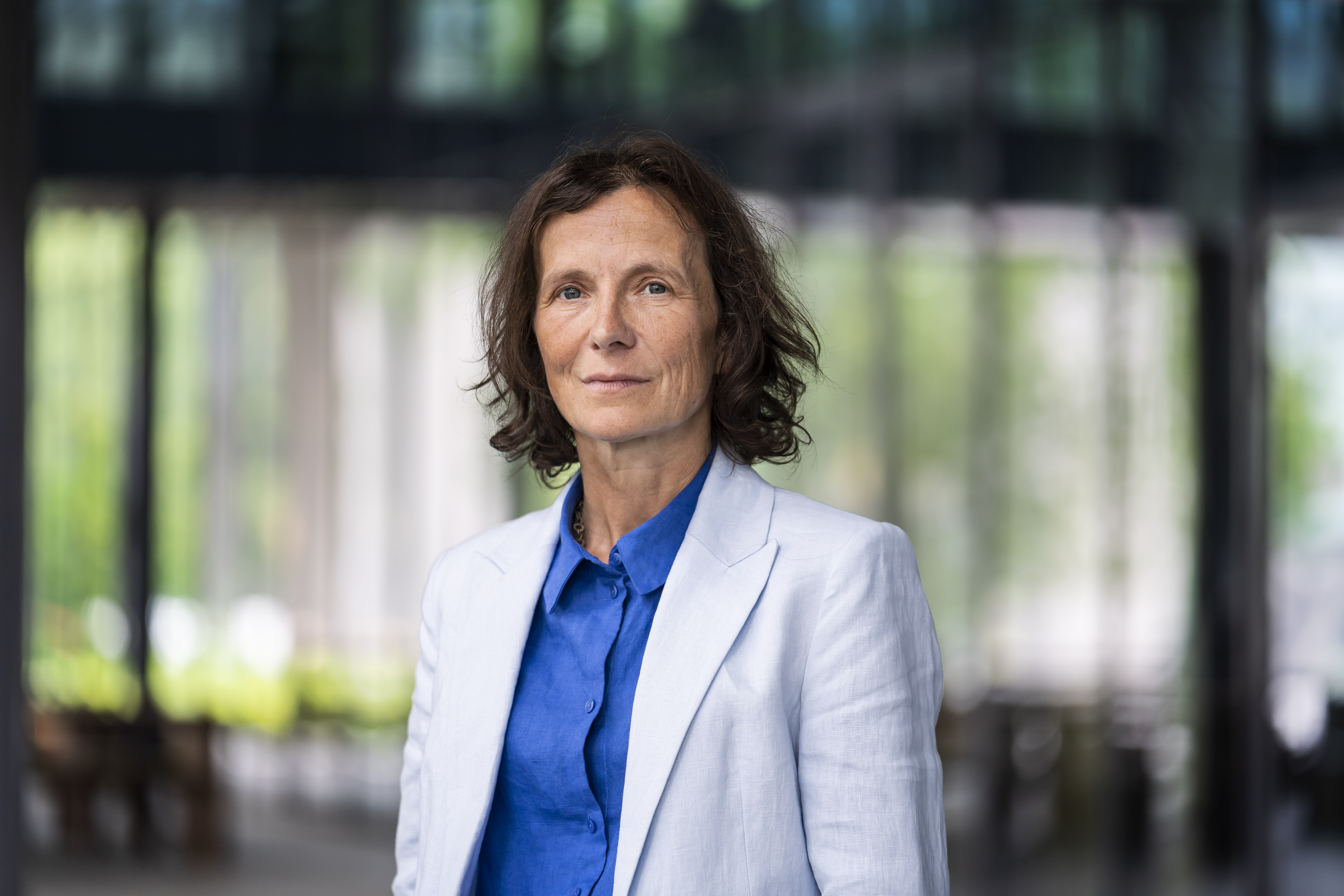
Silvia Lenaerts

Silvia Lenaerts (Bree, 1966) is a Belgian chemist. She has been rector magnificus of Eindhoven University of Technology in the Netherlands since 11 May 2023. Before that, she was the first vice-rector of valorisation & development at the University of Antwerp, Belgium. Lenaerts is the first female rector of a technical university in the Netherlands. She is a strong advocate of cooperation between universities, government, and industry in finding solutions to societal problems.

== Education and early career ==
Lenaerts studied chemistry at KU Leuven. She was the first chemist to obtain a PhD at IMEC. IMEC is the Flemish research centre for nanoelectronics and digital technology. In the following years, Lenaerts was involved in a startup to develop gas sensors. This technology was acquired by Bosch.

== University of Antwerp ==
In 2007, Lenaerts left for the University of Antwerp. There she became head of the Sustainable Energy, Air and Water Technology (DuEL) research group she founded. At the same university, Lenaerts became vice-rector with the Valorisation and Development portfolio in 2016.

As vice-rector, Lenaerts dedicated herself to connecting the Antwerp university with Flemish business, society and (European, federal and Flemish) government, focusing on three areas: digitisation, sustainable chemistry and materials, and infectious diseases. She held several directorships, including at Lantis (Livable Antwerp through Innovation and Cooperation).

== Rector magnificus TU Eindhoven ==
Lenaerts has been rector magnificus (president) of Eindhoven University of Technology (TU Eindhoven) in the Netherlands since 11 May 2023. She was the first female rector of a technical university in the Netherlands. She also leads Eindhoven University's Future Chips flagship, focused on semiconductor technology, in collaboration with strategic research and innovation partners in the Netherlands and elsewhere.

== Work for Europe ==
Since 2002, Lenaerts has worked for the European Commission as an expert, reviewer, adviser on framework programmes and member of the expert groups of the European University Association (EUA) on research and innovation strategy, and on innovation ecosystems. In 2022, she joined the European Institute of Innovation and Technology (EIT) as a board member.
