= Eindhoven University of Technology =

University in Eindhoven, Netherlands

- Technische Universiteit Eindhoven
- Motto: Mens agitat molem (Latin)
- Motto in English: "Mind moves matter"
- Type: Public, technical
- Established: 23 June 1956; 70 years ago
- Affiliations: 4TU, CESAER, Santander, CLUSTER, EUA and EuroTech
- Budget: €603.2M (2025)
- President: Koen Janssen
- Rector: Silvia Lenaerts
- Administrative staff: 4.344
- Students: 13.854
- Location: Eindhoven, Netherlands; 51°26′53″N 5°29′23″E
- Campus: Urban, 121 ha (300 acres)
- Colors: Scarlet
- Website: www.tue.nl/en

The Eindhoven University of Technology (Dutch: Technische Universiteit Eindhoven; TU/e) is a public technical university in the Netherlands, situated in Eindhoven. In 2025–26, around 14,000 students were enrolled in its BSc and MSc programs and around 2200 students were enrolled in its PhD and EngD programs. In 2025, the TU/e employed around 4300 people.

TU/e is the Dutch member of the EuroTech Universities Alliance, a partnership of European universities of science & technology. The other members are Technical University of Denmark (DTU), École Polytechnique Fédérale de Lausanne (EPFL), École Polytechnique (L’X), The Technion, and Technical University of Munich (TUM).

== History ==
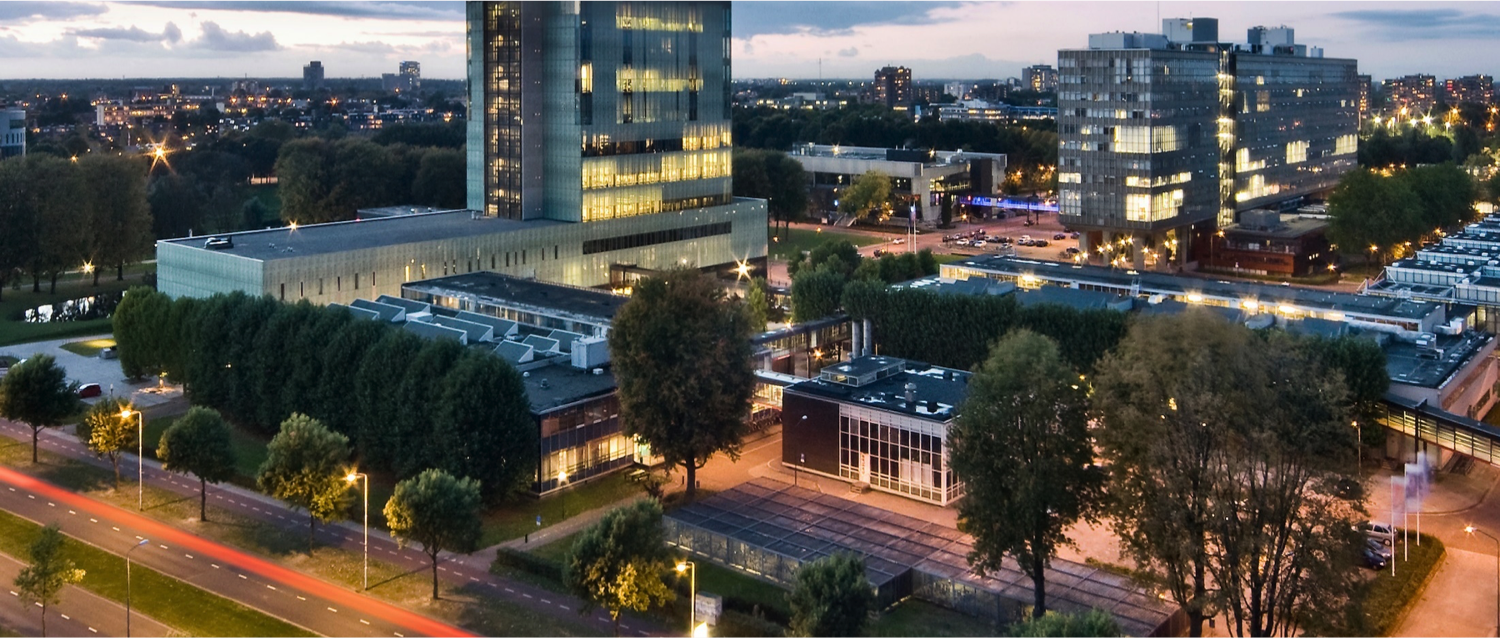
TU by night

The Eindhoven University of Technology was founded as the Technische Hogeschool Eindhoven (THE) on 23 June 1956 by the Dutch government. It was the second institute of its kind in the Netherlands, after the Delft University of Technology.

Undergraduate education was given in four- or five-year programs until 2002, styled along the lines of the German system of education; graduates of these programs were granted an engineering title and allowed to prefix their name with the title ir. (an abbreviation of ingenieur; not to be confused with graduates of technical hogescholen, who were engineers abbreviated ing.). Starting in 2002, following the entry into force of the Bologna Accords, the university switched to the bachelor/master structure (students graduating in 2002 were given both an old-style engineering title and a new master's title). The undergraduate programs are now split into two parts, a three-year bachelor program and a two-year master program.

=== 2011–2020 plans ===
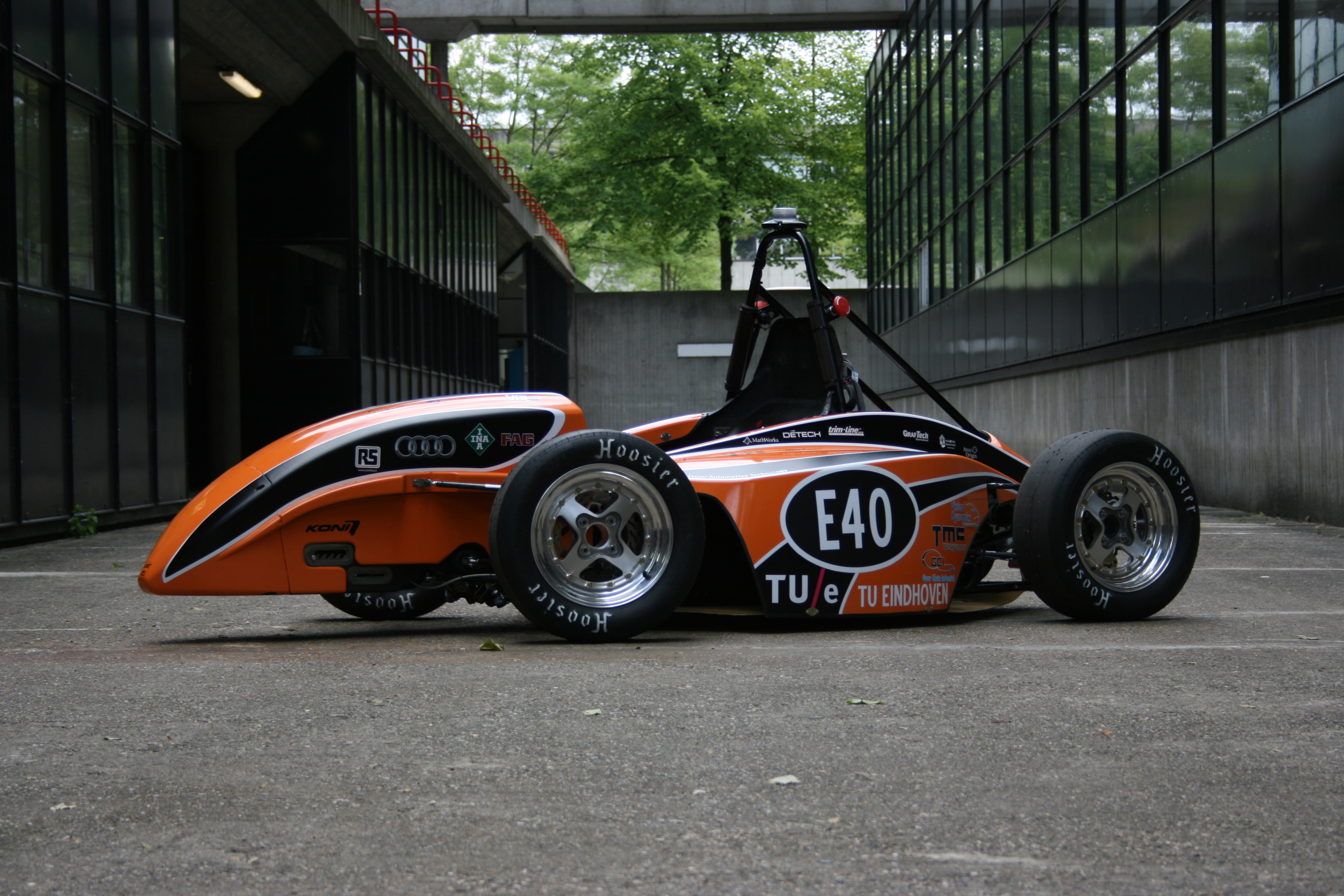
The fully electric Formula Student car developed and built by 60 students of the Eindhoven University of Technology

On 3 January 2011, the university's plans for the period up to 2020, the "Strategic Plan 2020", was presented. The plan included establishing a University College with relevance in engineering education; establishing a Graduate School to manage the graduate programs; increasing the student body and annual PhDs awarded by 50 percent; increasing knowledge "valorisation" (practical usage) to a campus-wide score of 4.2; increasing the international position of the university to the top 100; and improving the campus, including adding a costly science park.

== Organization ==
As a public university of the Netherlands, TU/e's general structure and management is determined by the Wet op het Hoger Onderwijs en Wetenschappelijk Onderzoek (Law on Higher Education and Scientific Research). Between that law and the statutes of the university itself, the management of the university is organized according to the following chart:

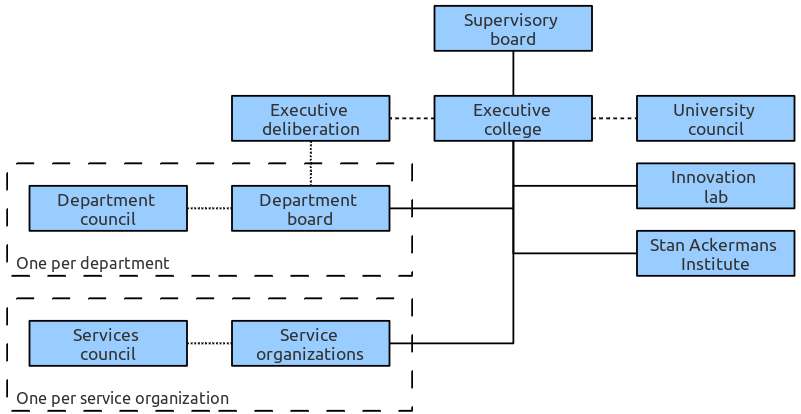
Organization chart of the TU/e management

=== Executive board ===
The day-to-day running of the university is in the hands of the executive board (College van Bestuur). The executive board (EB) monitors the academic departments and service organizations, in addition to the local activities of the Stan Ackermans Institute. The EB consists of the president, the rector magnificus, and the vice president, in addition to a secretary for clerical tasks, who is usually the secretary of the entire university. The rector magnificus is the only member of the EB whose membership is mandated by law. The law allows anyone to be appointed rector, but in practice the university appoints a former department dean as rector. The rector represents the university's academic staff and academic interests of the university. The current president is Koen Janssen, the rector is Silvia Lenaerts, the vice president is Patrick Groothuis, and the secretary is Eric van der Geer-Rutten-Rijswijk.

=== Oversight of the executive board ===
There are two bodies that supervise the Executive Board:

- The Supervisory Board is an external board of five people appointed by the Minister of Education (one member is appointed, based on a nomination by the University Council). This Board provides external oversight of the running of the university, including changing of the statutes, the budget, and other strategic decisions.
- The University Council is a council of 18 people, half of whom are elected from the university staff (academic and otherwise) and half from the student body. The University Council is informed of the running of the university by the executive board at least twice a year and may advise the EB as it sees fit. It guards against discrimination within the university, and the council must agree to any changes in the management structure. The Council membership is open to all students and personnel, except the University Secretary and anyone in the supervisory board or the executive board.

=== Departments and service organizations ===
Most of the work at the university is done in the departments and service organizations. In both the departments and the service organizations, the staff (and students) are involved with the running of the body. Both the bodies also have advisory councils.

The departments take care of most of the research and education at the university. Each department is run by its professors and headed by a dean. The deans are all members of the executive deliberation meeting, which is a regular meeting of the deans and the rector.

The service organizations are involved in further activities that are part of running the university.

The university has the following service organizations:

Organization	Full name	Purpose
DAZ	General Affairs Service (Dienst Algemene Zaken)	Organizational and secretarial functions for varied activities, the alumni organization and the Student Sport Center
CEC	Communications Expertise Center (Communicatie Expertise Centrum)	Responsible for all university communications and announcements, including interacting with the press and communications regarding external billing and payments. CEC also handles the printing and distribution of university brochures, and oversees uniform application of the university's house style.
DPO	Human Resources Management (Dienst Personeel en Organisatie)	All HR-related activities, including vacancies, pension plans, regulations about health and workplace safety, and specific tax breaks.
DFEZ	Financial and Economic Services (Dienst Financiële en Economische Zaken)	University finances.
DH	Housing service (Dienst Huisvesting)	Management of all real estate belonging to the university
ICT	ICT Service (Dienst ICT)	Management of university computers, student laptops, networks, network security, shared storage facilities, university SharePoint sites, in addition to making related codes of conduct.
IEC	Information Expertise Center (Informatie Expertise Centrum)	The university library (both physical and digital).
DIZ	Internal Affairs Service (Dienst Interne Zaken)	Internal services, such as emergency assistance for events like fires and heart attacks, logistics, purchasing, and managing contracts.
STU	Student Service Center (Onderwijs en Studenten Service Centrum)	Responsible for student services such as admission and registries, information for highschool and future students, and laptop service.
GTD	Common Technical Service (Gemeenschappelijke Technische Dienst)	Provides technical services to departments, such as building prototypes, experiments, specific machinery, and software.

=== TU/e Holding B.V. ===
TU/e is involved in commercial interests and off-campus ties. These include commercial agreements between the university and external companies, in addition to interests in spinoff companies. In 1997 the TU/e Holding B.V., a limited company, was created to manage these commercial interests.

== Academics ==
=== Rankings ===
University rankings

Global – Overall
- ARWU World: 401–500 (2024)
- QS World: =140 (2026)
- THE World: =185 (2025)
- USNWR Global: =374 (2025)

As of 2018, Eindhoven was ranked between 51 and 141 in the world (the university itself provides a survey), and a top ten technical university in Europe.

Year	THE Ranking (Change)	QS Ranking (Change)
2005	70	–
2006	67 (▲3)	–
2007	130 (▼63)	–
2008	128 (▲2)	–
2009	120 (▲8)	–
2010	114 (▲6)	126
2010-11	115 (▼1)	146 (▼20)
2012-13	114 (▲1)	158 (▼12)
2013-14	106 (▲8)	157 (▲1)
2014-15	144 (▼38) overall, Engineering and Technology 64	147 (▲10)
2015-16	176 (▼32) overall, Engineering and Technology 62 (▼2), Physical sciences 86	117 (▲30)
2016-17	177 (▼1) overall, Engineering and Technology 64 (▲2), Computer Science 75	121 (▼4)
2017-18	141 (▲36) overall, Engineering and Technology 51 (▲13), Computer Science 64	104 (▲17)
2018-19	167 (▼26) overall, Engineering and Technology 69 (▲18), Computer Science 74	99 (▼5)
2019-20	186 (▼19) overall, Engineering and Technology 73 (▲4)	99
2020-21	187 (▲1) overall, Engineering and Technology 63 (▼10)	102 (▲3)
2021-22	201-250 (▼ approx) overall, Engineering and Technology 62 (▼1)	120 (▲18)
2022-23	201-250 overall, Engineering and Technology 81 (▲19)	125 (▲5)
2023-24	168 (▲ approx) overall, Engineering and Technology 84 (▲3)	138 (▲13)
2024-25	185 (▼17) overall, Engineering and Technology 81 (▼3)	124 (▼14)
2025-26	192 (▼7) overall, Engineering and Technology 84 (▲3)	140 (▲16)

In a 2003 European Commission report, TU/e was ranked as third among European research universities (after Cambridge and Oxford, tied with TU Munich and thus tied for the highest ranked Technical University in Europe), based on the impact of its scientific research. In the 2011 ARWU (Academic Ranking of World Universities) rankings, TU/e was placed at the 52-75 bracket internationally in the Engineering/Technology and Computer Science (ENG) category and at 34th place internationally in the Computer Science subject field.

=== Education ===
The scientific departments (or faculties) are the main divisions involved in teaching and research in the university. They employ the majority of the academic staff, are responsible for teaching the students, and sponsor the research schools and institutions.

The departments also offer PhD programs (promotiefase) for qualified masters. Unlike in Anglo-Saxon countries, the PhD program is not educational, rather, the university employs those aiming for a PhD as researchers.

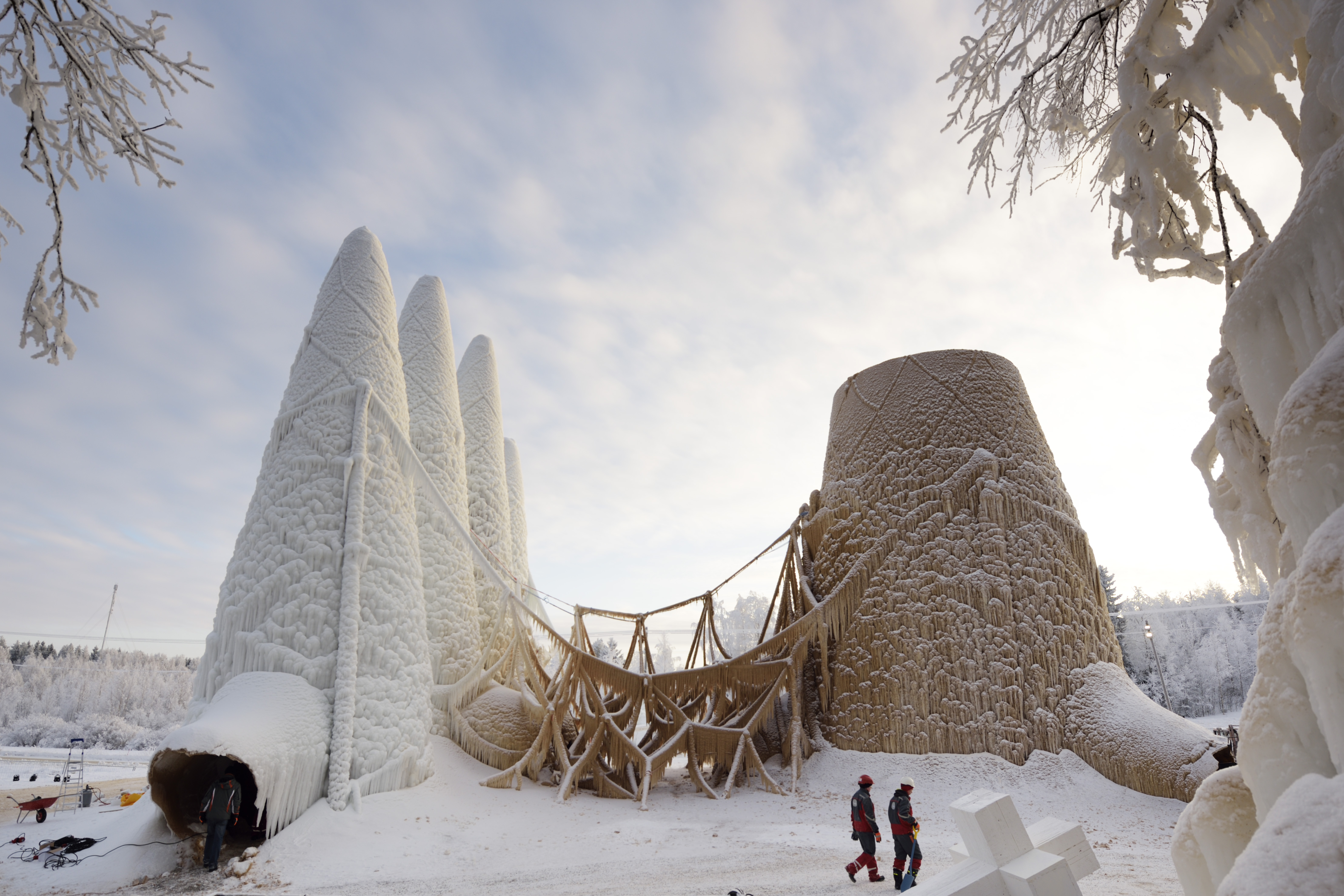
Sagrada Família replica built in ice composite by TU/e Master students of the Built Environment faculty in Juuka, 2015

The TU/e has nine departments:

- Biomedical Engineering
- Built Environment
- Electrical engineering
- Industrial Design
- Chemical Engineering and Chemistry
- Industrial Engineering & Innovation Sciences (formerly Technology Management)
- Applied Physics
- Mechanical Engineering
- Mathematics and Computer science

All education in each department is conducted solely in English, with the exception of the Biomedical Engineering department, which is conducted in a hybrid of both Dutch and English, however, primarily in Dutch. As a result, a Dutch language requirement applies alongside English.

==== Honors programs ====
The university offers honors programs for both bachelor and master students. At the bachelor level it consists of intensive study within eight possible tracks. At the master level it consists of extra leadership and professional development work.

==== Postgraduate doctorate of engineering (PDEng) ====
In 1986, the university, together with two other Dutch technological universities (TU Delft and University of Twente), started various programs for earning a postgraduate doctorate of engineering (PDEng). These programs are managed by the Stan Ackermans Institute on behalf of the 4TU Federation. Nationally, 3,500 students have earned the postgraduate PDEng degree through these programs. There are ten programs at TU/e, each two years long.

- Automotive Systems Design
- Clinical Informatics
- Data Science
- Healthcare Systems Design
- Information and Communication Technology
- Process and Product Design
- Qualified Medical Engineer
- Smart Buildings and Cities
- Software Technology
- User-System Interaction

==== Other educational programs ====
The university hosts a number of other educational programs that are in some way related to the main educational programs. These include the teacher's program and an MBA program.

- Eindhoven School of Education: Teacher's education for masters, to get a higher education teaching certificate. Also involves research into education.
- TIAS School for Business and Society: A shared MBA program with the University of Tilburg, for university graduates.
- HBO minor program: Bachelor programs for students of HBO universities (four-year bachelor programs), to gain access to the master programs.

=== International connections ===
The TU/e has connections with sister institutions in different countries, for example:

- National University of Singapore in Singapore
- Zhejiang University, Shanghai Jiao Tong University, Fudan University, and Northeastern University in China
- Georgia Institute of Technology, Northwestern University, Carnegie Mellon University in the US
- RMIT University in Australia
- Middle East Technical University in Turkey
- Katholieke Universiteit Leuven in Belgium

The TU/e also provides education to foreign students and graduates. According to the 2009 annual report in the academic year 2008–2009 there were 490 exchange students, 103 foreign nationals registered in a bachelor program, 430 in a master program, 158 in a professional doctorate program (79% of the total). In 2009 the university employed 37 foreign professors (15.9% of the total) and 16 foreign associate professors (12.8%). Overall, 29.5% of the university staff was non-Dutch.

As of 2011/2012, the TU/e had Erasmus agreements with universities in 30 countries across Europe in a range of subjects for student exchanges.

== Regional effect ==
The TU/e plays a role in the academic, economic and social life of Eindhoven and the surrounding region.

The TU/e is important to the economy of the Eindhoven region, as well as the wider areas of BrabantStad and the Samenwerkingsverband Regio Eindhoven. It provides skilled labor for local businesses and partners with technology companies in the area.

=== Regional history ===
The university's role in the economy started with the interaction with the Philips company. The university was founded primarily to address Philips's need for local employees with higher levels of education in electronics, physics, chemistry and later computer science. Later that interest spread to DAF and Royal Dutch Shell. Often, senior personnel from these companies were hired to form the academic staff of the university (an Eindhoven joke was said that the university trains the engineers and Philips trains the professors).

The relationship changed during the 1980s and 1990s as Philips moved away from the region. The university was forced to seek closer ties with the city of Eindhoven, resulting in the Brainport initiative, a move to draw high tech industry to the region. The university started expending more effort in making practical use of its research and providing support for local companies and startups.

=== Current effect ===
The TU/e is host (and in some cases also commissioner) of a number of research schools, including the ESI and the DPI. These research schools are a source of knowledge for tech companies in the area such as ASML, NXP and FEI. As of summer 2010, the TU/e was also host to the Eindhoven Energy Institute (EEI), a co-location of the European Institute of Innovation and Technology's KIC on Sustainable Energy (InnoEnergy). The university also plays a large role in providing knowledge and personnel to other companies in the High Tech Campus Eindhoven and helps support startups through the Eindhoven Twinning Center and The Gate. The valorisation of TU/e has led to various spin-offs, including Lusoco, NC Biomatrix, Taylor, SMART Photonics, EFFECT Photonics and MicroAlign.

In the extended region, the TU/e is a part of the Eindhoven-Leuven-Aachen triangle. The agreement between these three cities from three different countries formed a region that is among the highest in the European Union in terms of investment in technology and knowledge economy. The agreement includes cooperation between the three technical universities in the cities.

== Student life ==
=== Community ===
The TU/e has over 110 community bodies for its members. They are related to sports, culture, faith, staff, international students and hobbies, as well as university political parties, student teams, and study associations for each faculty.

=== Technological sports ===
In addition to the regular sports played by the students and staff, the university has some "technology sporting efforts". Some examples include:

Robot football
In 2010, TechUnited, the university's robot football team, won the European Championship, came second for the third time in a row at the world championship in Singapore and won the world championship in 2012. The team is part of the Mid-Size league of RoboCup.

Auto racing
The TU/e's race team, University Racing Eindhoven (URE) competes annually in the Formula Student and other races with self-built racers. Starting in 2010 the team switched from a petrol engine to an electric car; this car came third at Silverstone, second at Hockenheim and won the Formula Student in its first year.

The university also has another race team, Solar Team Eindhoven (STE), that has entered cars named Stella into the biannual World Solar Challenge since 2013, winning the Cruiser class competition both in 2013 and 2015.

Another student racing program is the Automotive Technology InMotion team, a collaboration between the TU/e and Fontys University of Applied Sciences. The team has the aim to compete in the 2020 24 Hours of Le Mans.

=== Student teams ===
TU/e has various student teams which work on problems in the fields of sustainability, artificial intelligence, health and mobility.

== Notable people ==
=== Notable alumni ===
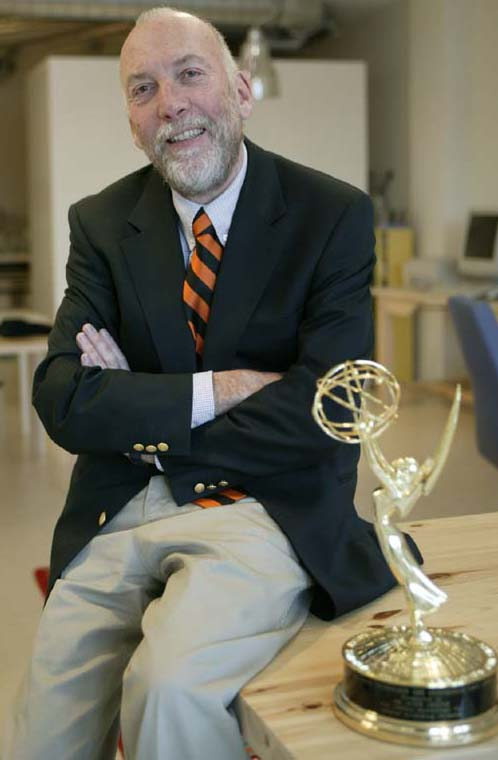
Kees Schouhamer Immink

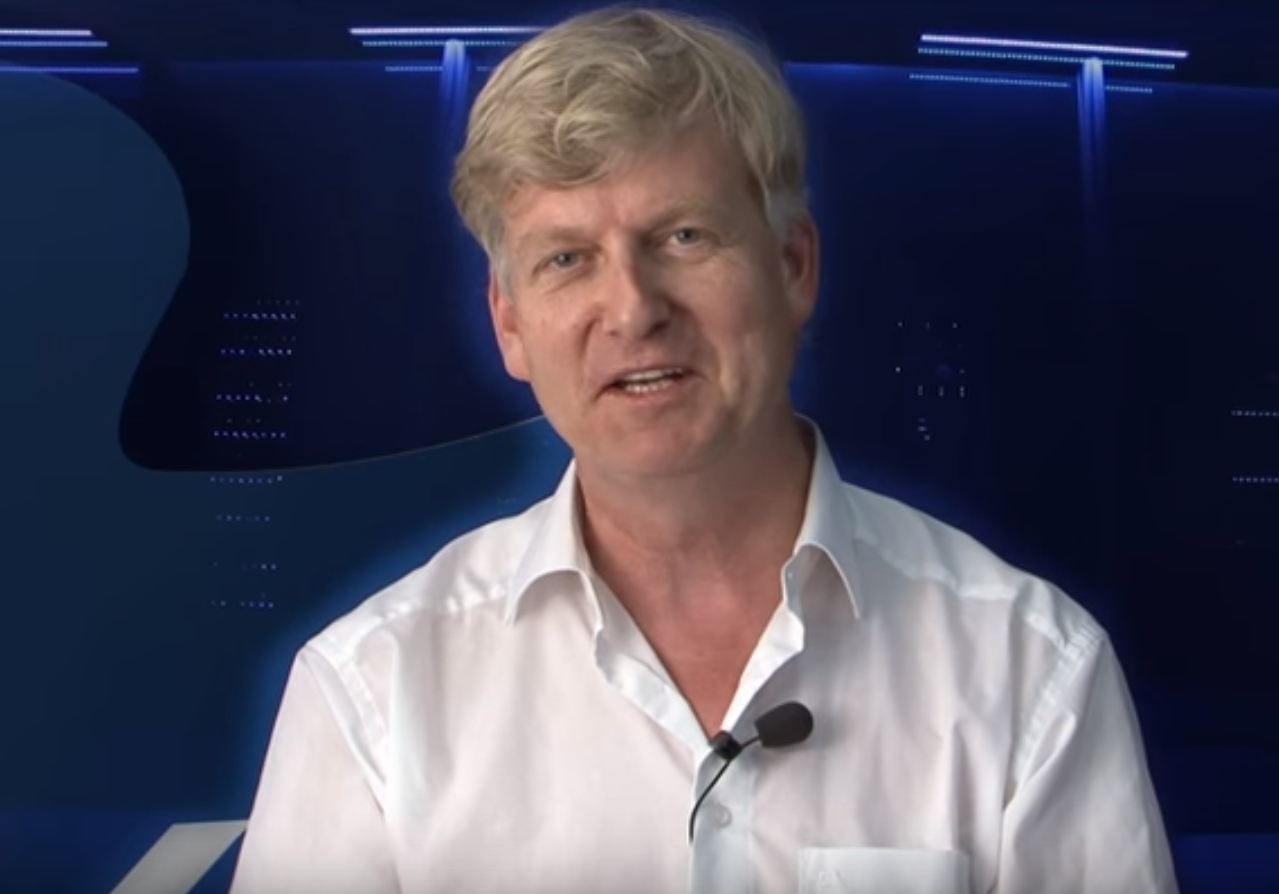
Wil van der Aalst.

- Wil van der Aalst, Dutch computer scientist
- Stefan Bon, chemical engineer at the University of Warwick
- Jo Coenen, Dutch architect and former Chief Architect of the Netherlands
- Martijn van Dam, member of the House of Representatives (2006–10, 2010–12)
- Marijn Dekkers, Chairman of Unilever
- Jan Dietz, Dutch computer scientist
- Teun van Dijck, member of the House of Representatives (2006–10, 2010–12)
- Susan Doniz, senior executive with Disney
- Camiel Eurlings, Dutch Minister of Transport, Public Works and Water Management (2006–2010)
- Gerard Kleisterlee, Chairman of Vodafone and a former president and chief executive officer of Royal Philips Electronics
- Arno Kuijlaars, mathematician, professor at the Katholieke Universiteit Leuven
- G.M. Nijssen, Dutch computer scientist
- Itay Noy, Israeli watchmaker
- Ralf Mackenbach, singer
- Kees Schouhamer Immink, president Turing Machines Inc, digital pioneer, winner Emmy Award, recipient IEEE Medal of Honor
- Sjoerd Soeters, architect
- René van Zuuk, Dutch architect

=== Notable faculty ===
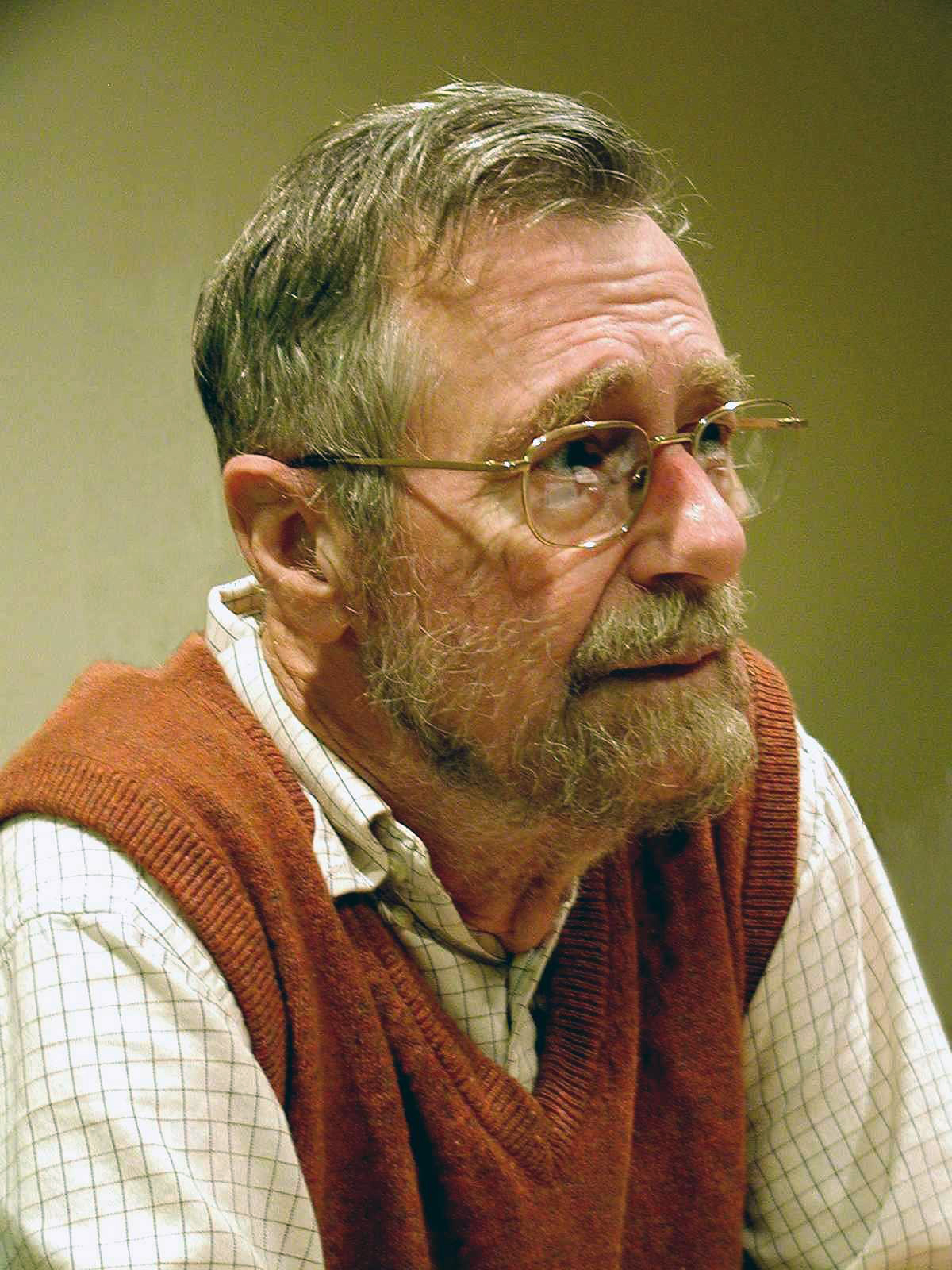
Edsger W. Dijkstra

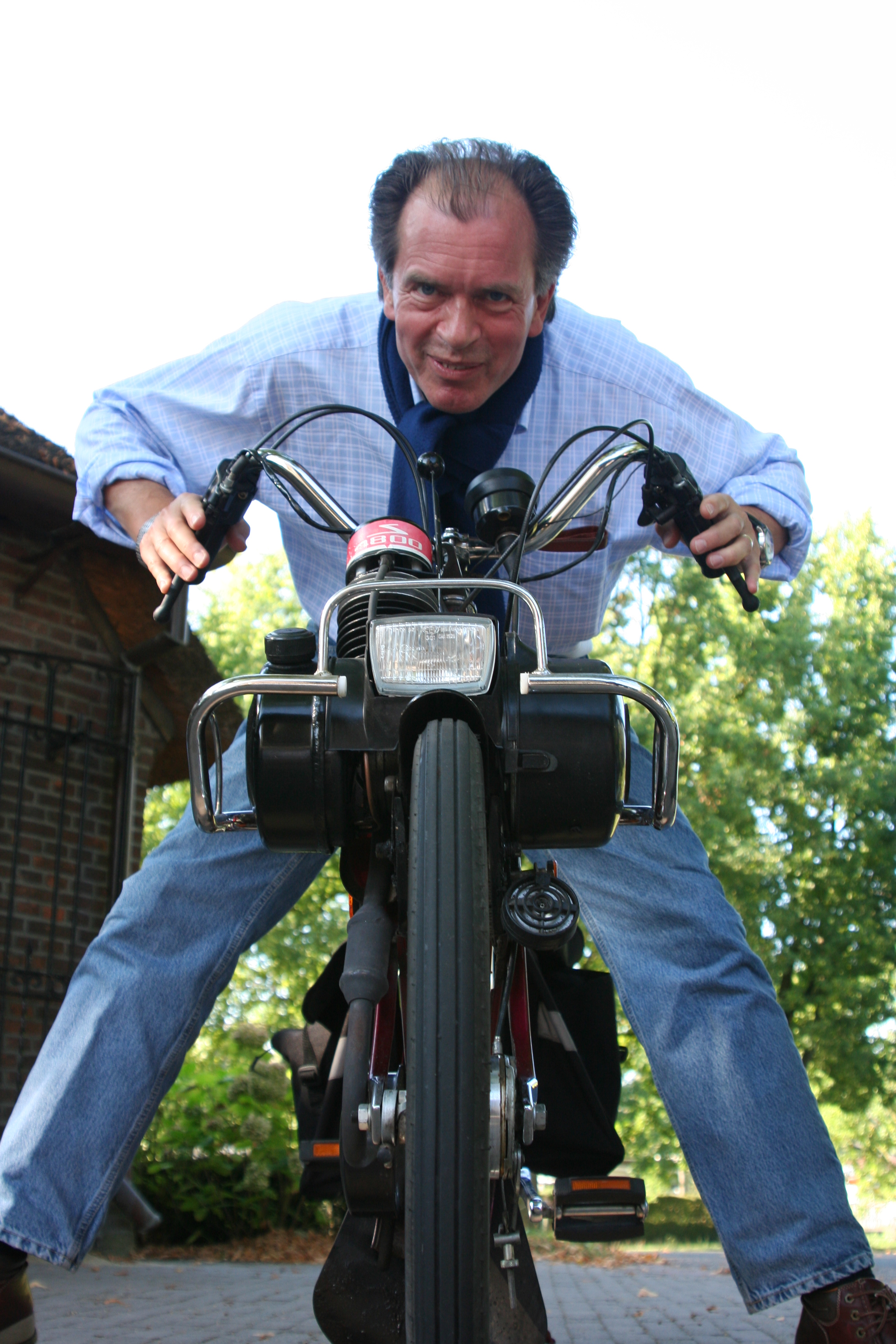
Harry Lintsen

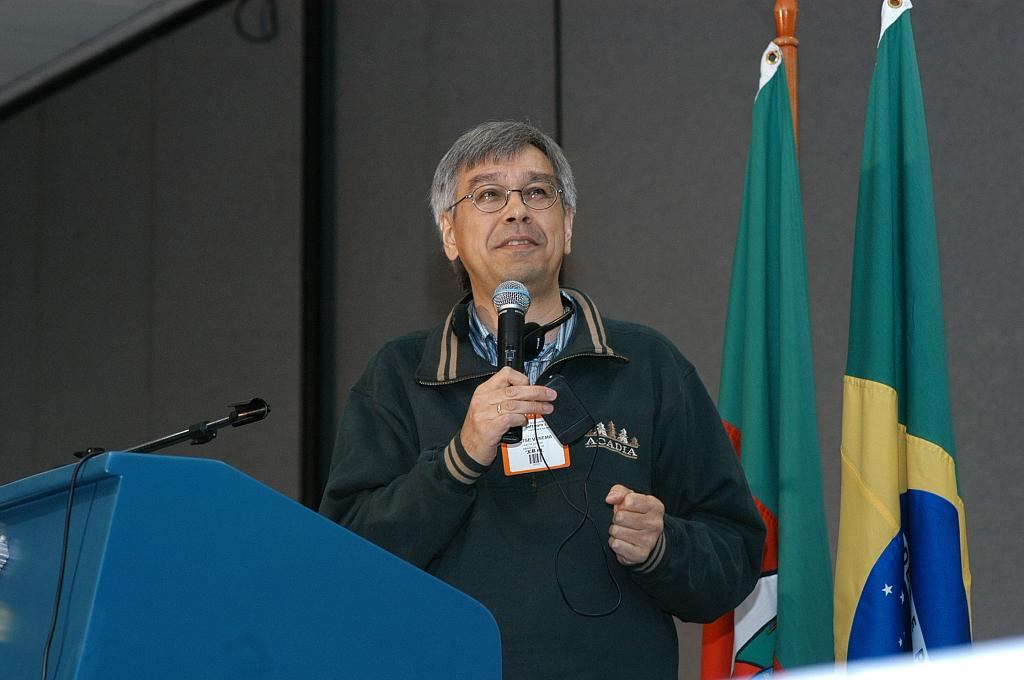
Wietse Venema

- Jacques Benders, mathematician
- Andries Brouwer, mathematician and computer programmer
- Nicolaas Govert de Bruijn, mathematician
- Henk Buck, professor of chemistry
- Jo Coenen, Dutch architect and former Chief Architect of the Netherlands
- Henk Dorgelo, physicist and first rector magnificus
- Edsger W. Dijkstra, mathematician and computer scientist, Turing Award winner 1972
- Hugo Christiaan Hamaker, physicist
- Hubert-Jan Henket, architect
- Alexandre Horowitz, mechanical engineer; inventor of the Philishave
- Arie Andries Kruithof, physicist, discovered the Kruithofeffect and Kruithofcurve
- Piet Lemstra, inventor of the Dyneema fibre
- Jack van Lint, mathematician
- Harry Lintsen, historian in technology history, former chairman Foundation for the History of Technology
- Archer Martin, Fellow of the Royal Society, 1952 Nobel laureate in chemistry (professor TU/e 1964–1974)
- Bert Meijer, chemical engineer, pioneer in polymer research
- Jaime Gómez Rivas, Physicist
- Sjoerd Romme, professor of Entrepreneurship & Innovation
- Johan Schot, historian, professor of technology history
- Bettina Speckmann, computer scientist
- Piet Steenkamp, lawyer, co-founder of the CDA
- Martinus Tels, chemical engineer, rector magnificus, pioneer of waste management processes in the Netherlands
- Wietse Venema, programmer and physicist

=== Notable honors for research done at the university ===
- prof. dr. ir.René de Borst: Spinozapremie (1999)
- prof. dr. Bert Meijer: KNCV Gold Medal (1993), Arthur K. Doolittle Award (1995), Spinozapremie (2001), Wheland Medal 2010/2011
- prof.dr.ir. René Janssen: KIvI/NIRIA Speurwerkprijs 2010, Spinozapremie (2015)
- prof. dr.ir. Jaap Schouten: Simon Stevin Master 2006
- prof. dr. ir. Jan van Hest: Spinozapremie (2020)
