= Nucleosides, Nucleotides & Nucleic Acids =

- Discipline: Biochemistry
- Language: English
- Edited by: John A. Secrist III

Publication details
- History: 2000–present
- Publisher: Taylor & Francis (Informa Healthcare) (England)
- Frequency: Monthly
- Impact factor: 1.167 (2018)

Standard abbreviations
- ISO 4: Nucleosides Nucleotides Nucleic Acids

Indexing
- ISSN: 1525-7770 (print); 1532-2335 (web)
- LCCN: sn99004347
- OCLC no.: 41669733

Links
- Journal homepage; International Society on Nucleosides, Nucleotides and Nucleic Acids; The Purine and Pyrimidine Society

Nucleosides, Nucleotides & Nucleic Acids is a monthly academic journal published by Taylor & Francis since 2000, continuing the earlier Nucleosides and Nucleotides in series. It discusses topics relating to the biochemistry of molecules in these classes.
