= Jaime Gómez Rivas =

Spanish physicist

- Occupations: Physicist and an academic

Academic background
- Education: M.S., Astrophysics (1995); Ph.D. (2002)
- Alma mater: Universidad Complutense de Madrid; Université de Liége; Universiteit van Amsterdam

Academic work
- Institutions: Eindhoven University of Technology

Jaime Gómez Rivas is a Spanish physicist and an academic. He is a professor at Eindhoven University of Technology.

Rivas is most known for his physics research, primarily focusing on nanophotonics and terahertz optics. His work has been published in academic journals, including Light: Science & Applications and Materials today. He holds multiple patents. Moreover, he is the recipient of 2016 Facebook Academy Award for his work on plasmonics.

== Education ==
Rivas earned his Master's in Physics with a specialization in Astrophysics from Universidad Complutense de Madrid and Université de Liége in 1995. Later, he completed his Ph.D. from the Universiteit van Amsterdam in 2002.

== Career ==
From 1997 to 2001, Rivas held a position as a research associate at Universiteit van Amsterdam to perform a PhD. Following this, between 2002 and 2005, he served as the project leader for THz Plasmonics as well as postdoctoral researcher at the Institute of Semiconductor Technology at RWTH-Aachen University. There, his group pioneered the field of semiconductor THz plasmonics. From 2005 to 2015, he assumed the role of project leader (2005–2009) and group leader (2009–2015) for the Nanowire Photonics Group at the FOM Institute for Atomic and Molecular Physics (AMOLF) in Amsterdam. Between 2005 and 2015, he also led the Surface Photonics Group embedded at Philips Research in Eindhoven, where he introduced the concept of plasmonics and nanoantennas for solid-state lighting. Concurrently, he held a part-time professorship in surface photonics at Eindhoven University of Technology. Subsequently, he served as a full professor of surface photonics and THz physics at the same institution from 2016 to 2019. Since September 2019, he has held the positions of full professor and group leader of the Surface Photonics Group, as well as the capacity group leader of the Photonics and Semiconductor Nanophysics group at Eindhoven University of Technology. He cofounded TeraNova in 2019, an spin-off company dedicated to the development and commercialization of optical metrology systems. From 2015 until 2024, he has served as associate editor of the Journal of Applied Physics, published by the American Institute of Physics. In 2026, he was appointed Associate Editor of Optica, one of the leading scientific journals in optics and photonics, published by Optica Publishing Group.

== Research ==
Rivas, in his early research focused on light propagation through strongly scattering media and Anderson localization of light. In his 1999 work, he explored the fundamental physics of light–matter interaction within disordered scattering materials, such as polydisperse semiconductor powders and porous layers.

In 2003, Rivas' research delved into the resonant tunneling of surface-plasmon polaritons (SPPs) through doped semiconductors at terahertz frequencies, revealing enhanced transmission through subwavelength apertures, showcasing sharp resonances and notably improved transmission efficacy over classical diffraction transmission.

Rivas' 2007 collaborative research with OL Muskens, JA Sanchez and others explored how resonant optical nanoantennas can significantly enhance the radiative decay rate of fluorescent dye molecules, resulting in improved internal quantum efficiency, as demonstrated through experimental observation and theoretical validation. His 2009 research explored the interplay between nanoengineered arrays of nanoparticles that support collective resonances, known as surface lattice resonances, and fluorescent molecules to manipulate light emission at the nanoscale.

Rivas' 2011 research presented an advancement in plasmonic nanoparticle sensor performance, achieving over tenfold improvement in sensitivity by exploiting diffractive coupling of localized surface plasmon resonances to create narrow linewidth Fano resonances for precise refractive index detection. While investigating the integration of high quantum efficiency emitters with plasmonic nanoantennas, his 2013 work demonstrated a substantial improvement in light emission from extended sources by achieving over 70-fold directional enhancement for p-polarized emission and 60-fold enhancement for unpolarized emission, paving the way for new research directions in solid-state lighting. In 2013, he delved into the utilization of metal nanoparticle arrays for strong light-matter coupling, exploring how molecular electronic transitions interact with electromagnetic fields to form hybrid light-matter states. This investigation led to the demonstration of polariton lasing and condensation at room temperature, and enhanced exciton propagation. His later work examined bound states in the continuum (optical modes without any loss) both in the visible and at THz frequencies.

== Awards and honors ==
- 2011 – Starting Grant and Proof of Concept Grant, European Research Council
- 2016 – Facebook Academy Award for Solid State Lighting, Facebook
- 2016 – Excellent Publication Award, Light Science & Applications
- 2026 – Ranked as one of the 100 most influential Spaniards shaping the global knowledge economy by the Instituto Choiseul España

== Selected articles ==
- Muskens, O. L., Giannini, V., Sánchez-Gil, J. A., & Gómez Rivas, J. (2007). Strong enhancement of the radiative decay rate of emitters by single plasmonic nanoantennas. Nano letters, 7(9), 2871–2875.
- Vecchi, G., Giannini, V., & Rivas, J. G. (2009). Shaping the fluorescent emission by lattice resonances in plasmonic crystals of nanoantennas. Physical review letters, 102(14), 146807.
- Lozano, G., Louwers, D. J., Rodríguez, S. R., Murai, S., Jansen, O. T., Verschuuren, M. A., & Gómez Rivas, J. (2013). Plasmonics for solid-state lighting: enhanced excitation and directional emission of highly efficient light sources. Light: Science & Applications, 2(5), e66-e66.
- M. Ramezani; A. Halpin; A.I. Fernandez; J. Feist; S.R.K. Rodriguez; F.J. Garcia-Vidal; J. Gómez Rivas, Plasmon-exciton-polariton lasing, Optica 4 (2017) 31–37
- Wang, W., Ramezani, M., Väkeväinen, A. I., Törmä, P., Rivas, J. G., & Odom, T. W. (2018). The rich photonic world of plasmonic nanoparticle arrays. Materials today, 21(3), 303–314.
