= Jaime Gómez Velásquez =

Colombian trade unionist

Jaime Gomez Velasquez
- Born: Jaime Enrique Gomez Velasquez; October 20, 1950; Bogotá, Colombia
- Died: c. April 2006; Bogotá, Colombia
- Occupations: trade unionist, historian and political scientist
- Relatives: Diana Marcela Gómez; Juan Sebastián Gómez

Jaime Enrique Gómez Velásquez (October 20, 1950 – c. April 2006) was a Colombian trade unionist, historian and political scientist. He was a former president of Sintrateléfonos - The labor union for telecommunications workers in Bogotá. He was also Councillor of Bogotá, a university professor, and advisor to social movements. Gomez disappeared for 34 days, was tortured and murdered in 2006, when he was part of the work team of former senator Piedad Córdoba. Although it is presumed that Paramilitaries and agents of the Colombian State were involved, investigations have only been able to prove details surrounding the murder after Velásquez's disappearance.

== Childhood and early political activity ==
Jaime Enrique was born on October 20, 1950 into the heart of a large family from Bogotá. He was the first of the eight children from parents Ana Elvia and Luis Enrique. Jaime grew up in the district of Kennedy, southwest of Bogotá, a place that would later become one of his political strongholds.

In 1969 at the age of 19, he was hired as a worker by the Telecommunication Company of Bogotá (ETB) where his contact and daily work with his compañeros (or, more neutral, fellow workers) brought him closer to the problems of workers and other employees and into contact with Sintrateléfonos, a trade union organization whose operation and orientation was controlled by militants of the traditional parties, until that time mainly by the Colombian Conservative Party.

Gómez Velásquez, began to excel as a member of the organization and was building a political criterion that led him to join the critics of the Left against the National Front, a bipartisan conservative-liberal experiment that nullified political competition and legitimized the exclusion of other sectors.

Later, in congruence with his political stance, Jaime Gómez became a member and activist in the Movimiento Obrero Independiente y Revolucionario, a leftist Maoist party, which at the time had a strong organizational structure, a large number of members and a strong influence on the core of popular, union and community organizations.

== Activist, negotiator and leader of the workers ==
As his political influence consolidated, Gómez managed to bring together divergent sectors and brought the union massively into the streets. During the month of August and September, prior to the 1977 Civic Strike, Gómez led Sintrateléfonos as an independent union (not affiliated to any of the 4 labor centers) to strike and managed to call a group of more than 5,000 people who joined the cessation of activities and the marches that flooded the streets of the city between September 14 and 20, 1977.

Following the success of the mobilisation, in 1979 Jaime Gomez was elected president of the ETB union Sintrateléfonos, with the highest voter turnout in the history of the organization. He served in this position over several terms and transformed the union completely. Gomez led a radical shift on its agenda and political orientation.

For more than a decade, and at a time of the rise of trade unions as social movements in the twentieth century, Jaime was a leader and negotiator on numerous occasions of Collective Conventions that brought the company into negotiation with the union. On several occasions, in the context of the difficult repressive environment of the time, as well as his fellow leaders of the unions of the Bogotá companies Empresa de Acueducto de Bogotá, Empresa de Energía de Bogotá, Banco Agrario de Colombia and Telefónica Colombia, among others; Jaime suffered threats, intimidation and persecution.

== Resignation of the MOIR and creation of the Unitary Workers Confederation ==
In 1981, together with a significant group of leaders of the labor and trade union movement, amidst intense debates and contradictions, Gómez decided to leave the MOIR and actively join the project for a larger trade union. He took part of the group of leaders who gave life to the Colombian Central Union of Workers (CUT) in February 1986. Later that year on November the 15th Gomez joined the other 1,800 delegates, who on behalf of 45 federations and about 600 unions, met in Bogotá to sign the declaration of principles and give life to the largest Trade union confederation for workers in Colombia. Subsequently, he studied and finished his Education at Universidad Javeriana also in Bogotá.
