= Newton International Fellowship =

Postdoctoral research fellowship in the UK for a non-UK scientist

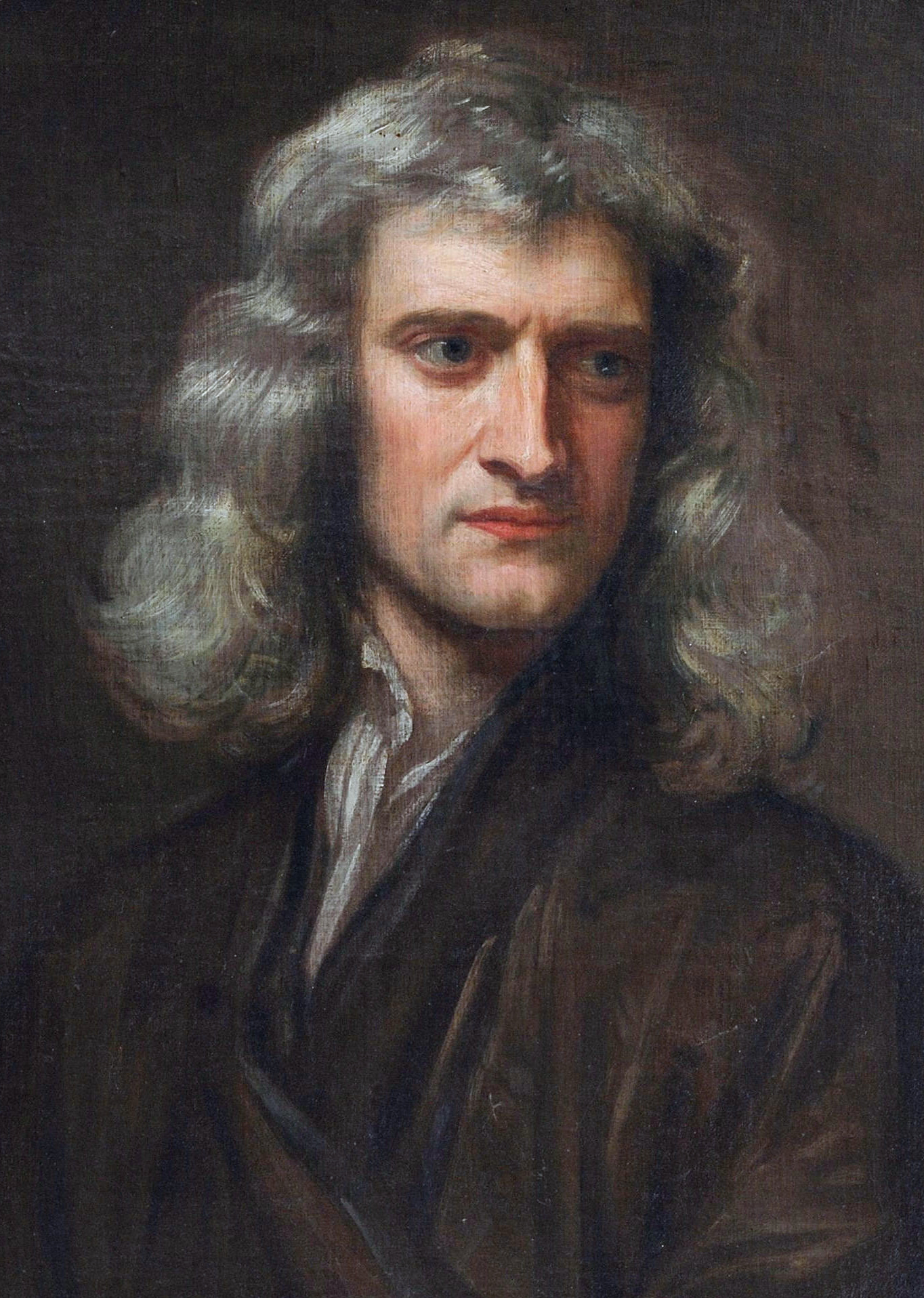
Sir Isaac Newton FRS (1642–1727) was President of the Royal Society from 1723 until his death.

The Newton International Fellowship, named after Sir Isaac Newton, is an international postdoctoral award for selected foreign academics to carry out research at institutions in the United Kingdom.

== Award description ==
Established by the Royal Society, British Academy, and Royal Academy of Engineering, the Fellowships are awarded annually to approximately 25 of the most outstanding early career academics from across the world, in all disciplines of the sciences and humanities. Key objectives of the Newton Fellowship are to bring the best early career academics to the UK and to enhance ties between these academics' home countries and the UK. Newton Fellows are fully funded for a period of three years and awarded coverage of research expenses up to £8,000 per year, with a maximum award value since 2023 of £420,000. This award is intended to facilitate the development of a continuous research program and to support continued engagement with UK-based researchers.

== Criteria ==
Applicants to the Fellowship must not hold UK citizenship and must be working outside the UK at the time of the application. It is required that applicants hold a PhD by the time the funding starts. Applicants should have no more than 7 years of active full-time postdoctoral experience at the time of application (discounting career breaks, but including teaching experience and/or time spent in industry).
