= 4TU =

Group of 4 leading Dutch universities of technology

- Formation: February 7, 2007; 19 years ago
- Secretary General: Dr. ir. Marjolein Dohmen-Jansse
- Website: www.4tu.nl
- Formerly called: 3TU

4TU (stylized as 4TU.Federation) is the federation of the four Dutch universities of technology:

- Delft University of Technology (TU Delft)
- Eindhoven University of Technology (TU/e)
- University of Twente (UT)
- Wageningen University and Research Centre (WUR)

It was founded in 2007 as 3TU and was renamed to 4TU in 2016, in response to the entry of WUR.

The federation aims at maximizing innovation by concentrating the strengths in research, education and knowledge transfer of all technical universities in the Netherlands.

== Master Programmes ==
The three universities of technology in Delft, Eindhoven, and Enschede are jointly committed to strengthening and pooling technological knowledge with the aim of producing sufficient and well-trained engineers and technical designers, of carrying out outstanding and socially relevant research of an international standard, and of promoting cooperation between research institutes and businesses. The following joint master's degree courses are currently available:

- Construction Management & Engineering
- Embedded Systems
- Science Education & Communication
- Sustainable Energy Technology
- Systems & Control
- Cyber Security

== Institutes ==
=== Stan Ackermans Institute ===
4TU.School for Technological Design, Stan Ackermans Institute
- Established: 1986
- Location: Delft, Eindhoven, and Enschede
- Website: www.4tu.nl/sai

The 4TU.School for Technological Design, Stan Ackermans Institute (4TU.SAI) was started in 1986 at TU/e; the name was chosen in honor of prof.dr. S.T.M. Ackermans, the rector magnificus of the university who retired the year before and who spent a good deal of his career lobbying for more attention in university education to the needs of the companies who would employ the graduates.

4TU.SAI manages different post-graduate technical designer programs across TU Delft, TU/e, and UT. Each designer program is two years in length and is intended to teach young masters starting in their careers the design skills needed to design the complex systems needed in the high tech industry. Graduates are granted a Professional Doctorate in Engineering degree and may use the postfix PDEng after their name.

The post-master programs offered by 4TU.SAI are:

- Automotive Systems Design (TU/e)
- Bioprocess Engineering (TUD)
- Business & IT (UT)
- Chemical Product Design (TUD)
- Civil Engineering (UT)
- Civil and Environmental Engineering (TUD)
- Clinical Informatics (TU/e)
- Data Science (TU/e)
- Design of Electrical Engineering Systems - Track Healthcare Systems Design (TU/e)
- Design of Electrical Engineering Systems - Track Information and Communication Technology (TU/e)
- Design and Technology of Instrumentation (TU/e)
- Energy & Process Technology (UT)
- Industrial Engineering (TU/e)
- Maintenance (UT)
- Process and Product Design (TU/e)
- Process and Equipment Design (TUD)
- Qualified Medical Engineer (TU/e)
- Robotics (UT)
- Smart Energy Buildings and Cities (TU/e)
- Software Technology (TU/e)
- User-System Interaction (TU/e)

=== Applied Mathematics Institute ===
The 3TU Applied Mathematics Institute (3TU.AMI) is one of the Centers of Excellence of the 3TU Federation. The AMI is dedicated to coordinating the activities of different applied mathematics groups at the three technical universities. These coordinated activities include the research, but also the master's programs, internships and knowledge valorisation. In the period 1990–2006, the joint MSC program graduated 1229 students.

On 23 September 2010, the 3TU Federation announced an extensive cooperative agreement with AMI's German counterpart, MATHEON. The cooperation will extend to shared master's programs, coordinated graduate schools, a European project for e-learning, a Dutch-German research program and an exchange program for professors. The AMI-MATHEON cooperation will encompass 80 professors and over 500 researchers; it will be the largest mathematics cluster in Europe.

=== 4TU.Centre for Research Data ===
4TU.Centre for Research Data (short name: 4TU.ResearchData) (formerly known as 3TU.Datacentrum) is a data archive for research data in science and engineering. The archive stores research data in a permanent and sustainable manner, according to the guidelines of the international Data Seal of Approval; it is listed in the Registry of Research Data Repositories re3data.org.

4TU.ResearchData is currently run by a consortium of three partners: TU Delft, TU Eindhoven and Twente University. The consortium is open to any organization that shares, and actively contributes to, the archive’s mission. It is part of the larger 4TU.Federation that comprises Delft, Eindhoven and Twente and also Wageningen University.

== See also ==
- Open access in the Netherlands
- TU9, a German federation of technical universities
