= Robot football =

Robot football is a sport organised by the Federation of International Robot-soccer Association. It aims to create a team of robots capable of beating a human side at football by 2050.

Robot football began in 1995 in Korea. From 1996 onwards, international championships have been held every year.

Brainstormers Tribots (from Universität Osnabrück) play RFC Stuttgart (from Universität Stuttgart) in the RoboCupSoccer Middle-Size League at the 2009 RoboCup German Open.

== Leagues ==
The leagues are as follows:

- HuroSot – humanoid robots up to 150 cm high and 30 kg in weight.
- KhperaSot – cylindrical autonomous robots with onboard vision systems.
- Mirosot – robots up to 75mm cube. 3, 5, 7 or 11 a-side.
- NaroSot – 4c square robots up to 5.5 cm high.
- Quadrosot – four-legged robots.
- SimuroSot – PC-based simulation over both 5-a-side and 11-a-side.

Robot football combines skills from all fields of engineering, from computer programming, to mechanical design. Robot football teams are usually found at universities as part of research projects.

The Robot Football World Cup was held in Singapore in December 2005.

RoboCup 2019 took place 2–8 July 2019 at the International Convention Centre, Sydney.
