= Professional Doctorate in Engineering =

Dutch doctorate degree

The Engineering Doctorate (EngD, previously Professional Doctorate in Engineering or PDEng) is a Dutch degree awarded to graduates of a Technological Designer (engineering) program that develop their students' capabilities to work within a professional context. These programs focus on applied techniques and design, in their respective engineering fields. The technological EngD designer programs were initiated at the request of the Dutch high-tech industry. High-tech companies need professionals who can design and develop complex new products and processes and offer innovative solutions. All programs work closely together with high-tech industry, offering trainees the opportunity to participate in large-scale, interdisciplinary design projects. With this cooperation, EngD programs provide trainees a valuable network of contacts in industry. Each program covers a different technological field, for example managing complex architectural construction projects, designing mechanisms for user interfaces for consumer products or developing high-tech software systems for software-intensive systems. Participation in a program that awards the abbreviation EngD requires either a Master's degree in a related field or an accredited B.Sc. degree (at least three years and 180 ECTS) in computer science (or a strongly related scientific or engineering discipline) combined with min. 5 years of relevant academic work experience.

PDEng degrees can be obtained at four technical Universities in the Netherlands, Delft University of Technology, Eindhoven University of Technology, University of Twente, and Wageningen University & Research. Between these universities interscholastic cooperation programs exist like the 4TU Federation and its Stan Ackermans Institute.

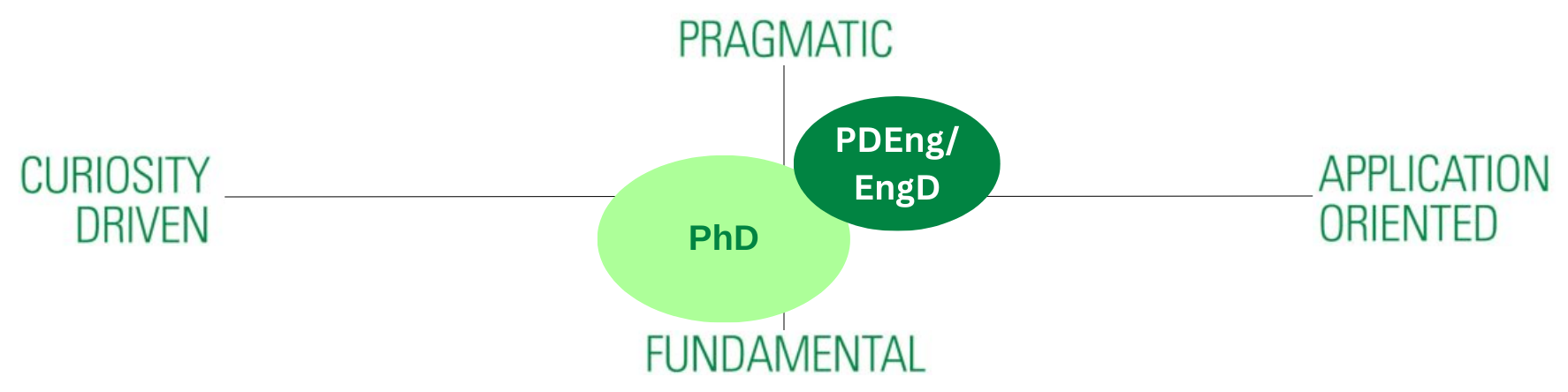
A 2D comparison of EngD and PhD: highlighting their key differences

The title PDEng is regarded as equivalent to the Engineering Doctorate (EngD), and as of 1 September 2022, the PDEng title in the Netherlands has been renamed to EngD.

== Accreditation ==
The three or two-year, full-time post-master programs all lead to a Professional Doctorate in Engineering (PDEng) degree. At the end the university confers a Doctoral level degree, a PDEng, upon the candidate. The programs are certified by the Dutch Certification Committee for Technological Design Programs (CCTO or Dutch: Nederlandse Certificatiecommissie voor Opleidingen tot Technologisch Ontwerper), which represents the interests of the organization of Netherlands Industry Entrepreneurs and Employers (VNO-NCW/MKB Netherlands) and the Royal Netherlands Society of Engineers (Dutch: Koninklijk Instituut Van Ingenieurs - KIVI). The CCTO's main goal is to ensure that such degrees hold to the high standards established by both academia and industry. The committee reviews these degree programs every five years to ensure continued standards compliance.

Although the PDEng and PhD are both recognised as postgraduate degrees, they are not the same. A PDEng is practically oriented and does not require a body of original academic research to graduate.

== History ==
The Professional Doctorate in Engineering (PDEng) name owes its existence to the adoption of the Bachelor/Master (Ba/Ma) degree system after the Bologna Process. While most Dutch universities adopted the Ba/Ma system in 2001, the PDEng was known as the official Master of Technical Design (MTD) degree until 2004. From that date the Executive Boards of 3TU (TU/e, TU Delft and University of Twente) decided jointly to use PDEng. Later in 2022, the Executive Boards of 4TU (3TU + Wageningen University & Research) decided to change the degree from Professional Doctorate in Engineering (PDEng) to Engineering Doctorate (EngD) for graduates from the Technological Design or PDEng programs as of 1 September 2022.

== Admission ==
Application is open to university graduates from the Netherlands and other countries. A trainee must hold at least a Master of Science degree or equivalent, preferably in the exact sciences. Besides, applicant must have an interest in designing solutions for complex technological problems. There can be an assessment and selection procedure before entering a program. The PDEng programs use strict selection criteria to ensure the required high quality. Excellent marks, motivation and a design-oriented attitude are vitally important. A trainee should also have an excellent command of the English language. The exact admission and selection procedures are different at each program. All applications are judged by the Selection Committee.
