= Fire service vehicles in Germany =

Overview about fire engines in Germany

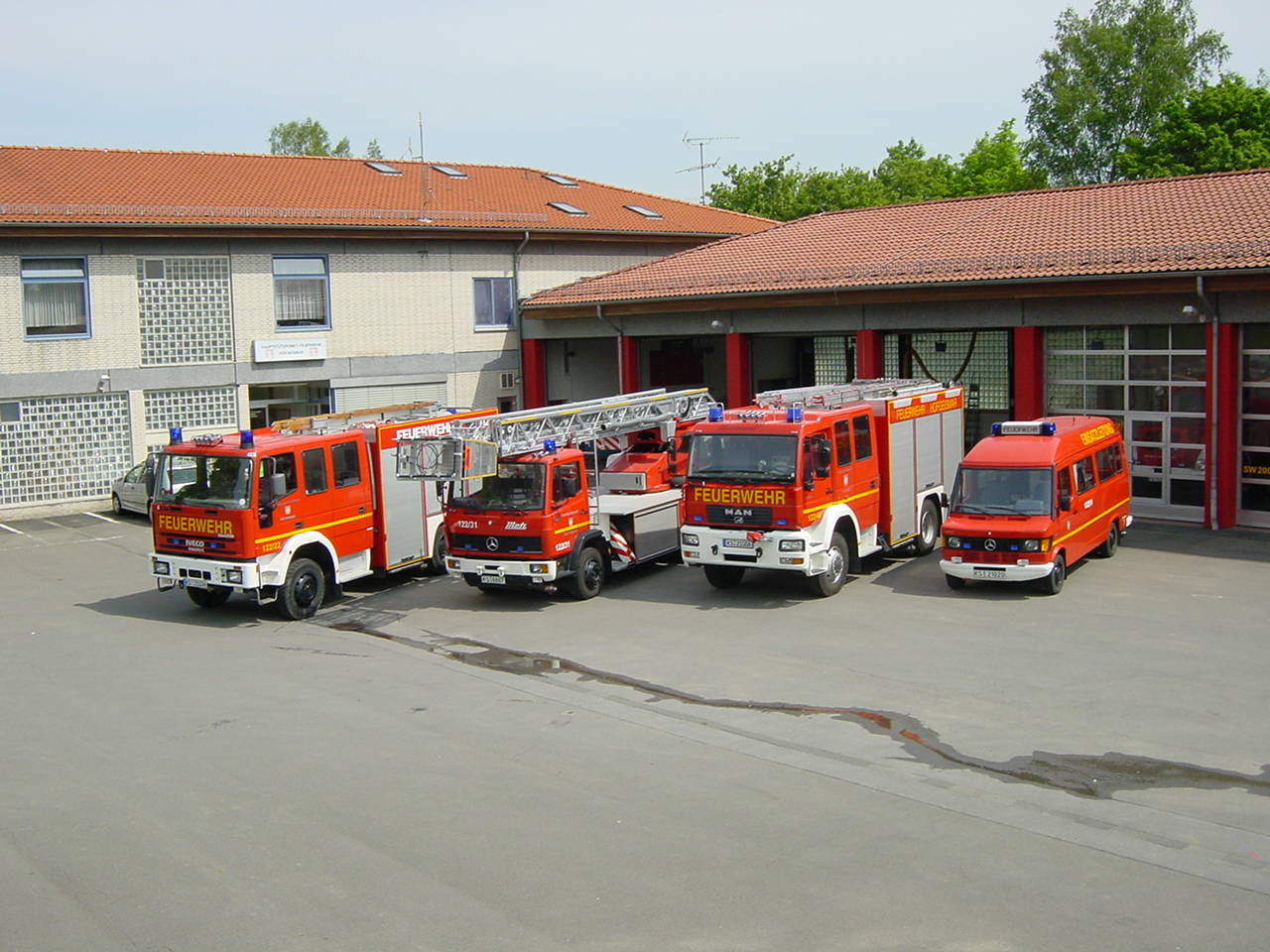
German fire vehicles

Fire vehicles in Germany are subject to many special requirements; they must be as multifunctional as possible, and must be usable in all kinds of terrain such as cities, forests, fields, and mountains. To ensure simple and straightforward use even across regions, the German Institute for Standardisation (DIN) has standardized many emergency vehicles.

== Classification ==
In Germany, there are two criteria for classification of fire vehicles: crew size and standardization.

=== Crew size ===
German fire vehicles can be classified according to the tactical unit that occupies them. This is particularly important for operations requiring a large number of personnel to ensure transport of all first responders to the scene. This classification divides fire vehicles into 3 groups.

German fire vehicle seating is typically described using 4 numbers (for example, (0/1/2/3). The first number represents the number of platoon leaders (Zugführer). This is mainly used when referring to groups of vehicles (such as the Rüstzug), and is thus often left out when describing individual vehicles. The second describes the number of unit leaders, either squad leaders (Staffelführer) or group leaders (Gruppenführer). The third number describes the amount of standard crew members. This includes engineers (Maschinisten), troop leaders (Truppführer) (aside from when counting Truppfahrzeuge), and troop men (Truppmänner). The final number, which is sometimes underlined, is the total amount of people of any classification.

- ATruppfahrzeug (0/1/2/3) has 3 crew members: A troop leader (Truppführer), a crew member (Truppmann) and an engineer (Maschinist). Examples of Truppfahrzeuge are aerial rescue vehicles (Hubrettungsfahrzeuge), water tender engines (TLFs), hose vehicles (Schlauchwagen), Rüstwagen (RWs), and Gerätewagen (GWs).
- A Staffelfahrzeug (0/1/5/6) has 6 crew members: A squad leader (Staffelführer), an engineer (Maschinist) and two troops (each having a troop leader (Truppführer) and a crew member (Truppmann), respectively). Examples of Staffelfahrzeugen are portable pump vehicles (TSFs), some water tender engines (TLFs), and small fire engines (KLFs).
- A Gruppenfahrzeug (0/1/8/9 or 1/0/8/9) has 9 crew members: A group leader (Gruppenführer), an engineer (Maschinist), a Melder, and three troops (each having a troop leader (Truppführer) and a crew member (Truppmann), respectively). Examples of Gruppenfahrzeugen are Löschgruppenfahrzeuge (LFs), Hilfeleistungslöschgruppenfahrzeuge (HLFs), Mannschaftstransportfahrzeuge (MTFs/MTWs), and often Mehrzweckfahrzeuge (MZFs).

=== Standardization ===
Most German fire vehicles are standardized in accordance with DIN. DIN 14500 through 14599, as well as DIN 14700 to 14709 are used for this purpose.

==== List of standardized German fire engine types ====
Vehicle name (German)	Abbreviation	Pump	Main task(s)	Gross vehicle weight (metric tons)	Crew size	Minimum tank volume
Tragkraftspritzenfahrzeug	TSF	PFPN 10-1000	Firefighting	4,75 t	Staffel (0/1/5/6)	–
Tragkraftspritzenfahrzeug mit Wasser	TSF-W	PFPN 10-1000	Firefighting	7,5 t	Staffel (0/1/5/6)	500 to 750 l
Kleinlöschfahrzeug	KLF	PFPN 10-1000	Firefighting	4,75 t	Staffel (0/1/5/6)	500 l
Mittleres Löschfahrzeug	MLF	FPN 10-1000	Firefighting	9 t	Staffel (0/1/5/6)	600 to 1000 l
Löschgruppenfahrzeug 10	LF 10	FPN 10-1000	Firefighting / technical assistance	14 t	Gruppe (0/1/8/9)	1200 l
Hilfeleistungslöschgruppenfahrzeug 10	HLF 10	FPN 10-1000	Firefighting / technical assistance	14 t	Gruppe (0/1/8/9)	1000 l
Löschgruppenfahrzeug 20	LF 20	FPN 10-2000	Firefighting / technical assistance	16 t	Gruppe (0/1/8/9)	2000 l
Hilfeleistungslöschgruppenfahrzeug 20	HLF 20	FPN 10-2000	Firefighting / technical assistance	16 t	Gruppe (0/1/8/9)	1600 l
Löschgruppenfahrzeug 20 für den Katastrophenschutz	LF 20 KatS	FPN 10-2000	Firefighting / technical assistance	16 t	Gruppe (0/1/8/9)	1000 l
Tanklöschfahrzeug 2000	TLF 2000	FPN 10-1000	Firefighting	14 t	Trupp (0/1/2/3)	2000 l (1800 l)
Tanklöschfahrzeug 3000	TLF 3000	FPN 10-2000	Firefighting	14 t	Trupp (0/1/2/3)	3000 l
Tanklöschfahrzeug 4000	TLF 4000	FPN 10-2000	Firefighting	>16 t	Trupp (0/1/2/3)	4000 l + 500 l foam
Drehleiter 12/9	DLK 12 (DLAK 12/9)	–	Rescue	13 t	Trupp (0/1/2/3)	–
Drehleiter 18/12	DLK 18 (DLAK 18/12)	–	Rescue	14 t	Trupp (0/1/2/3)	–
Drehleiter 23/12	DLK 23 (DLAK 23/12)	–	Rescue	16 t	Trupp (0/1/2/3)	–
Teleskopgelenkmast 18/12	TGM 18/12	–	Firefighting / technical assistance / rescue	16 t	Trupp (0/1/1/2)	–
Teleskopgelenkmast 23/12	TGM 23/12	–	Firefighting / technical assistance / rescue	16 t	Trupp (0/1/1/2)	–
Wechselladerfahrzeug	WLF	–	Logistics	>16 t	Trupp (0/1/1/2)	–
Rüstwagen	RW	–	Technical assistance	16 t	Trupp (0/1/2/3)	–
Gerätewagen Gefahrgut	GW-G	–	Hazardous material incidents	16 t	Trupp (0/1/1/2 oder 0/1/2/3)	–
Gerätewagen Logistik 1	GW-L1	–	Logistics	7,5 t (16 t)	Trupp (0/1/2/3) or Staffel (0/1/5/6)	–
Gerätewagen Logistik 2	GW-L2	–	Logistics	16 t	Staffel (0/1/5/6)	–
Kommandowagen	KdoW	–	Command	3,5 t	(0/1/2/3)	–
Einsatzleitwagen 1	ELW 1	–	Command	4,75 t	(0/1/2/3)	–
Einsatzleitwagen 2	ELW 2	–	Command	16 t (>16 t)	Trupp (0/1/2/3)	–

Sources: Deutsches Institut für Normung – Feuerwehrfahrzeug-Typenliste der gängigsten Fahrzeuge, Landesfeuerwehrschule Schleswig-Holstein – Fahrzeug- und Gerätekunde - Lehrgang Gruppenführung, Kreisjugendfeuerwehr Nordhausen – Übersicht: Kurzzeichen im Feuerwehrwesen nach DIN 14033

== Command vehicles ==
The Einsatzleitwagen (ELW) transports the incident commander (Einsatzleiter) to the scene and helps them coordinate operations. For this reason, they transport various maps, radios, reference materials, and other command resources. Currently, 3 Einsatzleitwagen are standardized: KdoW; ELW 1; and ELW 2.

=== ELW 1 ===
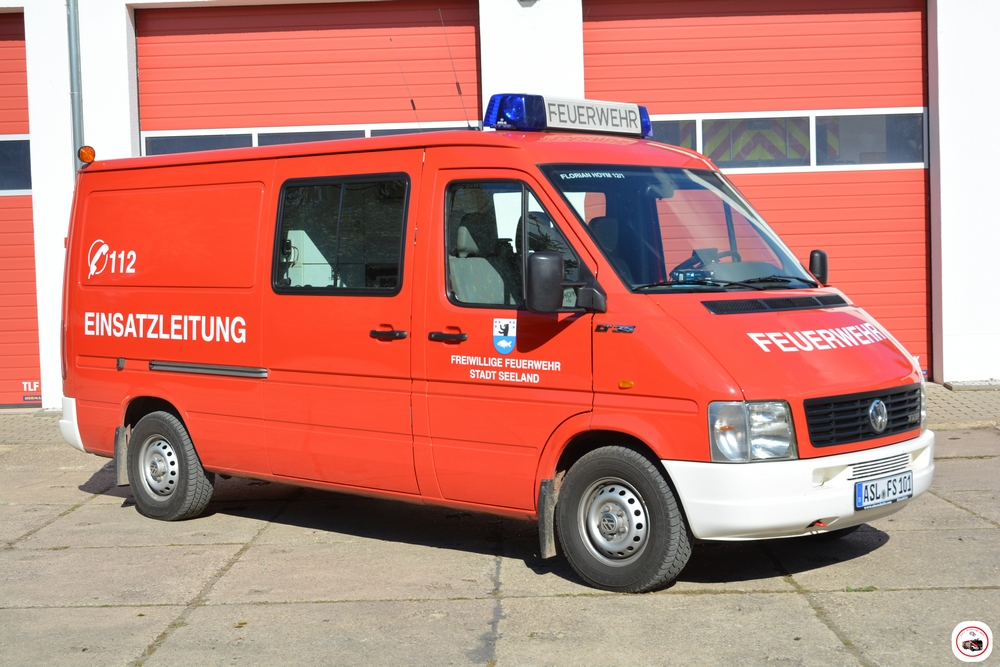
ELW 1

The ELW 1 is primarily used by incident command for traveling to and surveying incidents, as an aid for leading tactical units, and as an aid for commanding formations. However, it lacks staff-style command operations. It is standardized according to DIN 14507-2.

=== ELW 2 ===
The ELW 2 is used in larger scenarios where significant coordination is required. The ELW 2 not only has radio work stations, but also a meeting room; in total, it must have 3 separate rooms/compartments. The ELW 2 is standardized according to DIN 14507-3.

=== KdoW ===
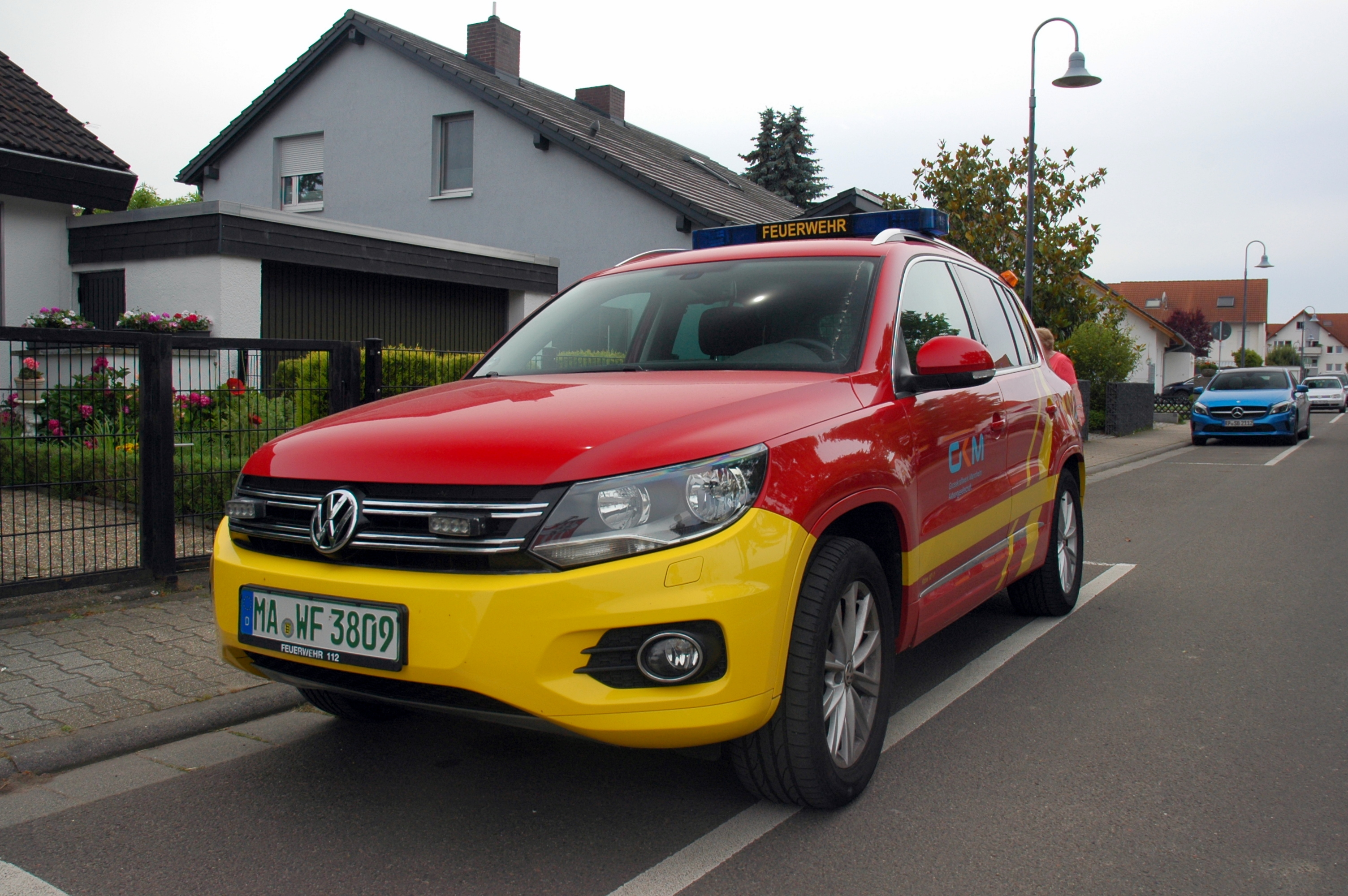
KdoW

The Kommandowagen (KdoW) is used by the incident command for traveling to and surveying incident sites. Depending on the department, it can be the official vehicle of the full-time fire chief (Kommandant). The KdoW is standardized according to DIN 14507-5.

== Fire engines (Löschfahrzeuge) ==
Fire engines (Löschfahrzeuge) carry equipment for fighting fires. This includes pumps, hoses, nozzles, and typically a water tank, in addition to other technical equipment. Their primary task is firefighting.

=== Portable pump vehicles (Tragkraftspritzenfahrzeuge/TLF) ===
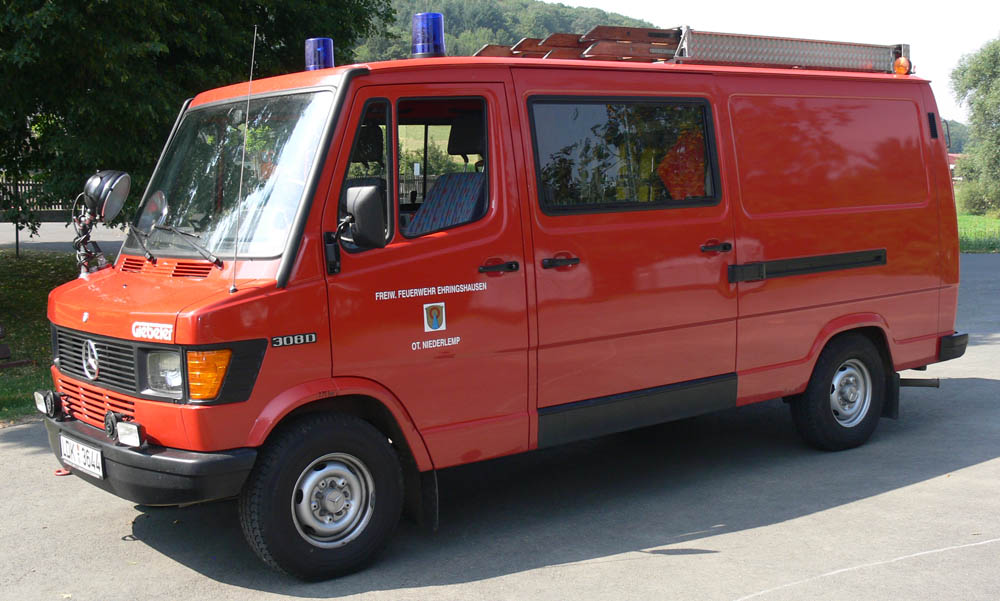
Van derived TSF

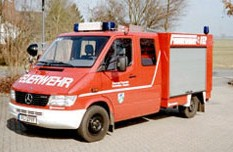
Chassis cab derived TSF

Tragkraftspritzenfahrzeuge (TSFs) are small fire engines equipped with firefighting equipment. They seat a squad (Staffel) and have a maximum vehicle weight of 4,75 t (4,5 t without SCBA equipment). They are light vehicles, primarily used by volunteer fire departments covering smaller areas. They do not have a permanent pump, rather they carry a portable fire pump (PFPN 10 / 1000) mounted on a sled in the rear of the vehicle. The TSF seats only a squad (Staffel), but still has the complete equipment for a group (Gruppe) on board, including 4 SCBA units and a 4-part sectional ladder.

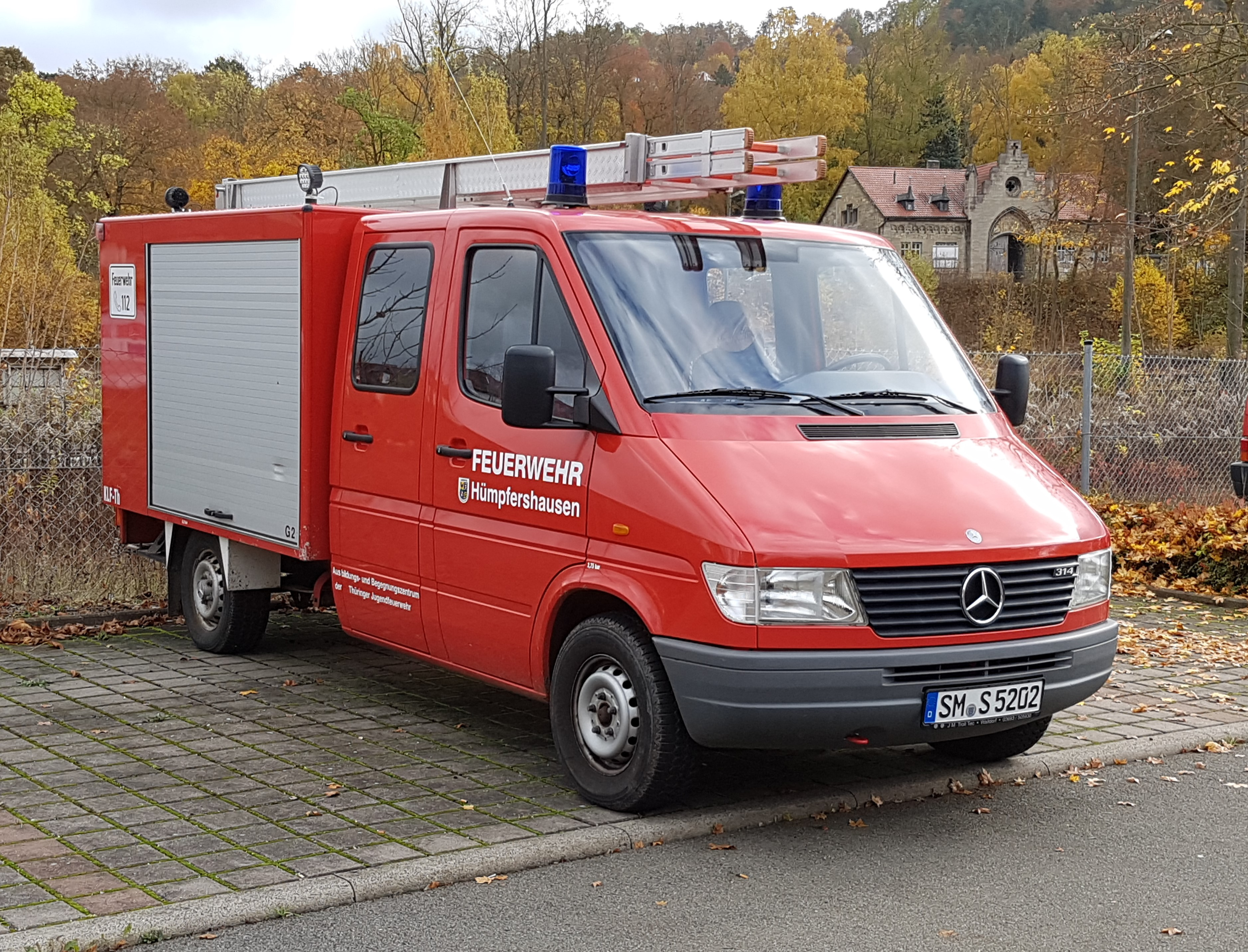
Kleinlöschfahrzeug (KLF)

Currently, 3 Tragkraftspritzenfahrzeuge are standardized: TSF; TSF-W; TSF-L

=== Small fire engine (Kleinlöschfahrzeug/KLF) ===
The Kleinlöschfahrzeug (KLF) is a fire engine equipped with at least one portable pump PFPN 10-1000 standardized in DIN 14530-24, equipment for quick water access, a water tank with a minimum usable volume of 500 L (130 US gal), and firefighting equipment for a Gruppe (group) (0/1/8/9). The vehicle sits a Staffel (squad) (0/1/5/6). The vehicle is mainly used for firefighting and along with its crew, forms an independent tactual unit.

The maximum allowed length is 6 m (20 ft), the maximum allowed width is 2.3 m (7.5 ft), and the maximum allowed height is 2.6 m (8.5 ft). The allowed weight is limited to 4,750 kg (10,470 lb).

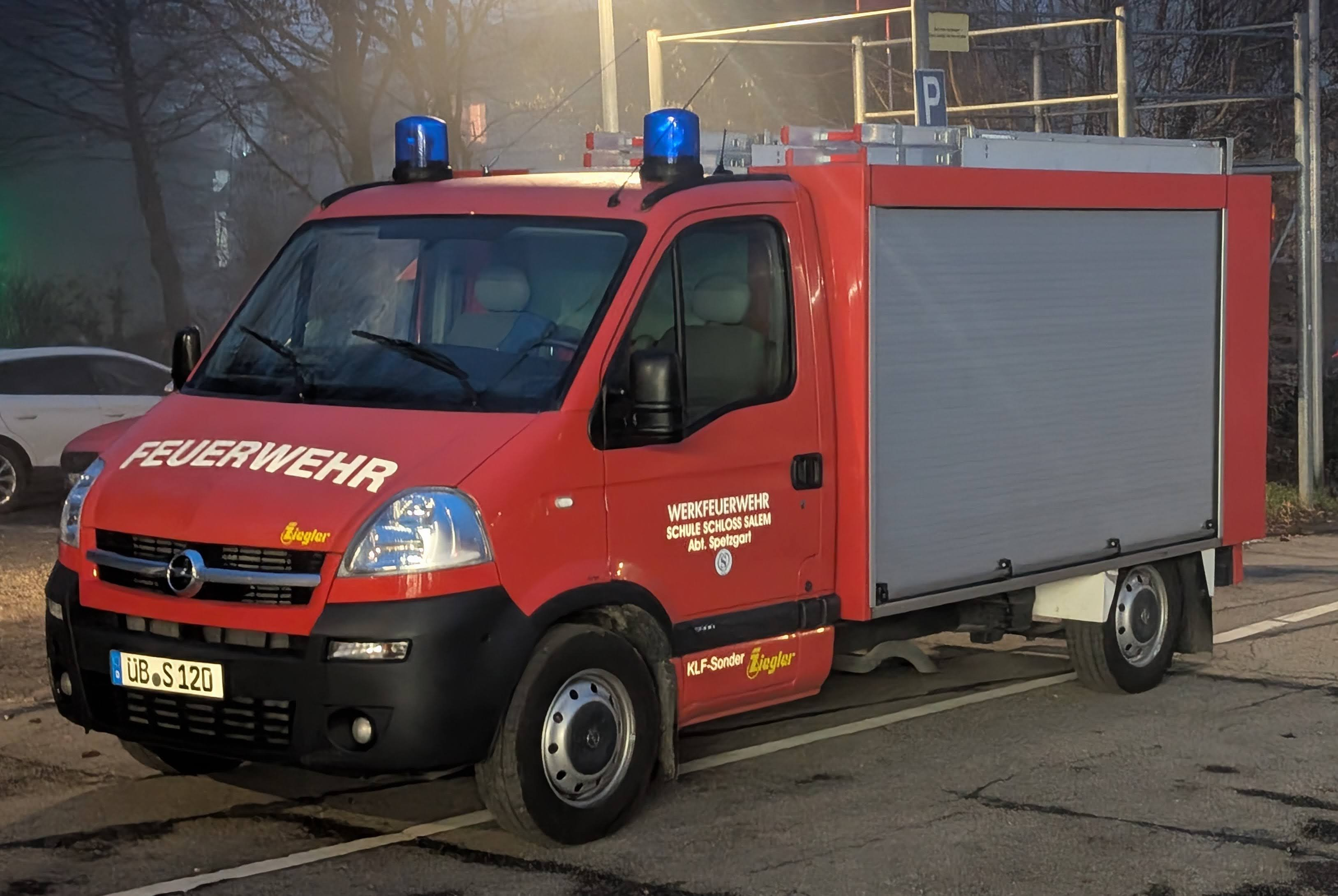
A non-standardized KLF with a capacity of only 2

Aside from the standardized KLF, there are also non-standardized, custom vehicles used by departments that carry the same name.

=== Medium fire engine (Mittleres Löschfahrzeug/MLF) ===
Mittlere Löschfahrzeuge (MLFs), formerly known as „Staffellöschfahrzeug“ (StLF) in the old DIN standard, are medium-sized fire engines that fall between the LF 10 and the TSF-W. They are standardized by DIN 14530-25, and fill the gap from small and medium-sized fire departments needing a small, standardized, multi-purpose vehicle. A vehicle sits a Staffel (squad), and has a maximum weight of 9,000 kg (20,000 lb). It must have a usable water supply of at least 600 L (160 US gal), extensive firefighting equipment, and a limited amount of technical assistance equipment.

=== Löschgruppenfahrzeuge (LF) ===
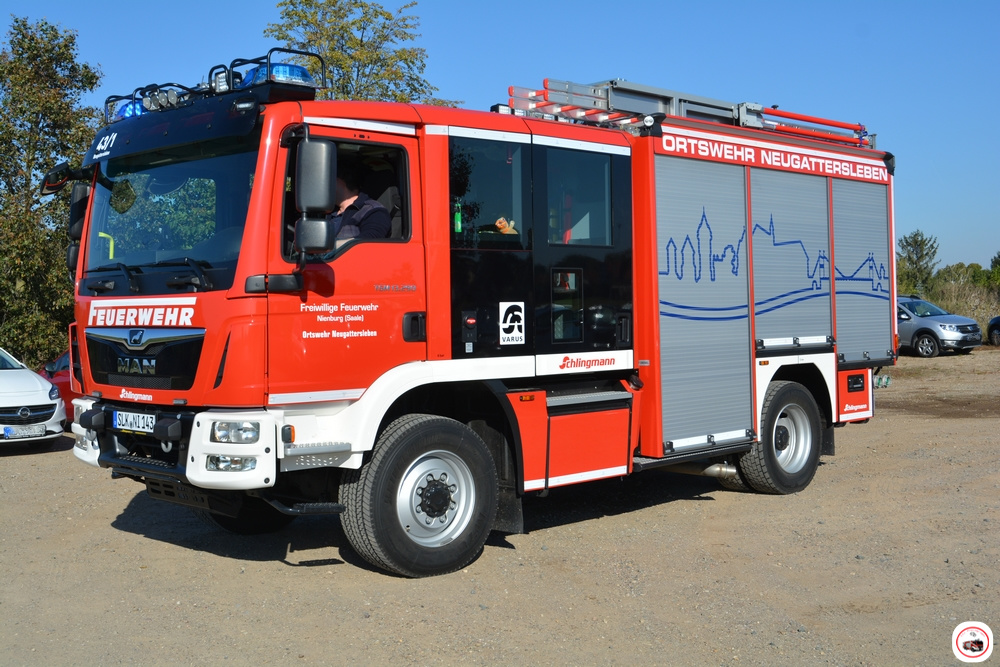
Löschgruppenfahrzeug (LF) 10

Löschgruppenfahrzeuge (LFs) are the backbone of nearly every firefighting operation. They carry the majority of the firefighting equipment and a significant portion of the crew (a Gruppe), as well as one or two centrifugal fire pumps. Thanks to the built in tanks and quick-attack system (Schellangriffseinrichtung), initial firefighting operations can begin, even without a water source.

Currently, 3 LFs are standardized: the LF 10, the LF 20, and the Löschgruppenfahrzeug 20 KatS.

LFs built to the old standards are still very common. Example of this are: LF 8, LF 8/6, LF 10/6; LF 16, LF 16/12, LF 20/16; and LF 24. There also exists the LF 16-TS, which carries a portable pump and is primarily used for disaster relief. Its equipment involves, among other things, 600 m (2,000 ft) of B hoses. The successor of the LF 16-TS is the LF 20 KatS, set by the new standards. According to the old naming standard, LF stood for Löschgruppenfahrzeug and the number before the slash indicated the output of the centrifugal pump (20 for a nominal output of at least 2,000 L (530 U.S. gal) per minute at a pressure of 10 bar (150 psi). The following number stood for the tank volume in units of 100 liters (26 U.S. gal).

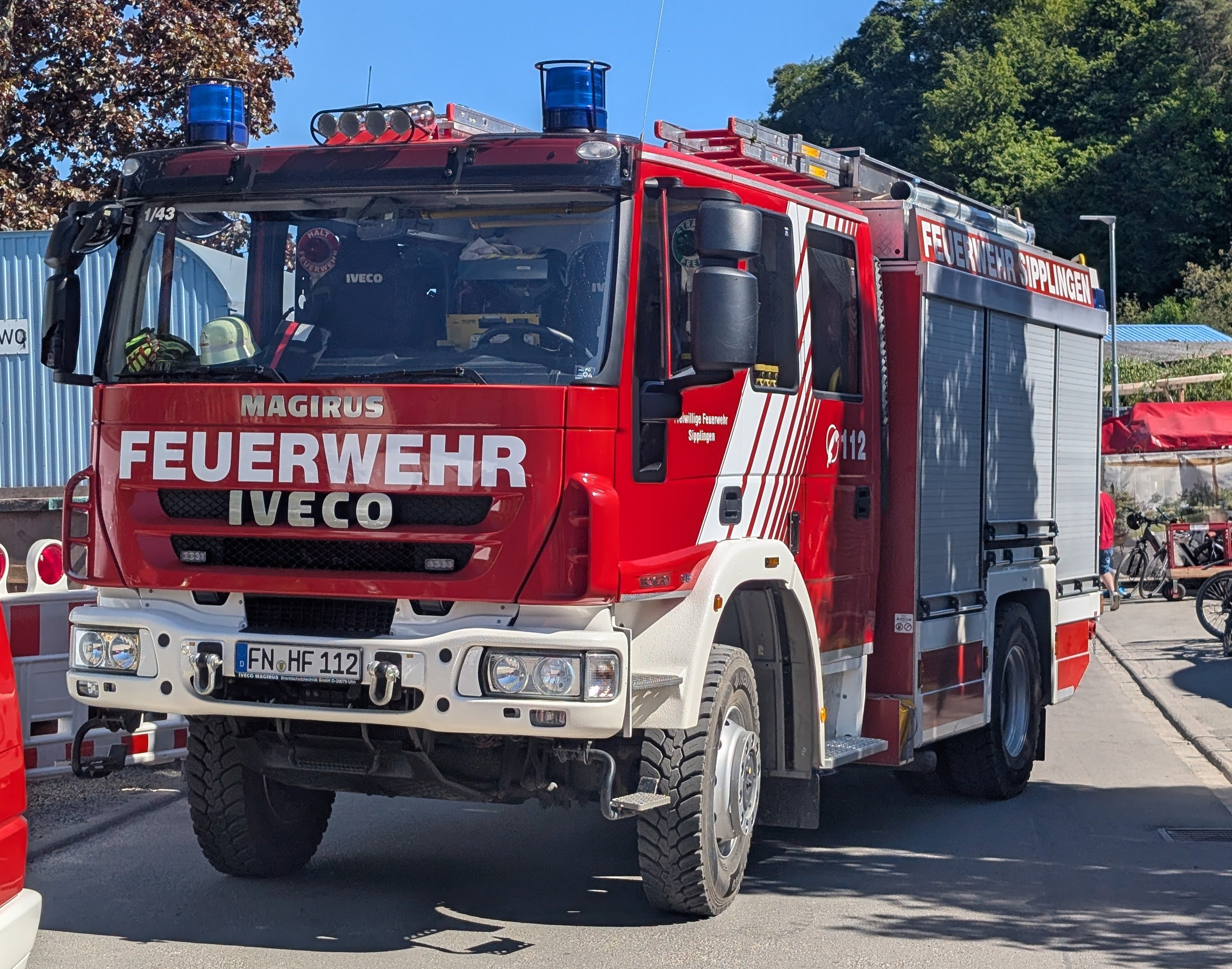
HLF 10

=== Hilfeleistungslöschgruppenfahrzeug (HLF) ===
Hilfeleistungslöschgruppenfahrzeuge (HLFs) are common in larger fire brigades and are characterized by their wide assortment of technical assistance equipment supplementing the firefighting equipment. The vehicle is designed to fit 9 people. Currently, only the HLF 10 (formerly HLF 10/6) and the HLF 20 (formerly HLF 20/16) are standardized.

=== Water tender engines (Tanklöschfahrzeuge/TLF) ===
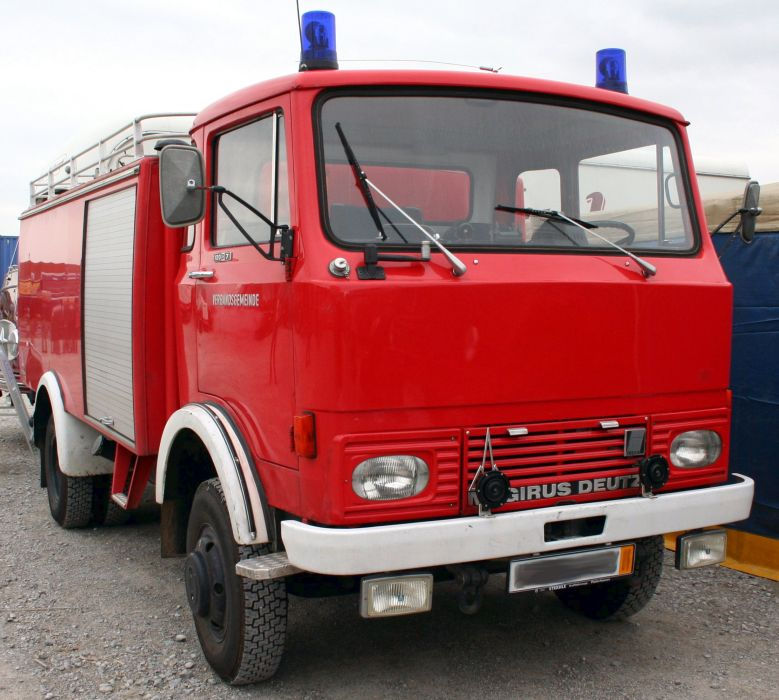
TLF 8/18 at Magirus-Deutz

Tanklöschfahrzeuge (TLFs) are vehicles that mainly serve to supply water and other extinguishing agents over extended periods of time, sometimes in a shuttle service if necessary. They are often necessary, particularly when it comes to dealing with wildfires.

In addition to extinguishing agents, TLFs transport part of the necessary equipment to deal with fires. Newer vehicles are crewed with Truppbesatzung (0/1/2/3), but older standards also allowed TLFs with Staffelbesatzung (0/1/5/6). TLFs can typically respond to smaller emergencies, such as burning garbage cans, etc., on their own.

Currently, 3 types of TLF are standardized: the TLF 2000, the TLF 3000, and the TLF 4000, with the number signifying the water tank volume in liters.

In the past, the TLF 24/50, the TLF 16/24-Tr, the TLF 20/40, and the TLF 20/40-SL were all standardized. Some vehicles built to older standards such as the TLF 8/8, the TLF 8/18, and the TLF 16/25, as well as those mentioned before are still common to this day.

In addition, there are also large tank fire engines such as the Großtanklöschfahrzeug (GTLF), a larger variant of the TLF. In Brandenburg, the TLF 16/45 was designed specifically to fight forest fires. The Lower Saxon wildfire vehicle was the TLF 8 W.

=== Turntable ladders (Drehleitern/DL/DLK) ===
Turntable ladders (Drehleitern, DL/DLK) are the best-known and most widespread aerial rescue vehicles in Germany. They allow access to higher stories via an extendable ladder. The abbreviation DL stands for „Drehleiter“, meaning "turntable ladder", and the abbreviation DLK stands for „Drehleiter mit Rettungskorb“, or "turntable ladder with rescue basket". The first number following either DL or DLK is the maximum rescue height in meters.

The new abbreviations, DLA(K) and DLS(K), stand for "automatic turntable ladder (with basket)" ("Drehleiter Automatik (mit Korb)") and "sequential or half-automatic turntable ladder" ("Drehleiter Sequentiell bzw. Halbautomatik"). DLA turntable ladders can perform multiple lifting movements at the same time, whereas DLS ladders can only do one at a time. Because of this, DLS ladders cannot meet the requirements for setup time and are no longer procured in Germany.

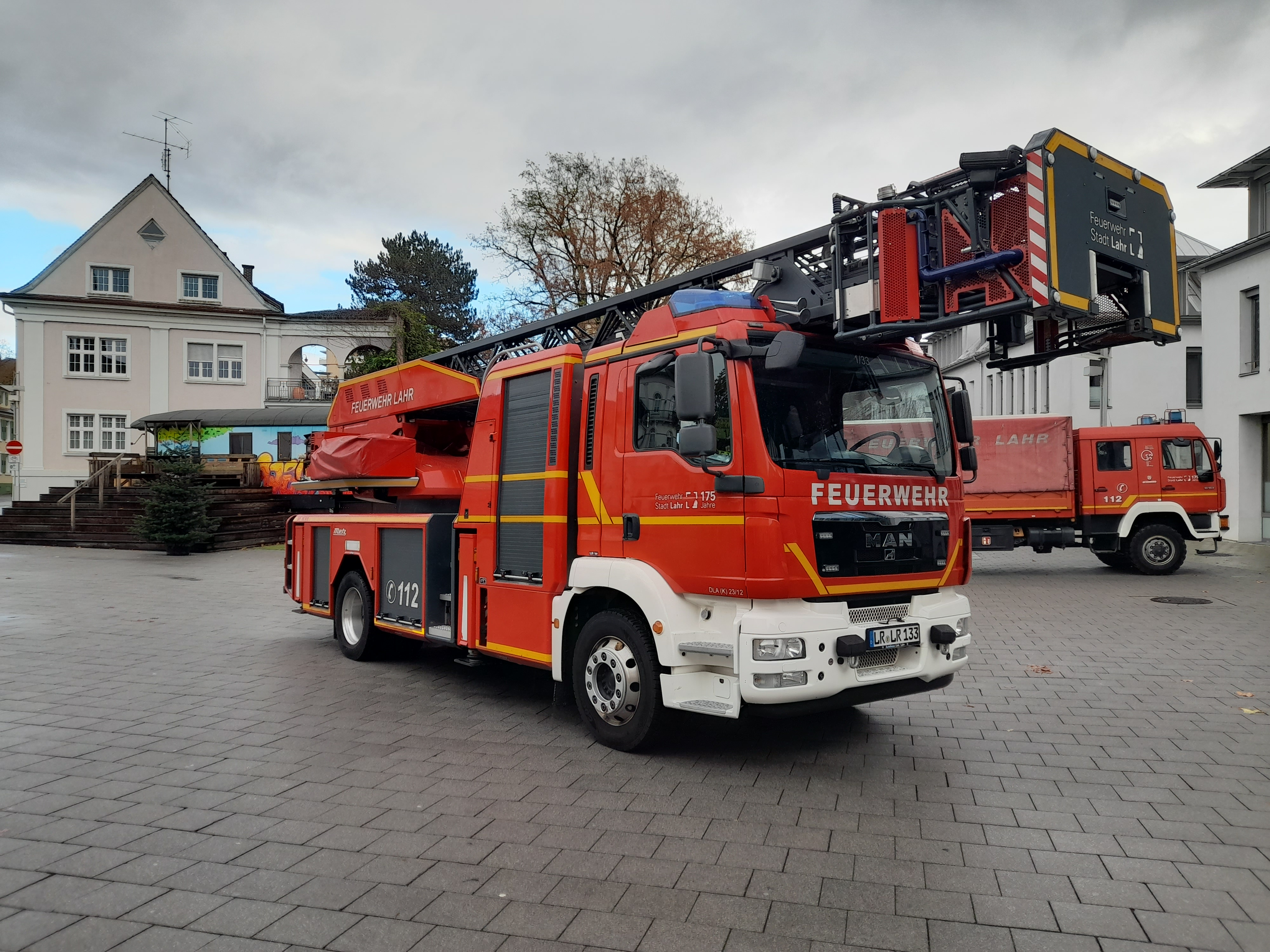
Drehleiter DLA (K) 23/12

Currently, 3 turntable ladders are standardized in Germany as aerial rescue vehicles:

- DLA/DLS (K) 12-9
- DLA/DLS (K) 18-12
- DLA/DLS (K) 23-12

The hand-operated DL 16-4 was standardized up until 2011.

Additionally, there are several types of turntable ladder that are versions of the DLK 23-12, but have a longer ladder assembly and are therefore not standardized such as the DLK 37 and the DLK 44.

== Rescue and equipment vehicles ==
Rescue and equipment vehicles bring special materials and equipment for technical assistance (such as for vehicle and chemical accidents). They usually only have a small crew.

=== Rescue vehicle (Rüstwagen/RW) ===
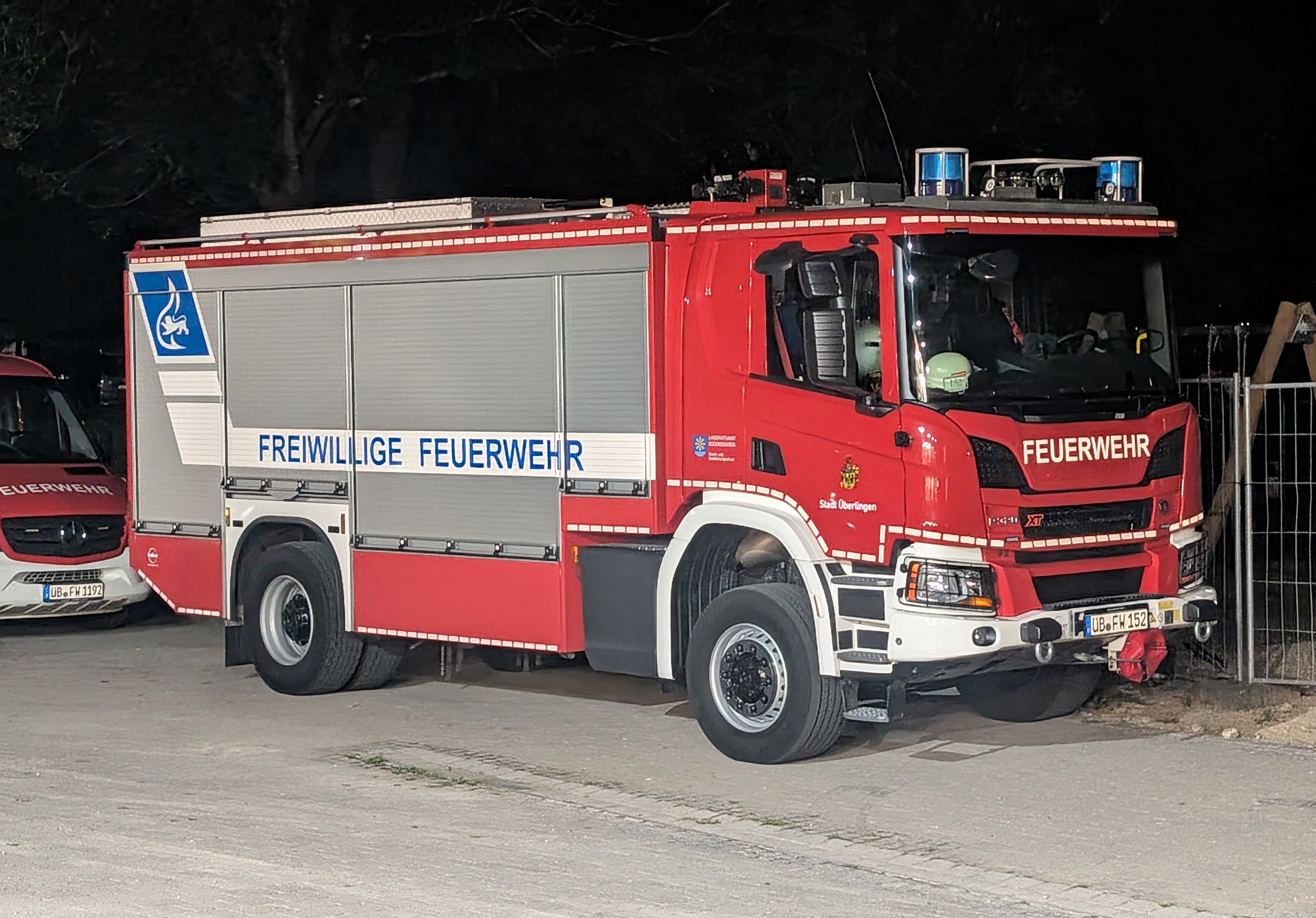
Rüstwagen 2 (RW2)

Rüstwagen (RW) are fire vehicles used for large-scale technical assistance. They are commonly used for severe vehicle accidents, rescue situations, electricity supply, severe weather situations, building collapses, oil spills, and much more.

RWs have all-wheel-drive, a winch, a generator, and many types of equipment. They provide the majority of the equipment for a rescue unit (Rüstzug), and have a Truppbesatzung (0/1/2/3). The Rüstwagen does not typically constitute an independent unit, and is typically paired with at least one water-supplying vehicle.

A Rüstzug is made up of a command vehicle (Einsatzleitwagen), a Hilfeleistungslöschfahrzeug, a Rüstwagen, and other vehicles if available.

Currently, there is only one standardized Rüstwagen. However, there are still many older Rüstwagen in the 3 old size categories, RW 1; RW 2; and RW 3. The standard was changed in 2002, although RW 3 had already been removed from the standard earlier.

=== Equipment vehicle (Gerätewagen/GW) ===
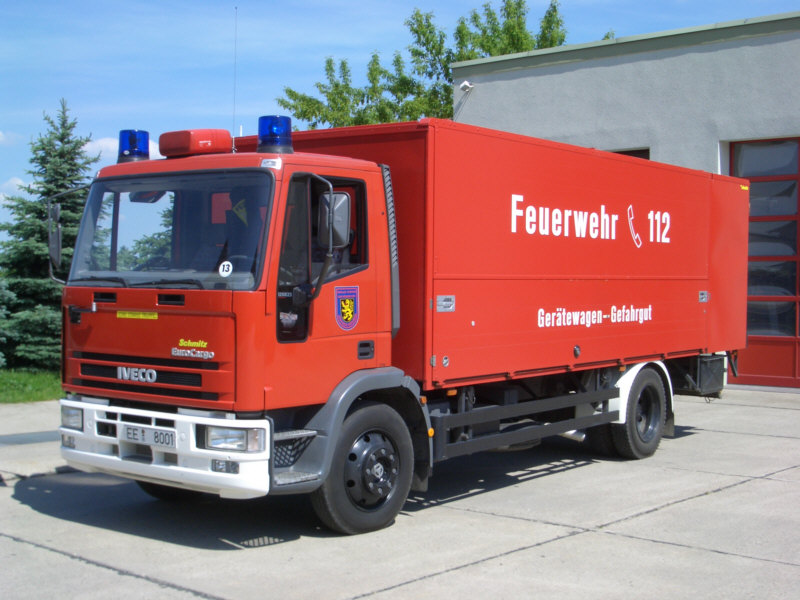
GW-G

Gerätewagen (GW) are fire vehicles designed for technical assistance. They can have all-wheel drive and usually carry highly specialized equipment. The vehicles can be assigned to different categories depending on the specialization of their equipment.

Currently, three Gerätewagen are DIN-standardized (according to DIN 14555): Gerätewägen Logistik GW-L1 and GW-L2 as well as the Gerätewagen Gefahrgut (GW-G). The former two are used for logistics, and the latter is used for hazardous materials.

The GW-G1, GW-G2, GW-G3; GW-Öl, and the SW 2000-Tr are no longer standardized but still commonly found across Germany. There are also many other forms of Gerätewagen that aren't standardized.

=== Fire service crane (Feuerwehrkran/FwK) ===
Fire service cranes (Feuerwehrkräne/FwK) are also not standardized, and are intended for lifting heavy loads (such as humans, animals, vehicles, trees, etc.) and for supporting technical assistance operations, although they can also be used directly for firefighting. They are among the largest and most expensive fire vehicles in Germany.

=== Hook-lift vehicles and roll-off containers (Wechselladerfahrzeuge//WLF and Abrollbehältern/AB) ===
Hook-lift vehicles (Wechselladerfahrzeuge, WLF) are special vehicles used to transport roll-off containers (Abrollbehältern, AB) with specific firefighting gear. They carry a crew of 3 und together with the equipment in the relevant container, typically form an independent tactical unit.

Common roll-off containers include: AB Einsatzleitung (operation control), AB Pumpen (pumps), AB Mulde (dump bed), AB Atemschutz (SCBA), AB Gefahrgut (hazardous materials), AB Sonderlöschmittel (special extinguishing agents), and AB Rüstmaterial (rescue equipment).

Hook-lift vehicles can also be equipped with a crane.

=== Emergency rescue vehicles ===
Emergency rescue vehicles are used for emergency rescue and patient transport, and can be operated by a fire department or, commonly, other organizations such as the German Red Cross or the Johanniter.

The patient transport ambulance, emergency ambulance, and the mobile intensive care unit are all standardized in DIN EN 1789 and the emergency physician vehicle is regulated in (DIN 75079).

== Non-standardized fire service vehicles ==
=== Small emergency vehicle (Kleineinsatzfahrzeug/KEF) ===
Kleineinsatzfahrzeuge (KEF), also known locally as Kleinalarmfahrzeug (KlAF), are equipment vehicles used to handle relatively minor incidents. The crew and equipment can vary significantly. Due to their range of applications, this type of vehicle is very common in urban fire departments.

=== Special fire engines (Sonderlöschfahrzeuge/SLF) ===
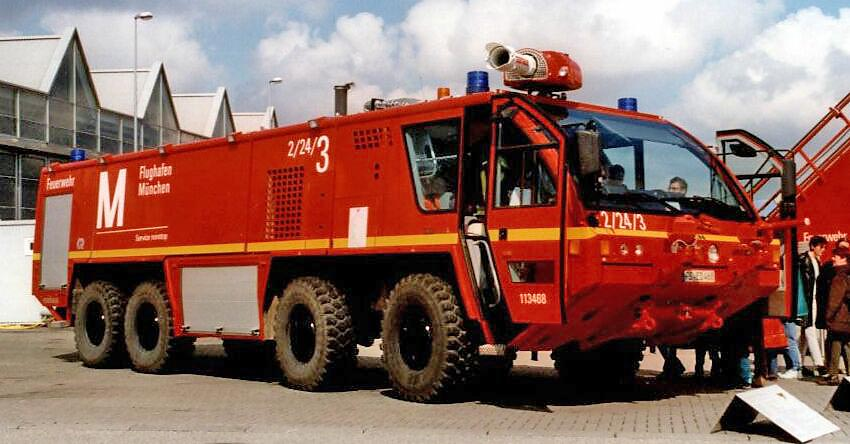
Airport crash tender Rosenbauer Panther

Sonderlöschfahrzeuge (SLF) are fire engines designed for highly specialized firefighting. They are typically used by non-public fire brigades (Werkfeuerwehren) or very large fire departments and are fundamentally different from conventional fire engines. Examples of these vehicles are the airport crash tender (Flugfeldlöschfahrzeuge, FLF), the fire tank (Löschpanzer), foam fire engines (Schaumlöschfahrzeuge), and aerosol fire engines (Aerosollöschfahrzeuge, also known as „Turbolöscher“).

=== Disaster response vehicles (KatS) ===
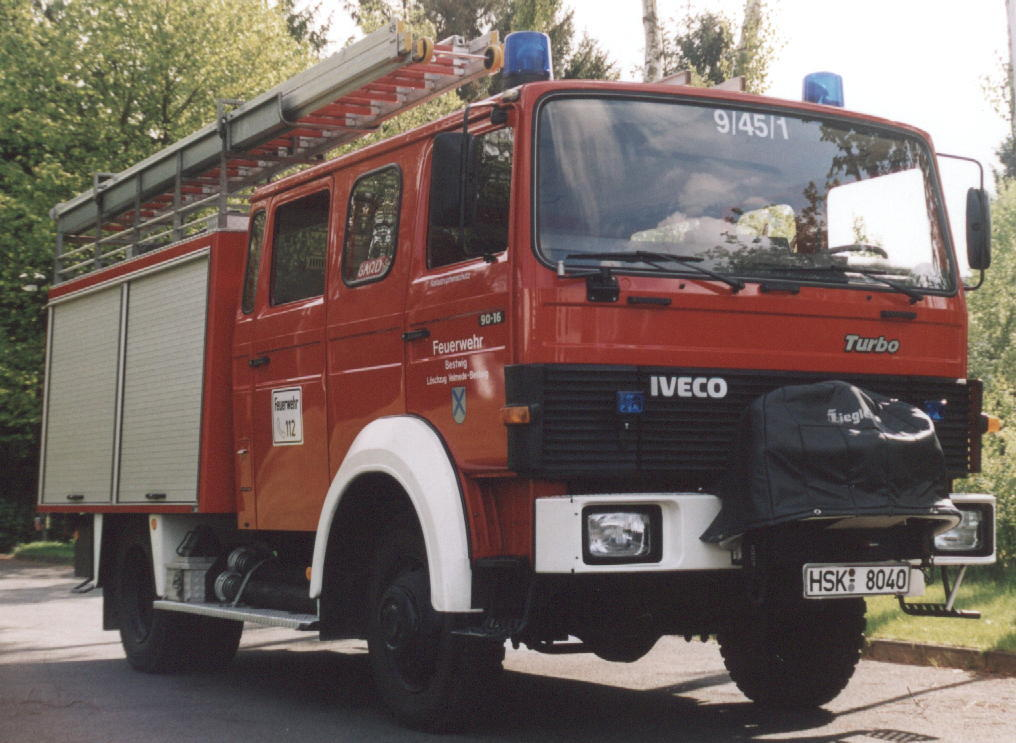
LF 16-TS (KatS)

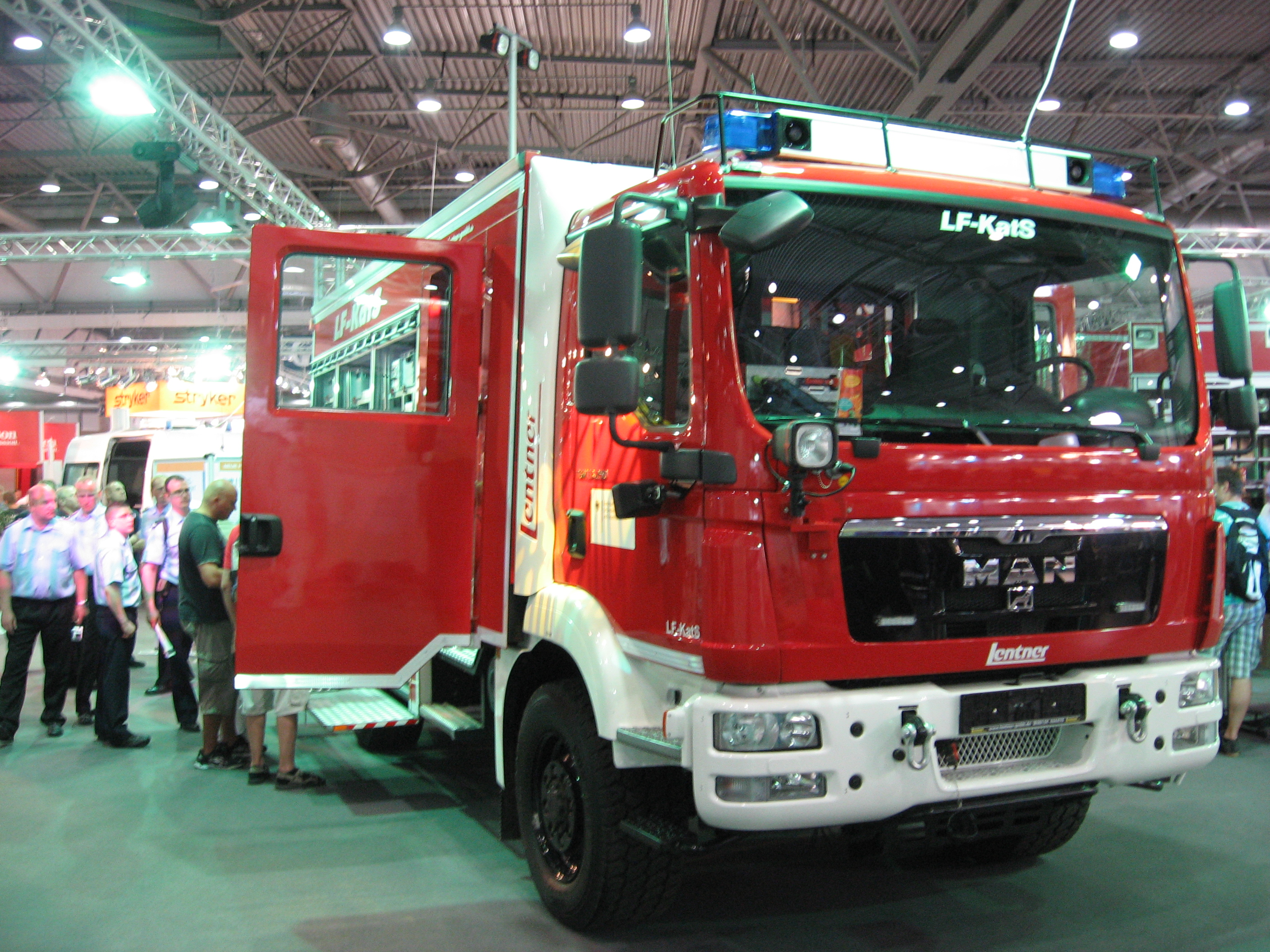
New LF 20 KatS

Disaster response and civil protection vehicles form a separate category of fire vehicles, generally with "KatS" (short for "Katastrophenschutz") in the name. They are typically not standardized according to DIN, but rather are described by the Federal Office of Civil Protection and Disaster Assistance (Bundesamt für Bevölkerungsschutz und Katastrophenhilfe) in a procurement request, centrally procured, and subsequently distributed to aid organizations throughout Germany. Thus, the vehicles remain property of the federal government. The procurement requests are typically more specific than typical vehicle standards, since they define specific chassis, bodies, engines, and equipment. Certain states add extra equipment in addition to the federal standards; for example, Lower Saxony has a state-specific disaster relief vehicle, the LF-KatS-NDS, in addition to those following the federal blueprint. It, however, is designed to not overly deviate from the federal standard.

Disaster response vehicles are designed for joint use in major incidents, but remain available to their respective fire department for regular operations as well.

=== Rail vehicles ===
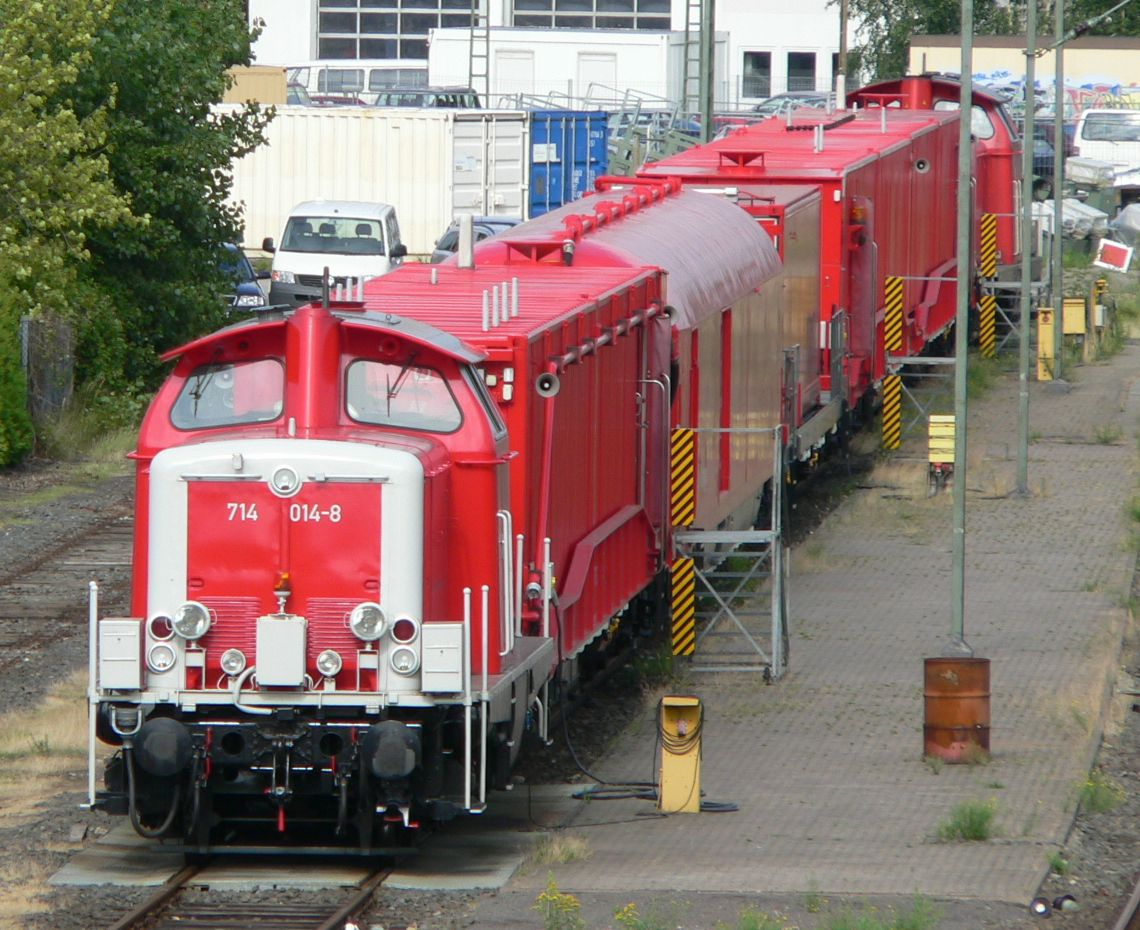
Rescue train of Deutsche Bahn AG

Rail-bound rescue equipment, typically a train made up of one or several locomotives and wagons, can be deployed in the case of an accident on or near a railway line. However, they are not fire engines in the typical sense. The trains, often referred to as rescue train (Rettungszug), fire and rescue train (Lösch- und Rettungszug) or tunnel assistance train (Tunnelhilfszug), are positioned in central areas and can be staffed by railway personnel, firefighters, and paramedics as needed. They serve as support to the local emergency services, not as replacement.

Additionally, there are vehicles such as the Hilfeleistungslöschfahrzeug 24/14-S that can travel on railroad tracks using a rail wheel set. These vehicles are often primarily intended for tunnels.

=== Fire service trailers (FwA) ===
Fire service trailers (FwA) are used to transport equipment to the scene of an incident. They are especially used by fire departments that can't afford the vehicles that would normally come with the equipment. Most fire service trailers are not standardized, with a notable exception being the boat trailer for the multi-purpose boat (MZB) and rescue boat (RTB)

=== Fireboats ===
The following boats are used by fire departments in Germany:

- Multi-purpose boats/Mehrzweckboote (MZB)
- Extinguishing boats/Feuerlöschboote (FLB)
- Rescue boats/Rettungsboote (RTB1 and RTB2)

The MZBs and RTBs are standardized in accordance with DIN 14961.

== Equipment ==
=== Pumps ===
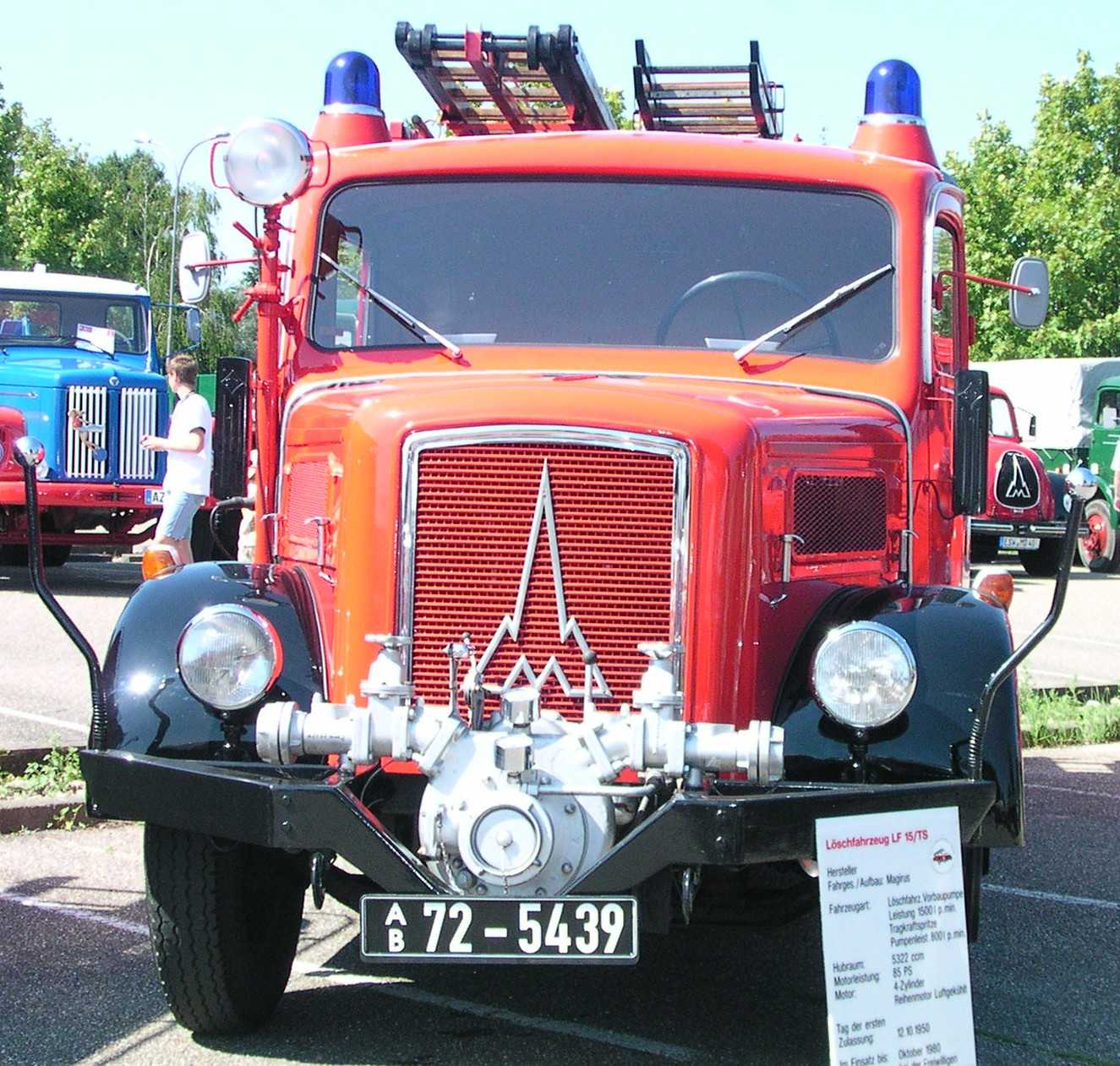
Front pump

Pumps permanently integrated into vehicles can be categorized either as a front pump or a back pump. Front pumps are used in vehicle types that have a second pump in the back, or in vehicles that drive directly up to water sources (such as the LF16-TS). Newer vehicles typically have the integrated pump in the back, and a second, portable pump on the side.

If only one pump is available, it is typically in the back behind the water tank, as the hose length from water tank to pump is minimized in this configuration. Additionally, the engineer (Maschinist) is generally safer standing by a pump in the back as opposed to by one on the side, particularly by tighter accident sites.

=== Radio ===
Fire engines are typically equipped with two-way radio to facilitate communication between tactical units. For this, 2-meter band handheld radios are used for on-site communication, whereas 4-meter band is used for communication between vehicles and disptatch. The switch to digital radio has been planned nationwide, and as of 2018, has been implemented in some places while others are still in the planning stage. This modern system is expected to provide better and more reliable communication, even over district and state borders.

== History ==
=== Fire vehicles before World War I ===
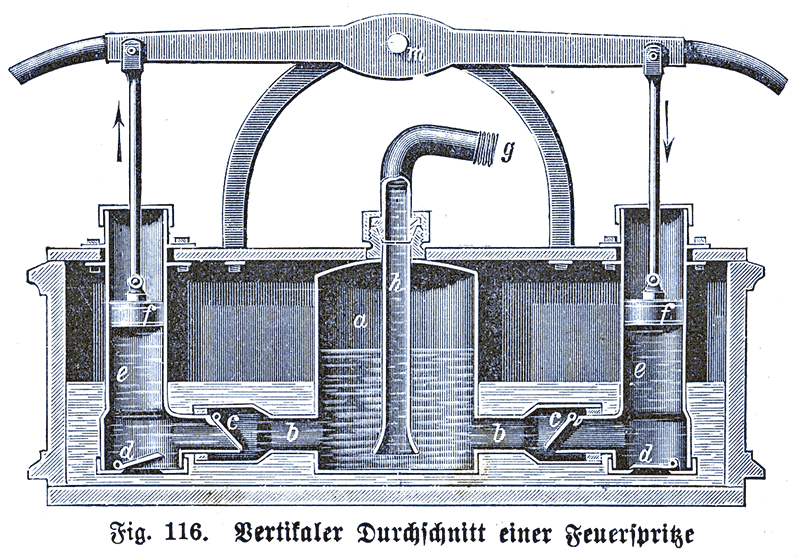
Historic fire pump

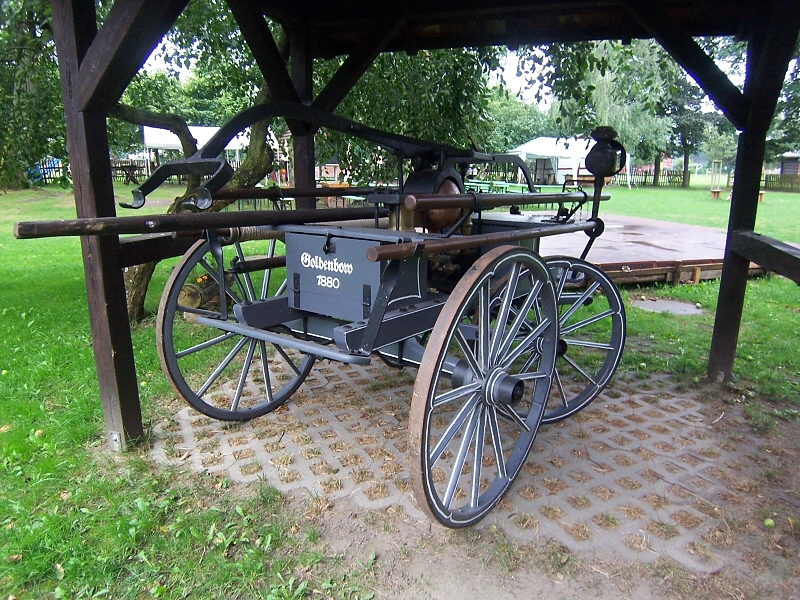
Historic fire pump from the Alt-Damerow fire department

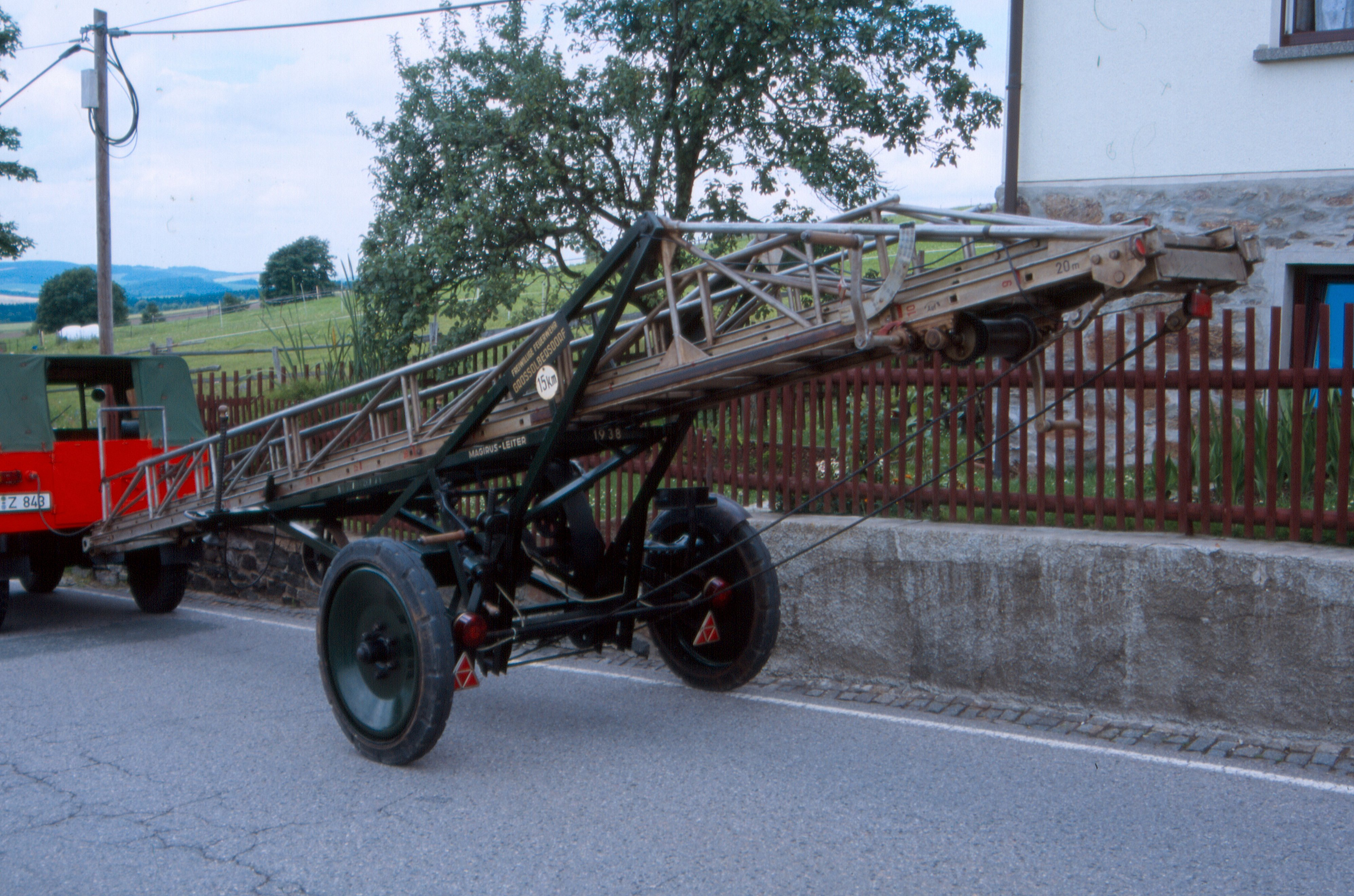
Historic fire ladder

The first fire vehicles were built by hand and were based on the design of coaches and wagons. Until the end of the 19th century, there were practically only two types of fire vehicle: the pump wagon (Spritzenwagen) and the portable ladder (Schiebeleiter), where were brought either by horses or the crew to the site. They were built of out of wood and were operated by muscle power, meaning they weren't always consistently reliable.

Due to industrialization, fire departments became increasingly mechanized. The history of modern fire vehicles began in 1902, when the Freiburg-based company Grether & Cie built the first fire engine with a combustion engine. The next milestone came in 1904, when Magirus (later Magirus-Deutz now Iveco Magirus) built the first motor-powered turntable ladder in the world, which still had to be extended by hand. Shortly after came motor pumps, which helped Magirus achieve economic success. Other fire equipment manufacturers also began installing fire truck bodies on truck-chassis at that time.

=== Fire vehicles after World War I ===
After World War I, the foundations for modern firefighting were laid. The vehicles got better, more multifunctional, and more modern. Rules and regulations were established that dictated how they could look and how they were to be used. Their development received a large boost, particularly during the Nazi era. On March 1, 1937, it was dictated that all fire service vehicles were to be painted fir green. From November 23, 1938 onwards, fire departments were put under the control of the police. Professional fire departments were renamed to Feuerschutzpolizei (Fire Protection Police), and volunteer fire departments became technical auxiliary units of the police, although the latter retained their title. Additionally, military fire brigades were formed.

Uniform building regulations went into effect in 1940. These laid out regulations for several types of fire engines such as the;

- Leichtes Löschgruppenfahrzeug (LLG, later LF 8)
- Schweres Löschgruppenfahrzeug (SLG, later LF 15)

Additional regulation allowing more types of vehicles went into effect on February 1 and June 1, 1941.

On August 14, 1942 came orders that all vehicles were to be delivered in matte black-gray (RAL 7021), and on April 7, 1943, the paint scheme was changed to matte yellow-gray (RAL 7028).

=== Fire engines after World War II ===
==== West Germany ====
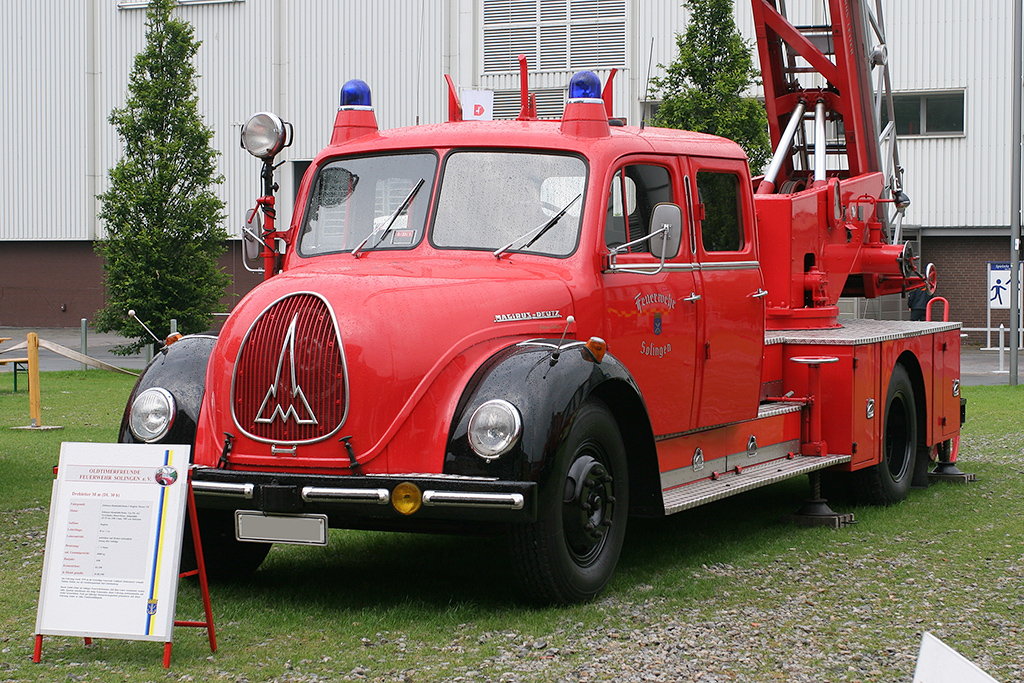
The Magirus-Deutz round-hooded truck – one of the most produced fire engines following WWII

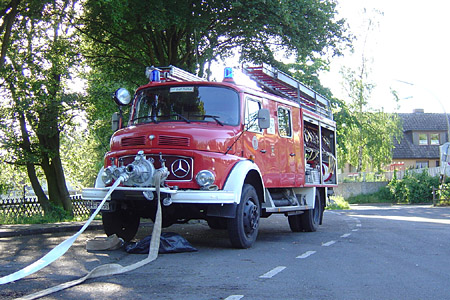
Mercedes-Benz short-hood truck

Following World War II, a host of vehicles was designed, many of which are still in use today. This includes most classic fire engines, Tanklöschfahrzeuge, turntable ladders, Rüst- and Gerätewagen, and much more. As time progressed, the vehicles developed.

Experience fighting forest fires and bush fires led to the development of larger and all-terrain water tenders and hose trucks.

Over time, the demands placed on the vehicles increased, and newer and larger engines were developed, although they also became increasingly similar to each other; for example, Löschgruppenfahrzeuge (LFs) got a quick-attack setup (Schnellangriffseinrichtung) and a tank, and water trucks got hydraulic rescue tools. At the same time however, more differences developed, such as with turntable ladders. From 1980 onward, new turntable ladders with low-entry cabs were introduced, with the cab positioned ahead of the front axle in order to reduce the overall height of the vehicle. This was particularly helpful for operations in narrow city centers.

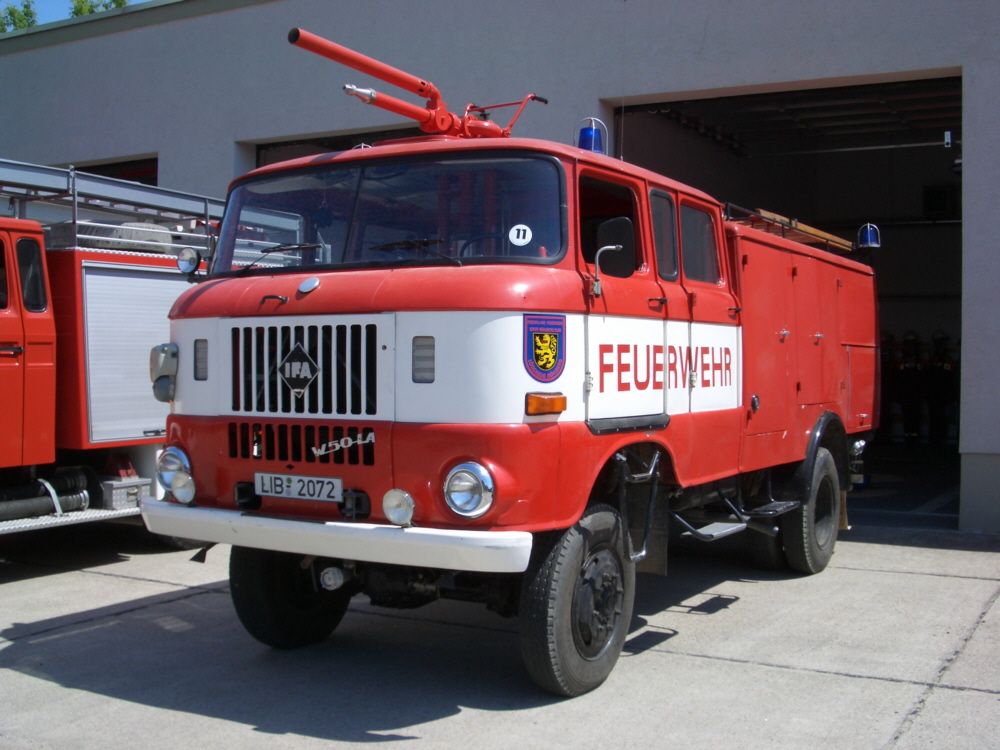
An IFA W50 TLF

==== East Germany ====
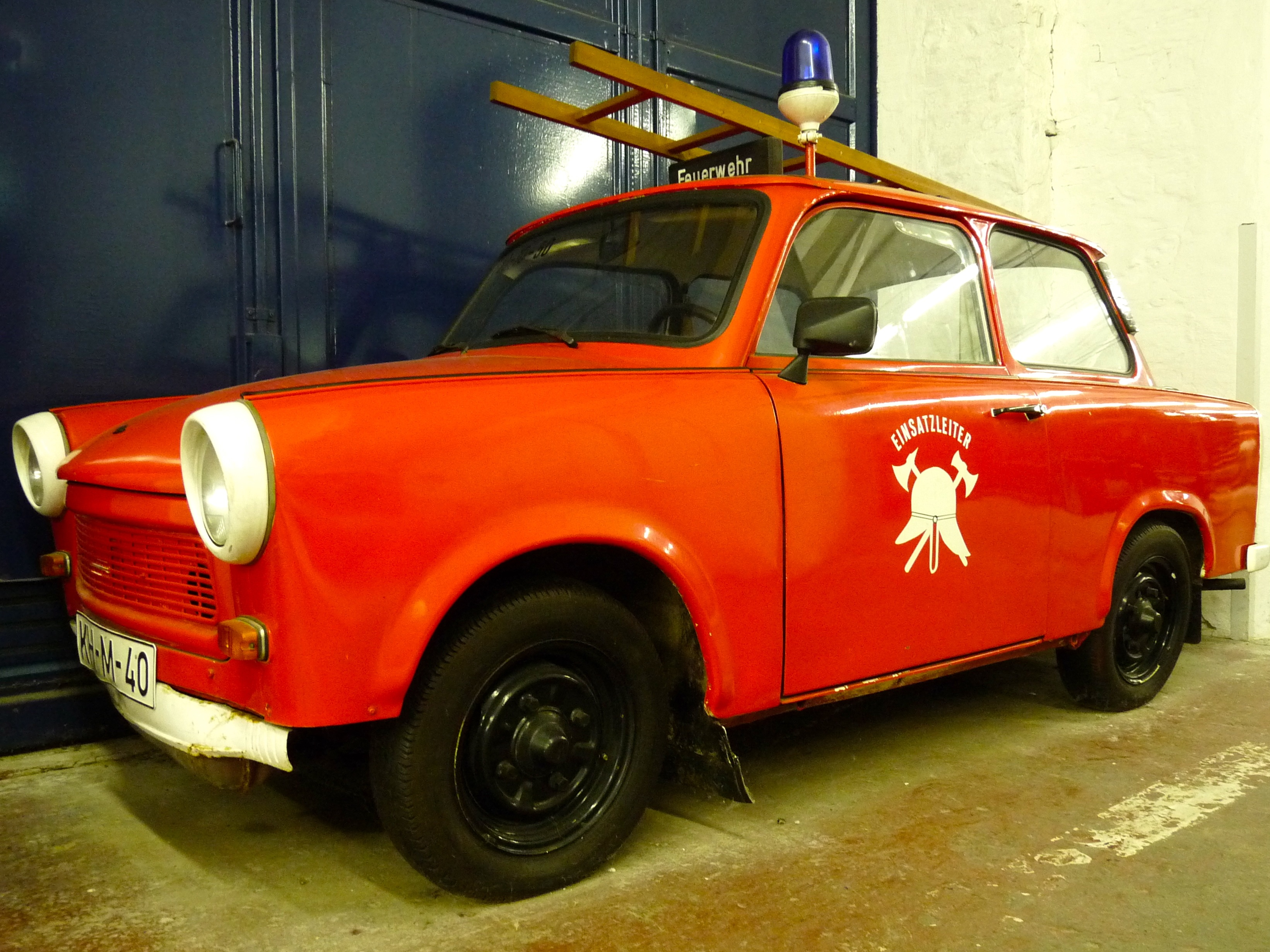
An operations leading vehicle (ELW) in the Oldtimer Museum Rügen

The development of fire vehicles in East Germany began in 1949 with the presentation of various models. Production of fire vehicles in East Germany began in 1951 in the VEB Phänomen Werk in Zittau. The VEB Horch Automobilwerk in Zwickau began production two years later in 1953.

Following the war, there was no production of turntable ladders in East Germany until the Ministry of the Interior ordered VEB Feuerlöschgerätewerk Luckenwalde to begin production in 1955. Large-scale production of turntable ladders in East Germany began in 1962.

Emergency vehicles in East Germany at the time were subject to strict regulation in accordance with TGL (comparable to DIN).

There were three main locations for the production of fire service vehicles in East Germany:

- In Luckenwalde: the successor of the company Koebe, the VEB Feuerlöschgerätewerk Luckenwalde (now Rosenbauer)
- In Görlitz: The VEB Feuerlöschgerätewerk Görlitz, formerly the company G.A. Fischer
- In Jöhstadt: the VEB Feuerlöschgerätewerk Jöhstadt, the successor of the company Flader.

=== Fire engines today ===
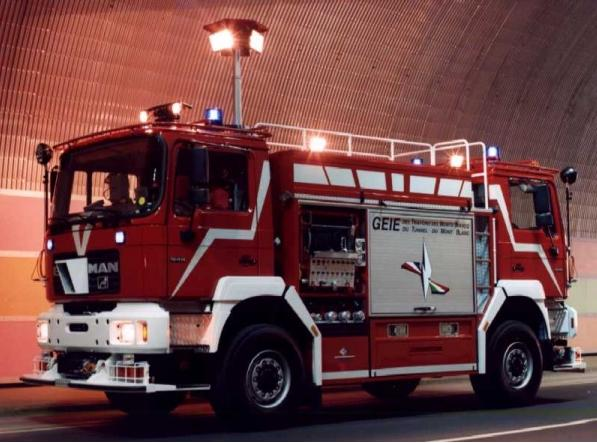
Tunnel fire engine with 2 cabs, made by the company BAI

Over time, the variety of both standardized and non-standardized fire vehicles makes it increasingly difficult to assess their operational value. As a result, different size variations of the same vehicle are frequently consolidated into the same classification.

Nowadays, the largest manufacturers of fire engines and fire service vehicles in Germany are Magirus, Metz Aerials, Rosenbauer, Schlingmann and Ziegler. In addition, there are many smaller body manufacturers such as BAI, ITURRI Feuerwehr- und Umwelttechnik, and Lentner.

== See also ==
- German Fire Services
- Fire department

== Literature ==
- Feuerwehrfahrzeuge Teil I. Die Roten Hefte (11 ed.). Kohlhammer. 1996. ISBN 978-3-17-013954-1.
- Feuerwehrfahrzeuge Teil II. Die Roten Hefte (11 ed.). Kohlhammer. 1996. ISBN 978-3-17-014285-5.
- Wolfgang Jendsch: Feuerwehrfahrzeuge in Europa. Haus Verlag, 1991, ISBN 978-3-88776-048-9.
- Wolfgang Jendsch: BRAND – Die Feuerwehren der Welt. Weltrundschau Verlag, diverse Beiträge über Feuerwehrfahrzeuge aus aller Welt in den einzelnen Buchausgaben.
- Wolfgang Jendsch: Feuerwehren – Spezialfahrzeuge aus aller Welt. Motorbuch Verlag, 2006, ISBN 978-3-613-02601-8.
- Wolfgang Jendsch: Moderne Feuerwehrfahrzeuge aus aller Welt. Motorbuch Verlag, 2009, ISBN 978-3-613-02601-8.
- Wolfgang Jendsch: Feuerwehr-Einsatzfahrzeuge – Waldbrandbekämpfung. Motorbuch Verlag, 2009, ISBN 978-3-613-03033-6.
- Walter Hamilton, Ulrich Kortt, Rolf Schmid: Handbuch für den Feuerwehrmann. 20. Auflage. Boorberg Verlag, 2004, ISBN 978-3-415-03176-0.
- Hans Kemper: Fahrzeugkunde. Ecomed Verlag, ISBN 978-3-609-62105-0.
- Landesfeuerwehrschule Baden-Württemberg: Maschinist für Löschfahrzeuge. Neckar-Verlag, 2002, ISBN 978-3-7883-1966-3.
- Axel Johanßen: Buchreihe Fahrzeuge der Feuerwehr (2008/2009 aktuell: Band 11, ISBN 978-3-939673-04-0, FdFw-Verlag, Köln).
- Axel Johanßen: Deutsche Feuerwehrfahrzeuge von 1990 bis heute. Bassermann-Verlag, 2007, ISBN 978-3-8094-2175-7.
- Udo Paulitz: Buchreihe Alte Feuerwehren. Franckh-Kosmos, Stuttgart.
- Manfred Gihl: Geschichte des deutschen Feuerwehrfahrzeugbaus, Band 1, Von den Anfängen bis 1940: Wie die Feuerwehren mobil wurden. Kohlhammer Verlag, Stuttgart 1996, ISBN 978-3-17-014289-3.
- Manfred Gihl: Geschichte des deutschen Feuerwehrfahrzeugbaus, Band 2, Von 1940 bis heute: Wie die Feuerwehren mobil sind. Kohlhammer Verlag, Stuttgart 2000, ISBN 978-3-17-014290-9.
