= Water flow test =

A water flow test, also known as a hydrant flow test, is a way to measure the water supply available at a building site, usually for the purposes of installing a water based fire protection system (fire sprinkler system).

The most common test involves measuring the flow of water flowing out of a municipal fire hydrant (measured in litres or gallons per minute) while recording how much the water pressure has dropped (from no water flow to test flow). When the results are collected carefully, formulas can be applied to figure the varying pressure(s) that will be available when different amounts of water flow are used from the same source. A process to perform a water flow test is explained in the model fire codes as published by NFPA (National Fire Protection Association).

If a water supply source is considered weak compared to what is required by the sprinkler system design hydraulic calculation, the water pressure can be boosted by means of a fire pump.

== General testing procedure ==
A set of three water pressure measurements are recorded from two hydrants. One hydrant is known as the residual hydrant or test hydrant and is located on or near the water main where a new water connection is desired. From this test hydrant, a static pressure and a residual pressure will be measured. The other hydrant, known as the flow hydrant, is usually the nearest hydrant away from the test hydrant. The flow hydrant is fitted with a diffuser device containing a pitot tube that measures stagnation pressure in the middle of the stream while the hydrant is flowing. First, a static pressure gauge is attached to the test hydrant and the static water pressure is measured at the test hydrant. Second, the flow hydrant opened to allow water to flow in a fully open condition. Simultaneously the pitot tube pressure is recorded from the flow hydrant while the residual pressure is measured from the test hydrant. These three pressures, the static pressure, the stagnation pressure, and the residual pressure, along with a specified design pressure of 20psi taken from the American Water Works Association (AWWA) or the NFPA are input into the Hazen-Williams formula to calculate the available flow for fire protection.

== The residual flow formula ==
$$Q_f = 29.84{c}{d^2}\sqrt{p}$$

where:

- Q_{f} = total residual flow during the test (gallons per minute)
- c = discharge coefficient (unitless). This is usually 1.0 if using a diffuser. If using a wand to measure the stagnation pressure, the coefficient value depends on the shape of the flow hydrant orifice. A smooth and rounded outlet has c=0.9, a square and sharp outlet has c=0.8, and a square outlet which projects into the barrel has c=0.7.
- d = diameter of the outlet (inches)
- p = stagnation pressure or pitot pressure (velocity head) (pounds per square inch)

== The Hazen-Williams formula for flow testing ==
$$Q_r = Q_f \cdot \frac{{ ( P_s - P_d} ) ^{0.54}}{{ (P_s - P_r}) ^{0.54}}$$

where:

- Q_{r} = flow predicted at specified or design residual pressure (gallons per minute)
- Q_{f} = total residual flow during the test (gallons per minute)
- P_{s} = stagnation pressure measured during test (pounds per square inch)
- P_{d} = design or specified residual pressure (usually 20 pounds per square inch)
- P_{r} = residual pressure measured during test (pounds per square inch)
