= Hilfeleistungslöschgruppenfahrzeug =

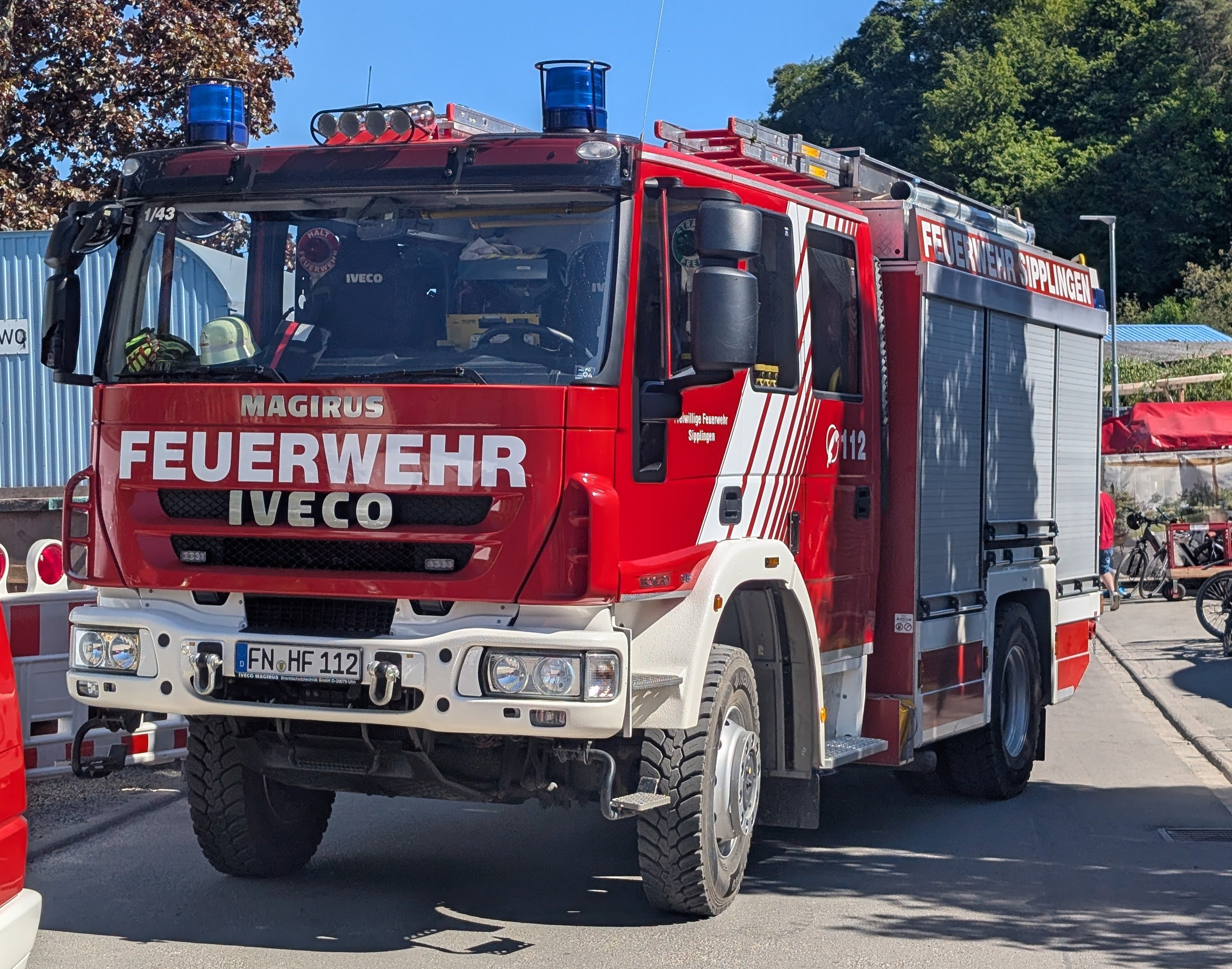
A Hilfeleistungslöschgruppenfahrzeug 10 (HLF 10) from the Sipplingen Volunteer Fire Department

The Hilfeleistungslöschgruppenfahrzeug (HLF) is a type of German fire vehicle of various sizes. Externally, the HLF is almost identical to the Löschgruppenfahrzeug (LF) and seats 9 (a "group"). The main difference compared to the LF is the extensive technical assistance equipment.

In Berlin, certain vehicles can be referred to as a Lösch-Hilfeleistungsfahrzeug or Lösch-Hilfeleistungs-Fahrzeug (LHF). In Hesse, the non-DIN-standardized Hilfeleistungstanklöschfahrzeug was used as a combination of an HLF and a TLF (water tender). In Hamburg, the designation "HLF" is used for „Hamburger Löschfahrzeuge“ (Hamburg Fire Engines). These vehicles are extremely similar to the classic HLF. In Munich and some parts of Baden-Württemberg and Thuringia, the designation "HLF" is used to mean „Hilfeleistungslöschfahrzeug“, as the seating arrangement fits a "Staffel" (7 people) instead of a "Gruppe" (9 people).

== Tasks ==
HLFs are the most versatile vehicles in German firefighting. They evolved from Löschgruppenfahrzeugen (LFs) as German fire departments began experiencing a continual increase in technical assistance calls and therefore equipped their fire engines with additional equipment for accident assistance. Even before their standardization, HLFs were the most versatile piece of fire service equipment in Germany, being used for nearly every conceivable situation, including but not limited to vehicle accidents, hazardous materials incidents, and, of course, conventional fire calls.

== History ==
The HLF is a comparatively young vehicle category among German fire departments; DIN standards have only existed for it since the start of the 21st century. Previously, many fire departments used their own designs, which typically lacked of any kind of standardization. Custom designs that fell outside the usual standards for tank fire engines (TLFs), portable pump vehicles, and LFs, would often be called Hilfeleistungslöschfahrzeuge (HLFs). In 1968/69, truck manufacturer Magirus-Deutz developed the first prototype of the HLF in collaboration with the Frankfurt am Main fire department. The vehicle was a combination of the Löschgruppenfahrzeug LF 16 and the Rüstwagen RW 1 rescue vehicle, and was based on the cab-over-engine 170D11 chassis. The first two units were delivered in 1969.

The first standardization for the HLF 20/16 (now the HLF 20) in November 2004 was intended to serve as a compromise between the LF 16/12 and the non-standardized special-purpose designs. In 2007, the HLF 10/6 (now the HLF 10) was created based on the former standard for the LF 8/6 with additional equipment for technical rescue.

In the abbreviations, the first number indicates the rated output of the fire pump in units of 100 L/min (26 U.S. gal/min) at 10 bar (150 psi) of delivery pressure; In the former names, the number after the slash indicated the standard (minimum) volume of the water tank in units of 100 L (26 US gal).

In practice, vehicles with much larger water tanks also appeared later (such as the HLF 20/20 with a 2,000 L (530 US gal) tank), but these were typically still classified under the respective types listed below. With the new abbreviations, this distinction has become obsolete.

== Types ==
Hilfeleistungslöschgruppenfahrzeug 10 (HLF 10)
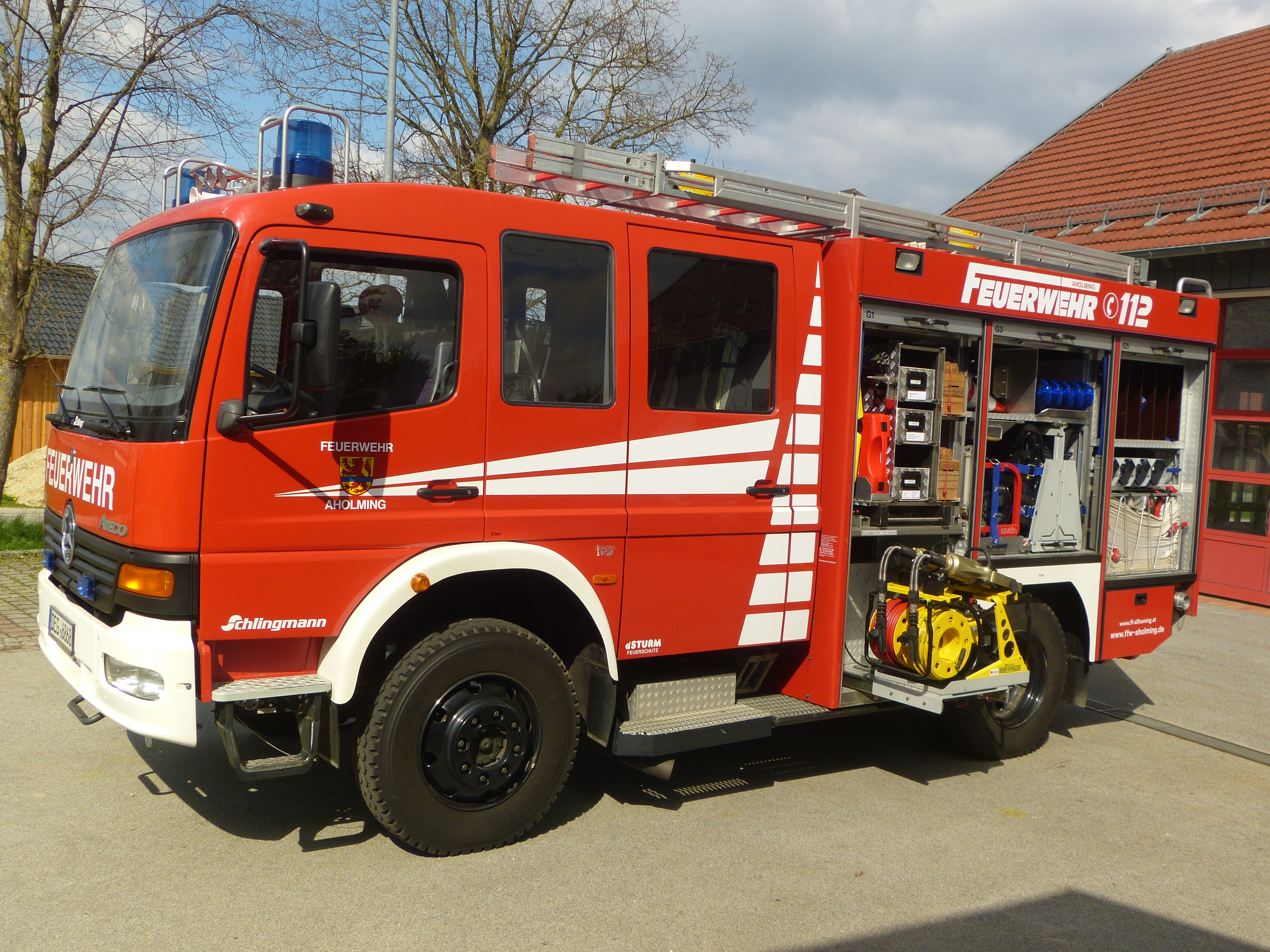
- Type: Fire engine
- Place of origin: Germany

Specifications
- Mass: 12,000 kilograms (26,000 lb)
- Crew: 0/1/8/9 (1 Gruppenführer, 8 crewmembers)
- Passengers: 9

=== Hilfeleistungslöschgruppenfahrzeug 10 (HLF 10) ===
The Hilfeleistungslöschgruppenfahrzeug 10 (HLF 10) is the smallest of the HLF classifications. From 2007 to 2012, it was called the HLF 10/6 and was standardized together with the former LF 10/6 in DIN 14530, Part 5. It is now standardized in DIN 14530 Part 26. Under the new standard, its equipment includes a water tank with a capacity of 1,000 L (260 US gal), as well as 120 L (32 US gal) of foaming agent. At the rear of the vehicle is a centrifugal fire pump with a delivery capacity of 1,000 L/min (260 U.S. gal/min) at a pressure of 10 bar (150 psi).

The HLF 10 is closely related to the Löschgruppenfahrzeug 10 (LF10), but may not necessarily have certain things such as a positive-pressure ventilator or a chimney toolbox. As set by the standard, a HLF 10 shall carry a 4-part extension ladder (or alternatively, two multi-purpose ladders), four SCBA units, a breathing apparatus monitoring system, two smoke hoods, a generator, lighting equipment, a vehicle accident toolbox, a small decontamination kit, a TP 4/1 submersible pump, a sabre saw, and a chainsaw. In addition to these items, the vehicle carriesfurther extensive equipment for technical rescue operations. For example, the HLF 10 has a hydraulic rescue set with a rescue spreader, rescue shearsee, and various accessories.

In Bavaria, the all-wheel-drive version of the LF/HLF 10 may have a permitted gross weight of 13 metric tons (14 short tons).

Hilfeleistungslöschgruppenfahrzeug 10/10

In Rhineland-Palatinate, the firefighting accident funds issued a requirement that a fire department may only carry out an interior attack without a stable water supply if it has at least 1,000 litres (260 US gal) of water available on scene. As a result, the Hilfeleistungslöschgruppenfahrzeug 10/10 (HLF 10/10) was created. The vehicle was essentially a standard HLF 10, but with a minimum tank capacity of 1,000 litres (260 US gal). With the new DIN-standard for the HLF 10, this requirement is no longer necessary.

=== Hilfeleistungslöschgruppenfahrzeug 20 (HLF 20) ===
Hilfeleistungslöschgruppenfahrzeug 20 (HLF 20)
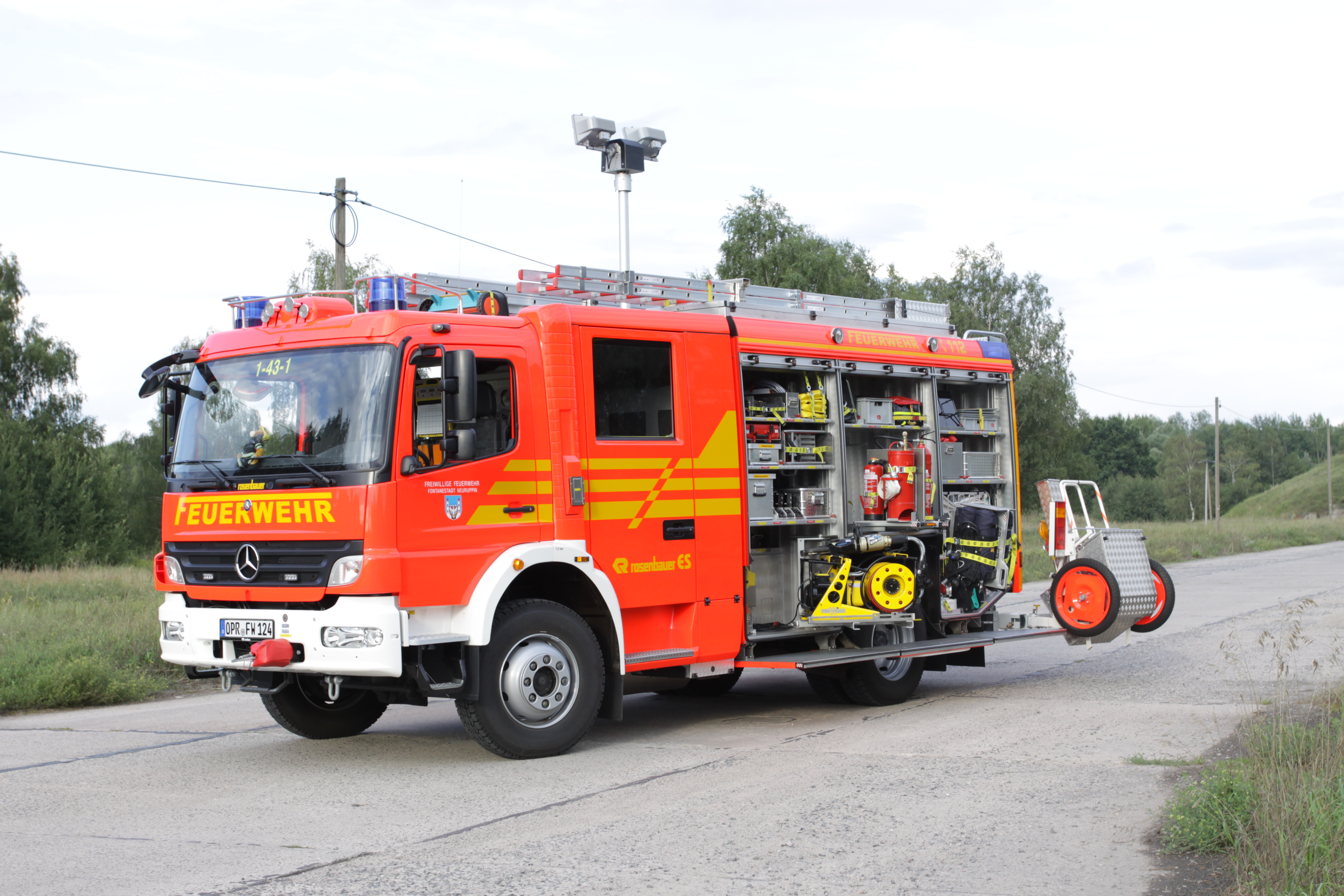
- HLF 20
- Type: Fire engine
- Place of origin: Germany

Specifications
- Mass: 16,000 kilograms (35,000 lb)
- Crew: 0/1/8/9 (1 Gruppenführer, 8 crewmembers)
- Passengers: 9

The Hilfeleistungslöschgruppenfahrzeug 20 (HLF 20) is the bigger of the HLF classifications and accordingly carries more equipment than the HLF 10. Since 2004, it was standardized as the HLF 20/16 together with the former LF 20/16 in DIN 14530 Part 11. The current, slightly modified standard is DIN 14530 Part 27. The HLF 20's equipment includes a 1,600 L (420 US gal) water tank, 120 L (32 US gal) of foaming agent, and 12 kg (26 lb) of extinguishing powder. The truck's centrifugal fire pump can pump 2,000 L/min (530 U.S. gal/min) at a pressure of 10 bar (150 psi).

The HLF 20 typically has a smaller water tank compared to the Löschgruppenfahrzeug 20 (LF20) but has a much more extensive array of technical assistance and vehicle extrication equipment. For example, the HLF 20 has, among other things, a full hydraulic rescue set (including a rescue spreader, rescue shears, and a set of hydraulic rescue rams), a vehicle accident toolbox, and typically, pneumatic lifting tools. The vehicle's firefighting equipment is almost identical to that of the LF 20. This includes water-carrying fittings, two smoke hoods, a 4-part extension ladder (or alternatively, two multi-purpose ladders), a three-part extension ladder, and a jump-rescue device. Likewise, four SCBA units, a breathing apparatus monitoring system, two manhole covers, four light hazmat suits, a power supply and lighting equipment, a TP 4/1 submersible pump, a chainsaw, and a sabre saw must be carried. Unlike the LF 10 and LF 20, the HLF 20 needs neither a positive-pressure ventilator nor a chimney toolbox. Additionally, the HLF 20 can be equipped with a mechanical winch, extra equipment for dealing with water damage, fall protection, hazardous materials cleanup, and in rare cases sometimes a portable pump. The vehicle can have all-wheel-drive and has a permitted gross weight of 16 metric tons (18 short tons).

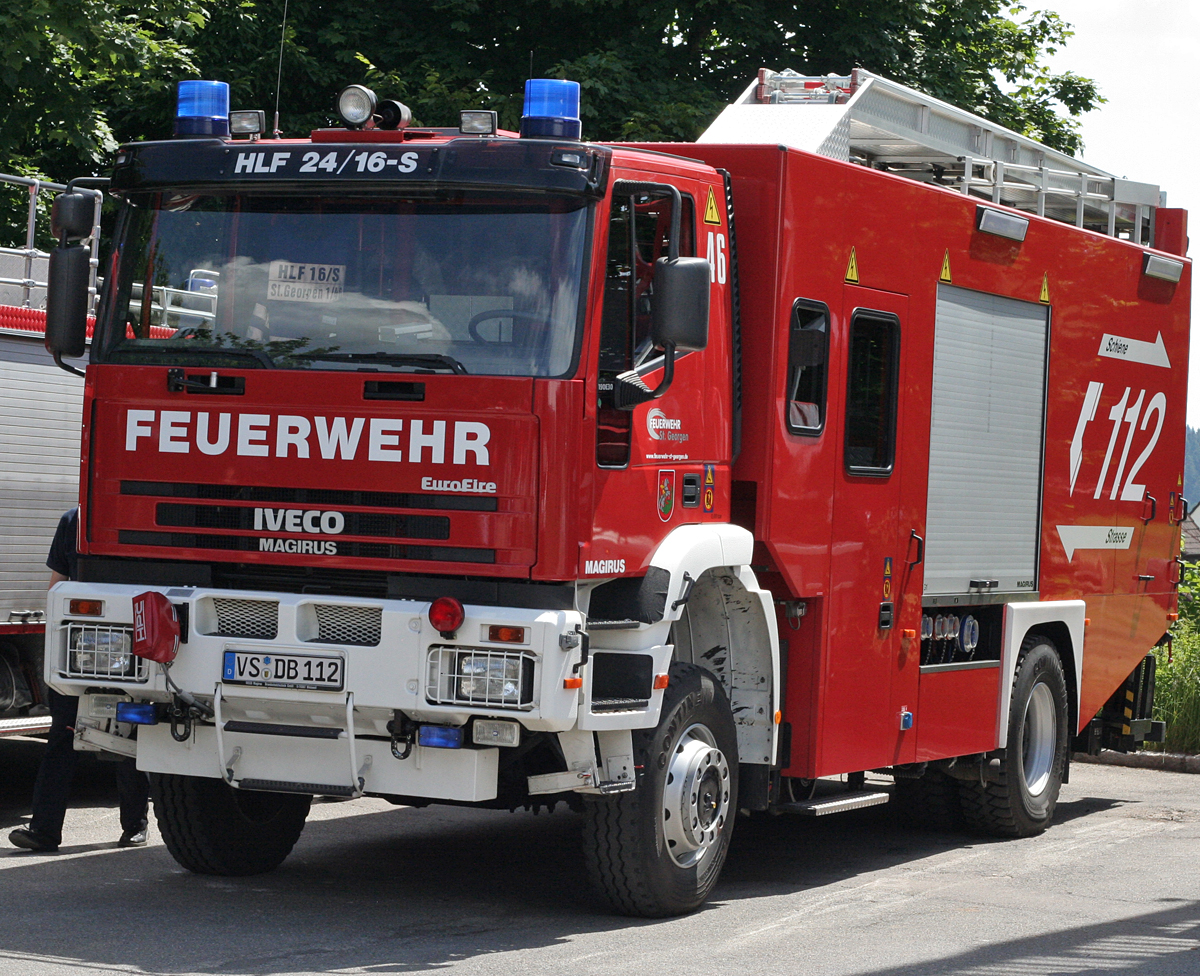
HLF24-14-S

=== Hilfeleistungslöschfahrzeug 24/14-Schiene ===
The HLF 24/14-S is a non-standardized special purpose fire engine that is found mainly in professional fire departments and is specially equipped for rail accidents. For this reason, it can also travel on railway tracks.

It usually has a water tank holding over 1,400 L (370 US gal) and, in addition to conventional firefighting, is also suitable for firefighting in tunnel systems and for technical rescue operations on train tracks.

== Literature ==
- Hamilton: Handbuch für den Feuerwehrmann. Boorberg-Verlag, ISBN 978-3-415-01705-4.
- Cimolino, Zawadke: Einsatzfahrzeuge für Feuerwehr und Rettungsdienst (Typen). Ecomed Sicherheit, ISBN 978-3-609-68667-7.
- Aktuelles Grundwissen Feuerwehr (22 ed.). Wenzel Verlag UG. 2025. ISBN 978-3-88293-222-5.
- Ausbildung der Freiwilligen Feuerwehren (FwDV 2), Neckar-Verlag Villingen-Schwenningen 2016, ISBN 978-3-7883-5964-5.
