= Hydraulic calculation =

Water transportation and distribution networks require hydraulic calculations to determination the flowrate and pressure characteristics at one or several consumption points and the water supply flowrate and pressures needed to meet the design requirements.

In the context of fire safety, hydraulic calculations are used to determine the flow of an extinguishing medium through a piping network and through discharge devices (e.g., nozzles, sprinklers) to control, suppress, or extinguish fires.

== Fire safety calculations ==
Hydraulic calculations verify that the water flowrate (or water mixed with additives like firefighting foam concentrate) through piping networks for the purpose of suppressing or extinguishing a fire will be sufficient to meet design objectives. The hydraulic calculation procedure is defined in the applicable reference model codes such as that published by the US-based National Fire Protection Association (NFPA), or the EN 12845 standard, Fixed firefighting system – Automatic sprinkler systems – Design, installation and maintenance.

Hydraulic calculations indicate that the combination of the two primary components of a water based fire protection system will meet the design objectives to control, suppress, or extinguish a fire:

- The available water supply is sufficient in flowrate and pressure.
- The pipe sizes and piping network arrangement that deliver the water to the outlets (e.g., sprinklers) are sized and arranged adequately.

=== Water delivery requirements ===
Requirements for the quantity of water discharge are specified by an applicable model code such as NFPA 13, NFPA 15, EN 12845, BS 9251, NFPA 750 CP 52, ASIB, and AS2118.1. Property insurance design standards may also apply.

The probable intensity and extent of a fire inside the building are indicated by factors including the building use, the building height, the items contained inside the building and their arrangement. These variables are compared to tables and values expressed in the model codes. The values in these tables are based on fire tests and loss history.

=== Available water supply ===
The water available is often determined by means of a water flow test, in which one or more fire hydrants are opened and the water pressures and flowrate are measured. Some municipal water jurisdictions may provide an estimate of available water supplies based on hydraulic models.

In locations where a municipal connection is not possible or practical, the required water may be drawn from an open body of water (e.g., lake, pond, river) or a water storage tank.

Hydraulic calculations determine if the available water supply pressure is adequate to provide the sprinkler system design flowrate. If not, additional water pressure is provided by a fire pump.

=== System piping network ===
Suppression system piping networks are usually arranged in one of 3 configurations: Tree, Loop, or Grid. All of these types of systems utilize large horizontal pipes - "mains" - which deliver large flowrates to smaller pipes - "branch lines" - which are connected to the mains. Sprinklers are installed only on the branch pipes. The mains are supplied with water by connection to a single vertical pipe - "riser" - which is in turn provided with water by connection to water supply piping.

Tree systems includes a single main pipe with several smaller branch lines. As all pipes terminate at a dead end, water flowrate is possible only in one direction.

Looped systems utilize a main that runs a significant distance into a building and is routed back to connect to itself near the riser. Branch lines are connected to this 'loop'. Less water supply pressure is required with this looped main configuration as the hydraulic pressure drop is lower through the main as water can flow in two directions to any sprinkler. The branch lines may terminate in a dead end or may connect at each end to different (usually opposite) points on the looped main. In the latter case, less water supply pressure is required as the hydraulic pressure drop is lower in the branch pipe as water flows from both ends of the branch line to any sprinkler.

Grid systems utilizes two large mains at opposite ends of several branch lines which are connected to the mains at each end. Gridded systems provide multiple paths for the water to travel to any point in the system, reducing pressure losses in the system.

Most design standards require application of the Hazen-Williams method for determining frictional pressure losses through the piping network as water passes through it. Tree and Loop systems are simple enough that the hydraulic calculations could be performed by hand. Because hydraulic calculations for gridded systems require an iterative process to balance the water flow through all possible water paths, these calculations are most often performed by computer software. In practice, most calculations on all types of piping networks are performed by computer software. The sizes of network components can be more readily modified and recalculated on a computer than through a manual process.

The 2013 NFPA 13 handbook includes a supplement which describes some of the application theory and processes applied when performing hydraulic calculations.
