= Fire pump =

Firefighting equipment

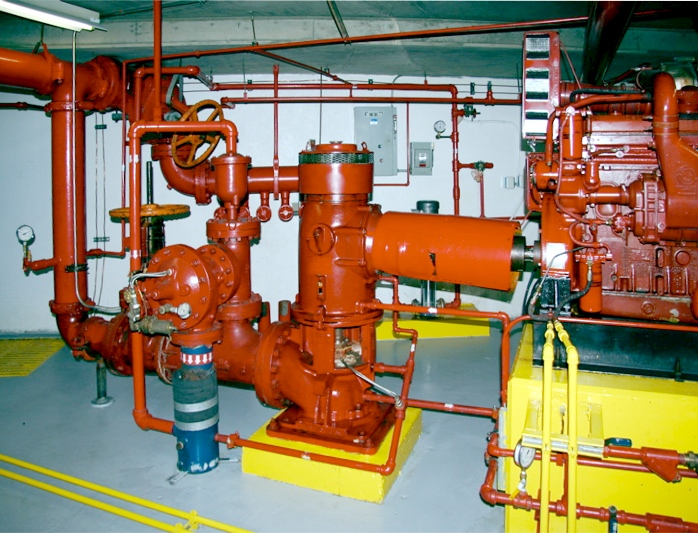
A vertical turbine type fire pump with a diesel engine attached on the right

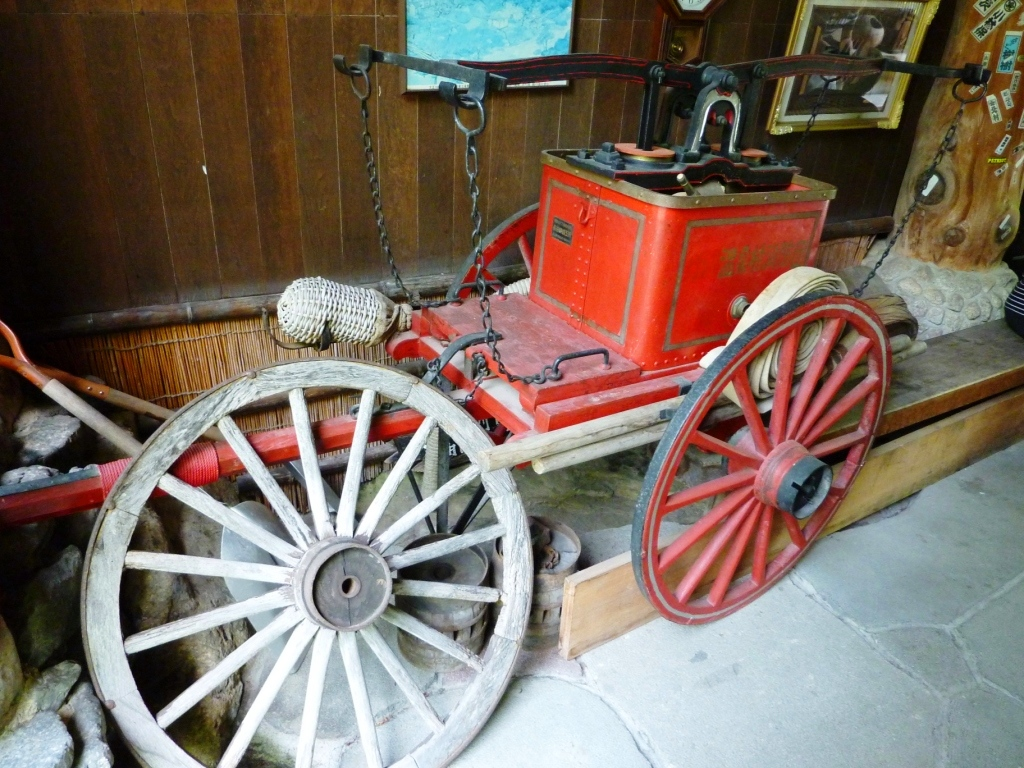
Antique Japanese fire pump

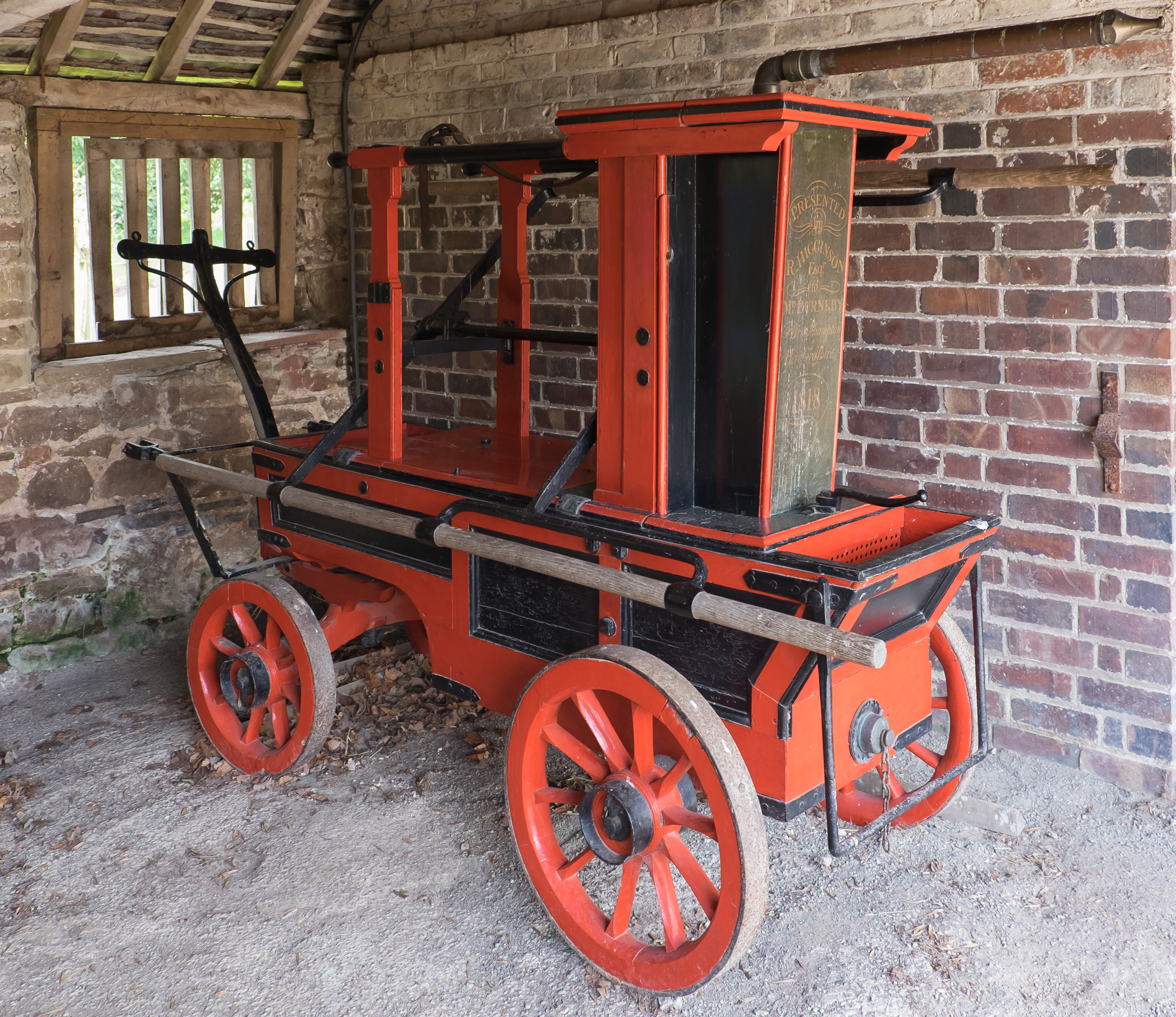
Horse-drawn fire pump given to Brockhampton Estate in 1818

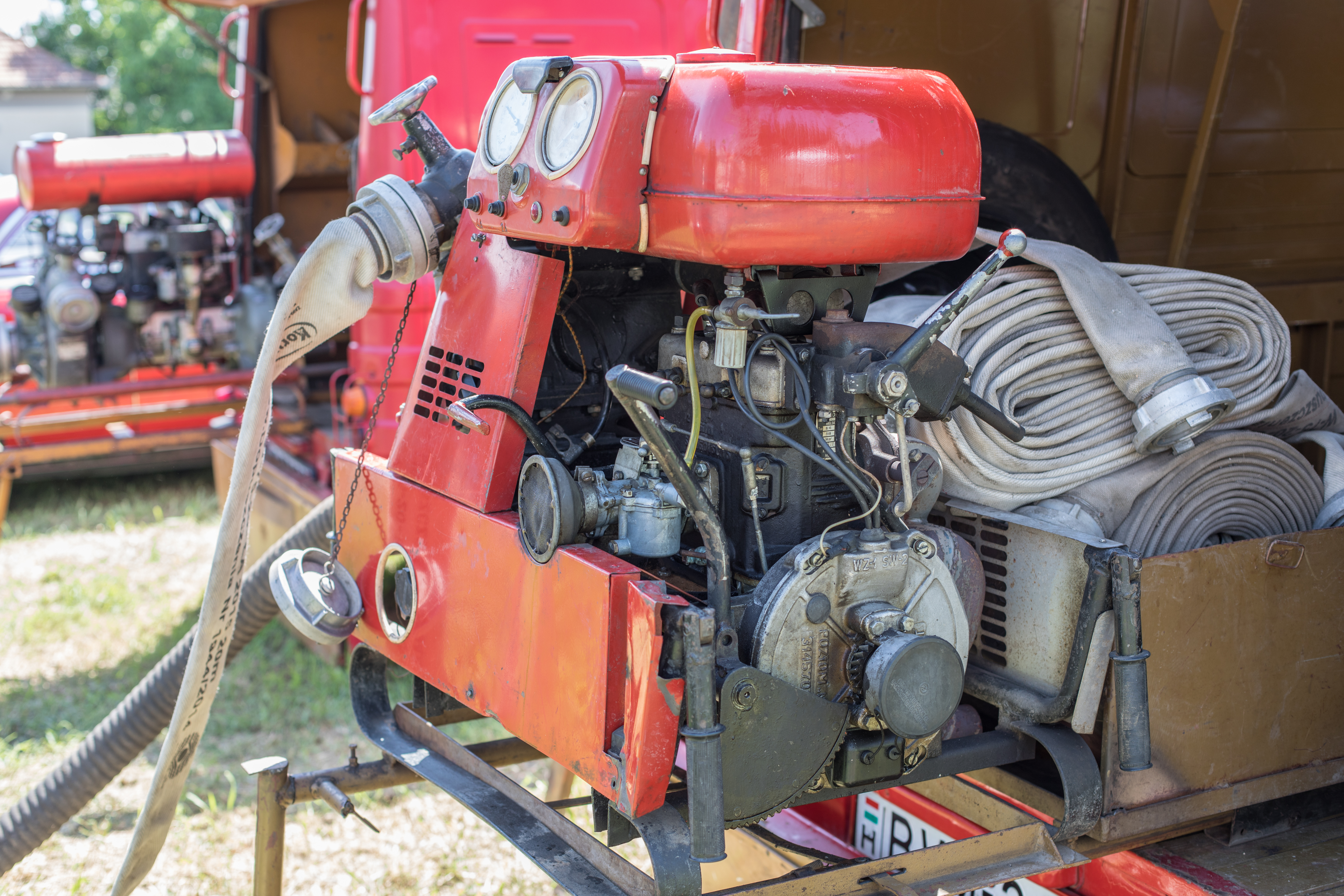
The portable fire pump normal pressure (PFPN) was standard equipment in many Żuk A-15 fire engines; ca. 1977

A fire pump usually refers to a pressure-increasing component of the water supply for fixed-place fire suppression systems such as fire sprinklers, standpipes, and foam systems. Fire pumps are also a critical component integrated into fire trucks and fire boats, and serve a similar purpose boosting water supplies for firefighting hose operations.

== Description ==
Fire pumps are used to increase the pressure of water sourced from a municipal underground water supply piping network, or a static supply (e.g., tank, reservoir, lake). A fire pump is a centrifugal- or positive displacement- pump that has been tested and listed by a third-party testing and listing agency, such as UL or FM Global specifically for fire service use. The main standard that governs fire pump fixed-place installations in North America is the National Fire Protection Association's NFPA 20 Standard for the Installation of Stationary Fire Pumps for Fire Protection.

Fire pumps are powered most commonly by an electric motor or a diesel engine, or, occasionally a steam turbine. If the governing model building code requires backup power independent of the local electric power grid, a fire pump using an electric motor may utilize an emergency generator when connected via a listed transfer switch. Fire pumps installed on fire trucks and boats are powered by the engine of the vehicle/vessel.

Utilizing a control panel with pressure sensors, fire pumps automatically start when the pressure in the fire sprinkler system drops below a pre-designated threshold. Given the incompressibility of water, fire suppression system pressures drops significantly and quickly when one or more outlets open. Examples would be fused (opened) fire sprinklers, fire hose valves connected to a standpipe, or automatic control valves opened by release panels.

Fire pumps are utilized when determined by hydraulic calculations that the existing water supply cannot provide sufficient pressure to meet the hydraulic design requirements of the suppression system. This usually occurs if the building is very tall, such as in high-rise buildings (to overcome hydraulic head losses created from elevation differences), in systems that require a relatively high terminal pressure at the fire suppression outlets (to provide sufficient water droplet penetration of a fire plume), or in systems that require a large discharge of water (such as storage warehouses). Fire pumps are also needed if fire protection water supply is provided from a static source which provides little or no pressure. Some situations may be compounded by all of these factors, requiring large water supplies and powerful fire pumps.

Common types of fire pumps used for fire service include: horizontal split case, vertical split case, vertical inline, vertical turbine, and end suction.

== Fire pumps, circulation relief valve ==
Each pump shall have a circulation relief valve listed for the fire pump service installed and set below the shutoff pressure at minimum expected suction pressure. Exception: This rule shall not apply to engine-driven pumps for which engine cooling water is taken from the pump discharge.

== Jockey pump ==
A jockey pump, also known as a pressure-maintenance pump, is a small pump connected to a fire suppression system near the fire pump and is intended to maintain pressure in a fire protection piping system. These pumps recover pressures lost from gradual, slow pressure declines in a system due to temperature changes, trapped air escapement, or very small leaks. The jockey pump is essentially a portion of the fire pump's control system. A jockey pump is sized for a flow less than one sprinkler in order to ensure a system pressure drop significant enough to start the main fire pump. Jockey pumps are typically small multistage centrifugal pumps, and do not have to be listed or certified for fire system application. The control equipment for jockey pumps may however carry approvals. Jockey pumps should be sized for 3% of the flow of the main fire pump and to provide 10psi more pressure than the main fire pump (As per Code IS 15105 : 2002)

In the United States, the application of a jockey pump in a fire protection system is provided by NFPA 20. They are inspected per NFPA 25 "Inspection and Testing of Water-Based Fire Protection Systems".

In India, the pump manufacturers generally adhere to the TAC (Tariff Advisory Committee) guidelines, although pump manufacturers also obtain listings with UL or FM Global. For the purpose of installation & maintenance of fire-fighting pumps, Bureau of Indian Standards has published IS 15301 which is being followed throughout India.
