= Berlin Fire Brigade =

Fire and rescue service for Berlin, Germany

Berliner Feuerwehr

Operational area
- Country: Germany
- City: Berlin

Agency overview
- Established: 1 February 1851
- Annual calls: 478,281 (2019)
- Employees: 4,479 (2019)
- Fire chief: Dr. Karsten Homrighausen
- Motto: Wir retten Berlin. Seit 1851. (lit. We save Berlin. Since 1851.)

Website
- www.berliner-feuerwehr.de

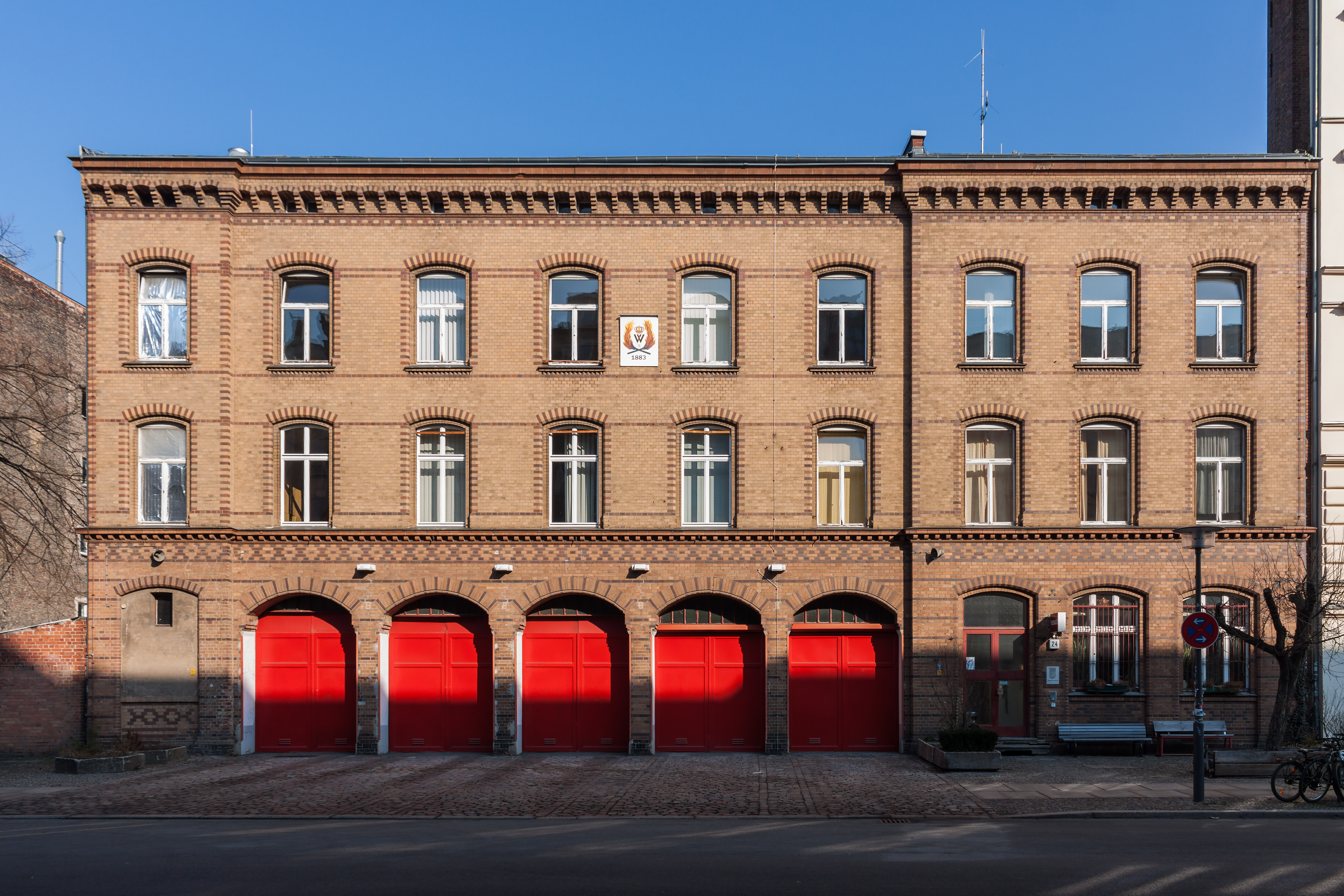
The Fire Station Prenzlauer Berg is the oldest operating professional fire station in Germany.

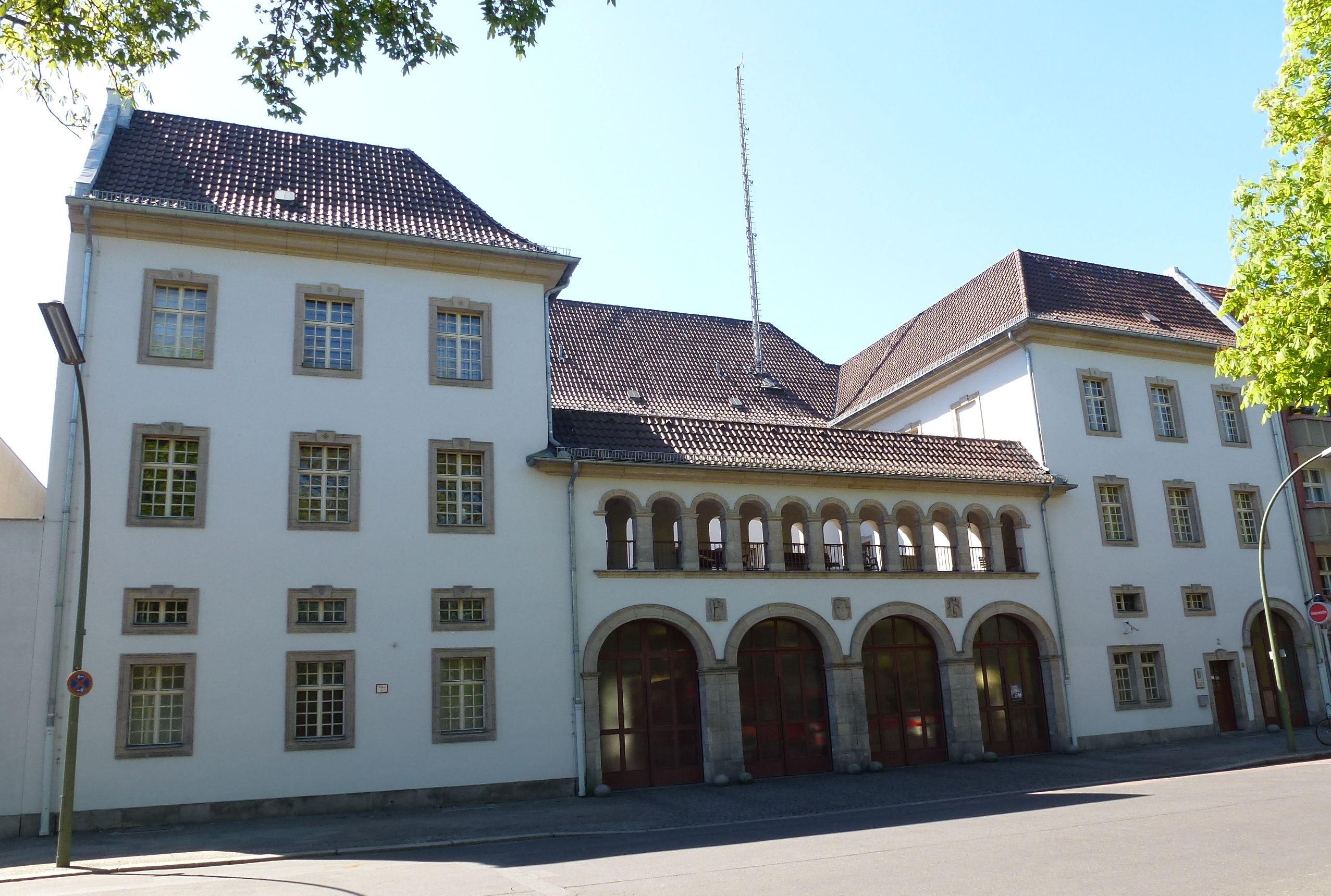
Under monumental protection. The Fire Station Schillerpark in Berlin-Wedding was built in 1909/1910.

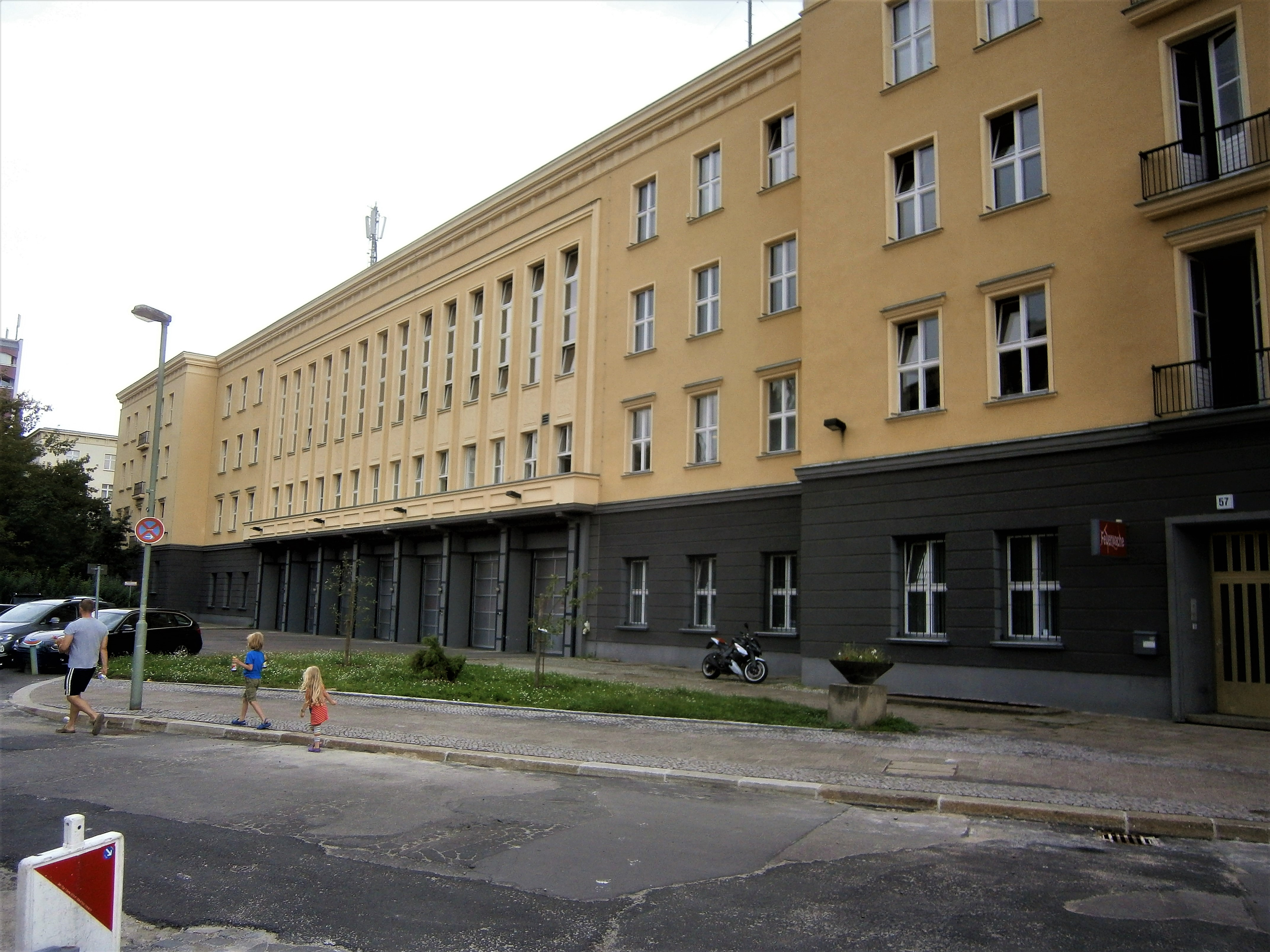
One of the busiest fire stations in Berlin, the Fire Station Friedrichshain.

The Berlin Fire Brigade (German: Berliner Feuerwehr - Berlin Fire Defence) is the fire and emergency medical service for Berlin, Germany. As well as firefighting, the Berlin Fire Brigade provides fire prevention, technical rescue services, emergency medical services, and assistance in case of chemical, biological, radioactive and nuclear hazards. (CBRN defense)

The brigade was officially formed on February 1, 1851, by Ludwig Scabell, under the command of King Frederick William IV. Since August 2018, the Berlin Fire Brigade is under the command of its Fire Chief, State Fire Director Dr. Karsten Homrighausen. Landesbranddirektor, short LBD, translates in German to State Fire Director.

The Berlin Fire Brigade is the oldest and largest municipal fire brigade in Germany. It has a total of 4,479 staff, including 4,082 operational firefighters and officers based at 35 main fire stations. It is supported by an additional 1,537 volunteer firefighters based at 59 volunteer fire stations. Freiwillige Feuerwehr - "Free Willing Fire Defence" is the term used for Volunteer Fire Stations. The Berlin Fire Brigade has an annual budget of around €250,000,000, which includes personnel costs and investments.

In 2019, Berlin Fire Defence received 478,281 emergency calls. It is the busiest of all fire services in Germany. Approximately 83% of the alarms per year are for the emergency services, 5% for technical assistance and only 2% for firefighting.

== History ==
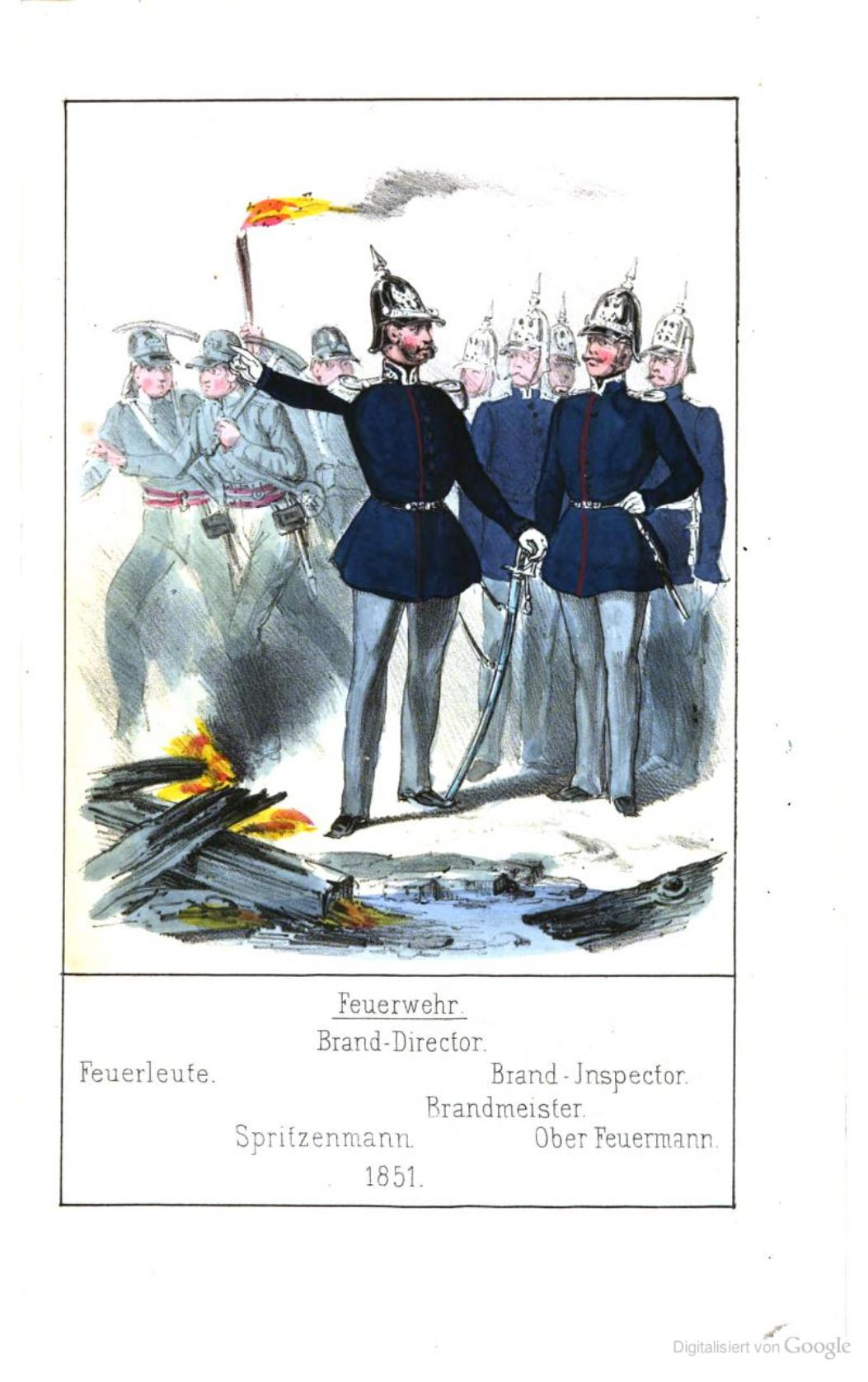
Berlin Fire Brigade around 1851

=== Industrialization and Wilhelminian period (1851-1899) ===
Back in the mid-19th century, Berlin suffered a series of devastating fires. The city grew rapidly and buildings became more and more crowded. Resources could no longer keep up with the size of the buildings. Therefore, The King of Prussia decided in 1851 to command Ludwig Scabell to set up a professional fire brigade and ensure its training and equipment . Scabell created the Berlin Fire Defence with the support of the former Berlin Police Chief Carl von Hickeldey. Within a very short period, almost 1,000 men were hired and trained while the professional fire stations were built. In the same year, the world's first electrical fire alarm network was installed in Berlin. The implementation was carried out by the German company Siemens & Halske. The innovation connected the headquarters at the Molkenmarkt with 24 fire stations and all police stations within the city. In 1854 the very first newly built fire station was opened, two years later a new water supply network with 1,520 hydrants went into operation in Berlin. Scabell retired in 1875 and was succeeded by Gustav Witte. In 1879 together, with the engineer and manufacturer Greiner, they received the German patent for the world's first turntable ladder. The Berlin Fire Brigade put their first turntable ladder, built by the German company BAMAG, into service at the main fire station in 1882.

=== Turn of the century, First World War and Weimar Republic (1900-1932) ===
In 1901 the International Fire Protection Exhibition took place in Berlin to mark the 50th anniversary of the professional fire brigade. In 1906 at the fire station in Berlin-Grunewald, the first gasoline fire truck in Germany equipped with a fire pump was put into service. In 1908 Berlin purchased its first electric fire engine. During the First World War from 1914 to 1918, seven hundred officers had to transfer from the Berlin Fire Brigade to the Wehrmacht, where part of the firefighters were deployed in the newly created flamethrower regiments.

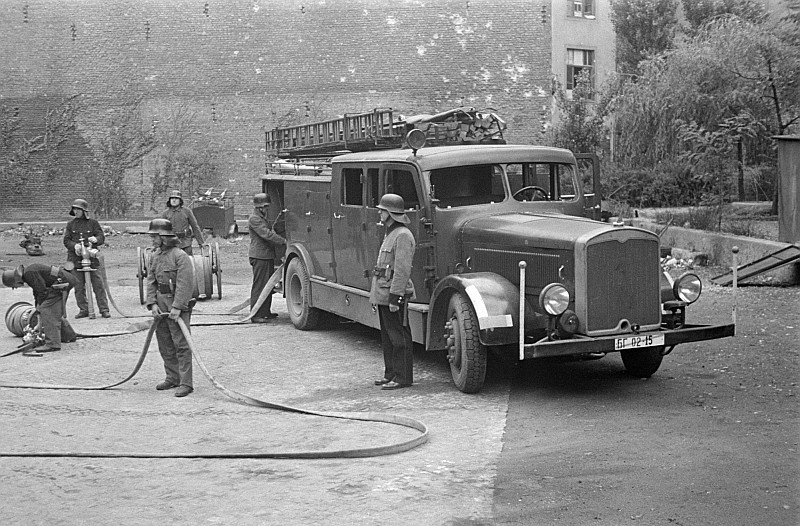
Berlin Fire Brigade in August 1945

=== National Socialism (1933-1945) ===
On December 15, 1933, the term Feuerlöschpolizei (lit. 'Firefighting Police') was introduced for all Prussian fire brigades. The fire brigades throughout the German Reich were placed under the Ordnungspolizei, abbreviated Orpo (lit. 'Order Police'), in 1938. These Brigades were called the Feuerschutzpolizei (lit. 'Fire Protection Police'). The previously red fire vehicles, blue uniforms and fire service ranks were replaced by green fire vehicles, green uniforms and police ranks. They were issued firearms and batons. With few exceptions, the Nazi-led fire protection police did not intervene in the November pogroms in 1938 when the synagogues in Berlin were set on fire.

=== One city - two fire brigades (1946-1990) ===
After the Second World War, six of the 38 professional fire stations were lost. Of the 51 volunteer fire stations, three were totally destroyed while twelve were only partially. On November 21, 1948, the Berlin Fire Defence was divided into two separate authorities in East and West Berlin. The first post-war fire stations were built on both sides during the 1950s. Technology and training in East and West developed separately. In 1952 the East Berlin Fire Brigade was incorporated into the Volkspolizei, abbreviated VoPo, (lit. 'German People's Police') as "Organ F" and issued firearms and batons. East Berlin also received a "west turntable ladder" to protect the massive buildings on Stalinallee, today known as Karl-Marx-Allee. The turntable ladder type DL 52 manufactured by Metz, with a rescue height of over 50 meters, had a car that could be used as an elevator. In the days after the Berlin Wall was built in 1961, the West Berlin Fire Brigade had to keep using its jumping blankets because people jumped from buildings on the demarcation line towards freedom in West Berlin. In 1969, the West Berlin Rescue Service was incorporated into the fire brigade. The Berliner Rettungsdienst was the ambulance service of Berlin. Since then, the West Berlin Fire Brigade has also been responsible for emergency medical services. In East Berlin, rescue and emergency medical services were carried out by the rescue office independently of the fire brigade until reunification. Since the early 1980s, the West Berlin fire brigade has repeatedly been involved in May riots in Berlin-Kreuzberg. A fire truck from the Berlin-Kreuzberg fire station was completely destroyed on the night of May 1, 1987.

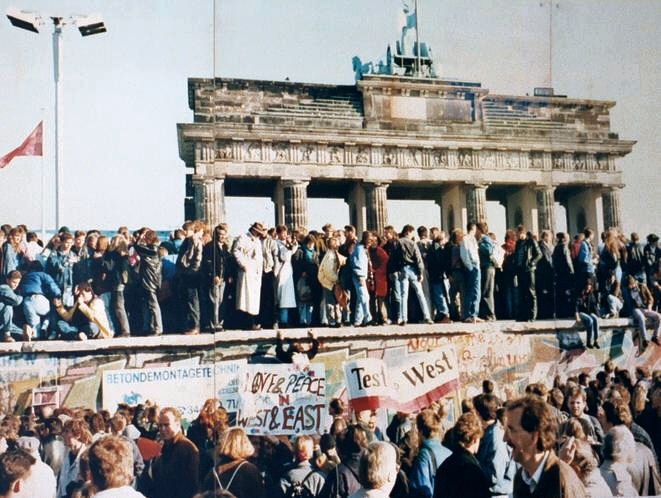
Germans stand on top of the Wall in front of Brandenburg Gate in the days before the Wall was torn down

=== Development since reunification ===
On October 3, 1990, the day of German reunification, "Organ F" the East Berlin Fire Brigade, was handed over to the West Berlin Fire Director Wolfgang Scholz. At that time, the fire brigades had a total staff of 3,788 in West Berlin and 1,112 in East Berlin. In 1992 W. Scholz retired and Albrecht Broemme was appointed as the new Fire Director of Berlin. In 1993/94, due to the high volume of urban traffic and the numerous new measures to calm the increase, new vehicle concepts were tested in the city districts. The firefighting vehicle LHF 16/12 City, short "City", was 2.2 m shorter, 20 cm narrower; and therefore, more agile than the conventional LHF 16 of the Berlin Fire Brigade. After the successful testing phase, 41 vehicles of this type were ordered from 1994 to 1997. On New Year's Eve 2000 there was a total failure of the IT control center, including the fallback level. For several hours it was not possible to place emergency calls. The vehicles were sent on patrols. There was only a marginal connection with the so-called Year 2000 problem. The affected operational control system FIS was replaced in 2000 by the more modern IGNIS and in 2017 by its successor IGNIS-Plus. In May 2006, Fire Director Albrecht Broemme became president of the Technisches Hilfswerk. The civil protection and disaster relief service of Germany. Initially, his deputy Wilfried Graefling became the temporary director and eventually the new Fire Director of Berlin in November 2006. Graefling left the Berlin Fire Brigade at the end of July 2018 and retired. His successor since August 1, 2018 is Karsten Homrighausen. In 2018, colleagues from the Berliner Fire Brigade protested in front of the Rotes Rathaus, the home to the governing mayor and the government (the Senate of Berlin) of the Federal state of Berlin. Firefighters protested under the catchphrase "BerlinBrennt" (lit. 'Berlin is Burning'). The causes included the increasing number of operations, inadequate equipment including vehicles and materials, as well as the lack of personnel. Before the reunification of Berlin in 1990, only West Berlin had more staff than the reunited city from West and East in 2018.

== Fire Chiefs ==
| Tenure | Name | Official Title |
|---|---|---|
| 1851–1875 | Ludwig Scabell | Branddirektor |
| 1875–1887 | Gustav Witte | Branddirektor |
| 1887–1893 | Alexander Stude | Branddirektor |
| 1893–1905 | Erich Giersberg | Branddirektor |
| 1905–1922 | Maximilian Reichel | Oberbranddirektor |
| 1922–1933 | Walter Gempp | Oberbranddirektor |
| 1933–1943 | Gustav Wagner | Generalmajor |
| 1943–1945 | Walter Goldbach | Generalmajor |
| 1945–1948 | Karl Feierabend | Oberbranddirektor (East Berlin until 1952) |
| 1949–1957 | Ludwig Wissell | Oberbranddirektor (West Berlin) |
| 1952–1963 | Ernst Ettrich | Oberst der Feuerwehr (East Berlin) |
| 1957–1968 | Friedrich Kaufhold | Oberbranddirektor (West Berlin) |
| 1963–1970 | Rudi Mösch | Oberst der Feuerwehr (East Berlin) |
| 1968–1970 | Heinz Hoene | Landesbranddirektor (West Berlin) |
| 1970–1990 | Horst Meier | Branddirektor (East Berlin) |
| 1970–1988 | Kurt-Werner Seidel | Landesbranddirektor (West Berlin) |
| 1989–1992 | Wolfgang Scholz | Landesbranddirektor |
| 1990 | Manfred Schäfer | Oberbrandrat (East Berlin) |
| 1992–2006 | Albrecht Broemme | Landesbranddirektor |
| 2006–2018 | Wilfried Gräfling | Landesbranddirektor |
| seit 2018 | Karsten Homrighausen | Landesbranddirektor |

== Special Operations ==
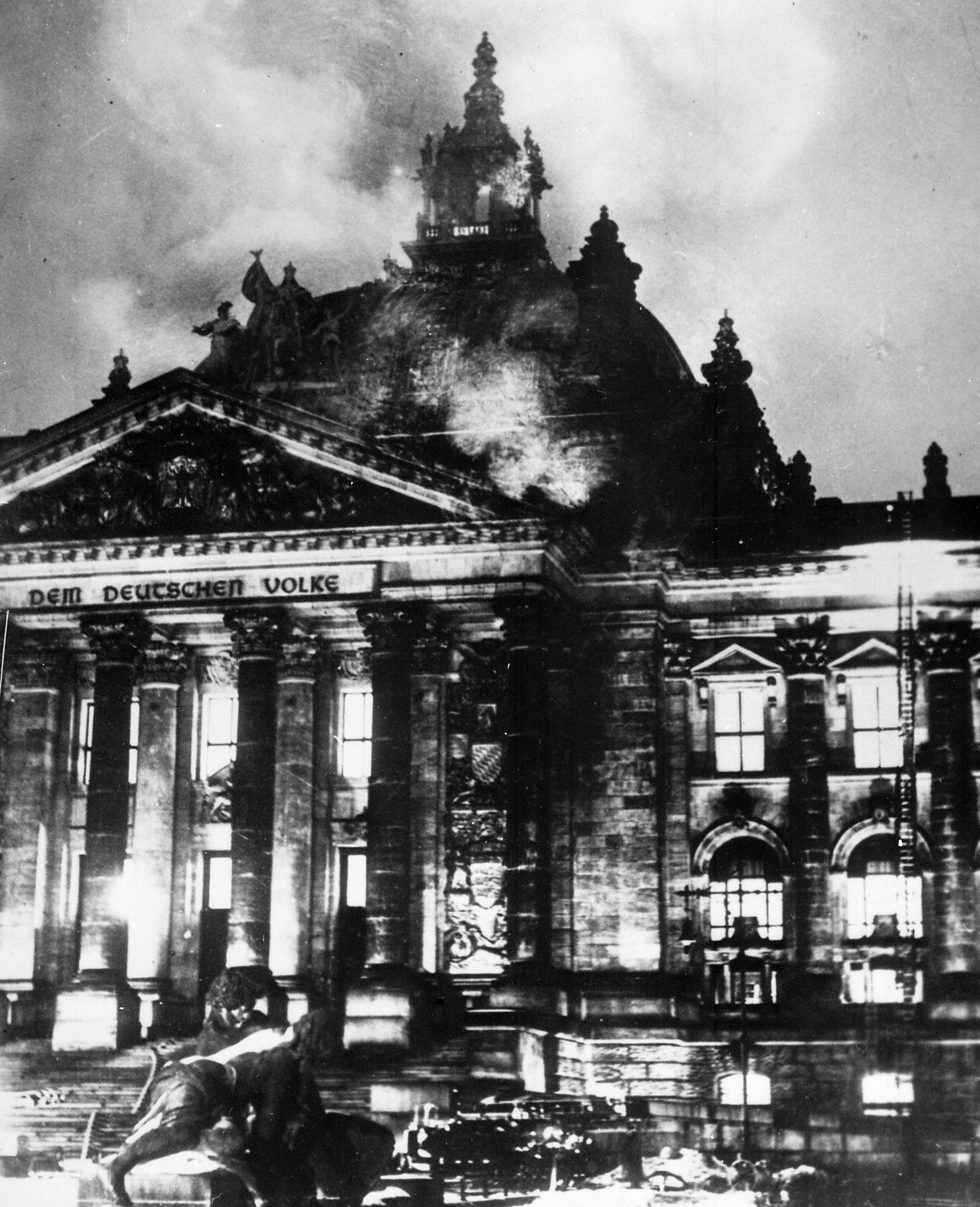
Reichstags fire on Monday 27 February 1933. Firefighters struggle to extinguish the fire

- September 26, 1908 - Two elevated railway trains collide at metro station Gleisdreieck - 18 dead
- February 27, 1933 – Reichstag fire (German parliament)
- May 21, 1980 - Partial collapse of the congress hall
- 1983 - Attack on the Maison de France
- April 5, 1986 - Attack on the La Belle discotheque - three dead (2 US soldiers, 1 Turkish civilian)
- 16–21 December 1989 - Fire in a building with three hotel pensions on Kurfürstendamm / corner of Wielandstrasse extends to the largest hotel fire in German post-war history - eight dead
- 1989/90 - Video wall collapsed at the New Year's Eve party at the Brandenburg Gate
- October 26, 1994 - Fire at the German Cathedral after welding work on the roof
- August 4, 1998 - Heavy gas explosion in Lepsiusstrasse
- July 8, 2000 - Fire in the underground station Deutsche Oper. 350 people had to be evacuated through a tunnel.
- July 10, 2002 - Hurricane "Anita" - worst storm in 30 years - 7 dead and 39 injured
- 18 / 19 January 2007 - Hurricane "Kyrill" - a total of 1.001 alarms
- December 19, 2016 – Terrorist attack on Breitscheidplatz - truck drives into the Christmas market - 12 dead and 53 injured
- 19/20 February 2019 - 36 hour power failure in the southeast of Berlin, evacuation of two hospitals, people from care facilities and from elevators. Maintenance of emergency care by mobile fire stations in cooperation with the police, the Red Cross and civil protection.
- 10/11 May 2020 - Several warehouses in Berlin-Tegel burned, the Berlin Fire Brigade was on site with over 300 emergency personnel. The fire was under control after about 19 hours, after 21 hours the last forces were able to move away.

== Legal basis and organization ==
According to § 3 of the Feuerwehrgesetz Berlin, also FwG Berlin, (lit. 'Fire Brigade Act Berlin'), the Berlin Fire Brigade has been commissioned to: fight fire, prevent danger, preventive fire protection, disaster protection and emergency services. The Freiwllige Feuerwehr (Engl: volunteer fire department) of the Berlin Fire Brigade are members of the Berlin Fire Brigade Association (LFV). The LFV Berlin is a member of the German Fire Brigade Association (DFV) based in Berlin. The Berlin Fire Brigade is also responsible for the Werkfeuerwehren and Betriebsfeuerwehren in Berlin. These private fire brigades belong to companies and protect special infrastructures. One example of a Werkfeuerwehr in Berlin is the Bayer AG Werkfeuerwehr in Berlin-Wedding. They are in close professional contact with the Berlin Fire Brigade and, with the exception of the Berufsfeuerwehren, can be alerted for special operations.

=== Museum ===
The fire brigade maintains its own museum located in Tegel. The museum shows the history of the Berlin Fire Brigade in an exhibition.

=== Training and Education ===
The training and further education is concentrated at the Berlin Fire and Rescue Service Academy, short BFRA. The main campus is located at Schulzendorfer Straße in the north-west of Berlin in the district of Berlin-Reinickendorf. Another training location is situated in an office complex in Berlin-Tegel. In particular, medical training and the training of station officers and incident commanders are carried out there.

There are advanced plans to relocate the Berlin Fire and Rescue Service Academy to the area of the former Berlin TXL-Airport.

== Structure ==
Berlin has a total of 36 professional fire stations, 59 volunteer fire stations and 47 youth fire stations. The urban parts of Berlin with a high population density are covered by professional fire stations, which are staffed 24/7. The firefighters work in a 12-hour shift system structured in four subdivisions. A few professional fire stations accommodate Type B volunteer fire brigades in the same building, who can provide support if necessary. In sparsely populated areas, Type A volunteer fire stations maintain their own buildings and deployment areas in which they have primary responsibility for operations Vehicles, technical equipment and protective clothing of the volunteer fire stations correspond to those of the professional fire brigade.

=== Fire Stations ===
| Fire Station | Station Number | Administration | Manning Level (Day/Night) | Address |
|---|---|---|---|---|
| Feuerwache Buckow | 5200 | Süd (Engl. South) | 11 / 9 | Johannisthaler Chaussee 222 12351 Berlin |
| Feuerwache Charlottenburg-Nord | 3600 | West | 15 / 13 | Nikolaus-Groß-Weg 2 13627 Berlin |
| Feuerwache Friedrichshain | 1200 | Süd | 12 / 10 | Rüdersdorfer Str. 56 10243 Berlin |
| Feuerwache Hellersdorf | 6200 | Nord (Engl. North) | 11 / 9 | Kummerower Ring 80 12621 Berlin |
| Feuerwache Hermsdorf | 2300 | Nord | 10 / 10 | Heinsestr. 24 13467 Berlin |
| Feuerwache Karlshorst | 6500 | Nord | 10 / 8 | Dönhoffstraße 31 10318 Berlin |
| Feuerwache Köpenick | 5400 | Süd | 17 / 17 | Grünauer Str. 140 12557 Berlin |
| Feuerwache Kreuzberg | 1600 | Süd | 10 / 10 | Wiener Str. 64 10999 Berlin |
| Feuerwache Lichtenberg | 6400 | Nord | 11 / 9 | Josef-Orlopp-Straße 69 10365 Berlin |
| Feuerwache Lichterfelde | 4600 | West | 10 / 10 | Goethestr. 7 12207 Berlin |
| Feuerwache Marienfelde | 4700 | Süd | 12 / 10 | Wilhelm-von-Siemens-Str. 15 12277 Berlin |
| Feuerwache Marzahn | 6100 | Nord | 21 / 19 | Märkische Allee 181 12681 Berlin |
| Feuerwache Moabit | 1400 | West | 10 / 10 | Jagowstr. 31–34 10555 Berlin |
| Feuerwache Neukölln | 5100 | Süd | 17 / 17 | Kirchhofstr. 20 12051 Berlin |
| Feuerwache Pankow | 2600 | Nord | 18 / 16 | Pasewalker Str. 120 13127 Berlin |
| Feuerwache Prenzlauer Berg | 1300 | Nord | 18 / 16 | Oderberger Str. 24 10435 Berlin |
| Feuerwache Ranke | 3500 | West | 12 / 12 | Rankestr. 10 10789 Berlin |
| Feuerwache Schillerpark | 2100 | West | 17 / 15 | Edinburgerstr. 7 13349 Berlin |
| Feuerwache Schöneberg | 4400 | Süd | 11 / 9 | Feurigstr. 58 10827 Berlin |
| Feuerwache Spandau-Nord | 3100 | West | 18 / 18 | Triftstr. 8–9 13585 Berlin |
| Feuerwache Spandau-Süd | 3200 | West | 21 / 19 | Betckestr. 13 13595 Berlin |
| Feuerwache Steglitz | 4200 | West | 10 / 10 | Südendstr. 18 A 12169 Berlin |
| Feuerwache Suarez | 3300 | West | 12 / 10 | Suarezstr. 9 14057 Berlin |
| Feuerwache Tegel | 2400 | Nord | 11 / 9 | Berliner Str. 16 13507 Berlin |
| Feuerwache Tempelhof | 4300 | Süd | 18 / 16 | Borussiastr. 16–17 12103 Berlin |
| Feuerwache Tiergarten | 1700 | West | 10 / 10 | Elisabeth-Abegg-Str. 2 10557 Berlin |
| Feuerwache Treptow | 5300 | Süd | 22 / 22 | Groß-Berliner Damm 18 12487 Berlin |
| Feuerwache Urban | 1500 | Süd | 14 / 14 | Wilmsstr. 19 10961 Berlin |
| Feuerwache Wannsee | 4500 | West | 10 / 8 | Kronprinzessinnenweg 20 14109 Berlin |
| Feuerwache Wedding | 2500 | West | 10 / 10 | Reinickendorfer Str. 15 a 13347 Berlin |
| Feuerwache Weißensee | 6300 | Nord | 20 / 20 | Parkstraße 38–39 13086 Berlin |
| Feuerwache Wilmersdorf | 3400 | West | 10 / 8 | Gasteiner Str. 19–20 10717 Berlin |
| Feuerwache Wittenau | 2200 | Nord | 13 / 13 | Roedernallee 55 13437 Berlin |
| Feuerwache Zehlendorf | 4100 | West | 19 / 19 | Charlottenburger Str. 10–12 14169 Berlin |
| Lehrrettungswache Mitte | 1100 | West | 20 / 18 | Voltairestraße 2 10179 Berlin |
| Technischer Dienst II | 6139 | | 11 / 11 | Märkische Allee 181 12681 Berlin |
| Technischer Dienst I | 3639 | | 21 / 21 | Nikolaus-Groß-Weg 2 13627 Berlin |
| Fernmeldeeinsatzdienst | 3649 | | 6 / 6 | Nikolaus-Groß-Weg 2 13627 Berlin |

=== Volunteer Fire Stations ===
| Fire Station | Station Type | Station Number | Administration | Address |
|---|---|---|---|---|
| Freiwillige Feuerwehr Mitte | B | 1110 | West | Linienstraße 128 – 129 10115 Berlin |
| Freiwillige Feuerwehr Friedrichshain | B | 1201 | Süd | Rüdersdorfer Straße 57 10243 Berlin |
| Freiwillige Feuerwehr Adlershof | A | 5310 | Süd | Selchowstr. 3–4 12489 Berlin |
| Freiwillige Feuerwehr Altglienicke | A+B | 5330 | Süd | Semmelweisstraße 87 12524 Berlin |
| Freiwillige Feuerwehr Biesdorf | B | 6120 | Nord | Alt-Biesdorf 58 12683 Berlin |
| Freiwillige Feuerwehr Blankenburg | A | 6360 | Nord | Alt-Blankenburg 9 13129 Berlin |
| Freiwillige Feuerwehr Blankenfelde | A | 2630 | Nord | Hauptstr. 14 13159 Berlin |
| Freiwillige Feuerwehr Bohnsdorf | A | 5320 | Süd | Waltersdorfer Str. 107 12526 Berlin |
| Freiwillige Feuerwehr Buch | A | 2710 | Nord | Pölnitzweg 3 13125 Berlin |
| Freiwillige Feuerwehr Buchholz | A | 2620 | Nord | Gravensteinstr. 10 13127 Berlin |
| Freiwillige Feuerwehr Charlottenburg-Nord | B | 3601 | West | Paulsternstr. 34 13629 Berlin |
| Freiwillige Feuerwehr Falkenberg | B | 6320 | Nord | Hausvaterweg 16 13057 Berlin |
| Freiwillige Feuerwehr Friedrichshagen | A | 5410 | Süd | Müggelseedamm 178 12587 Berlin |
| Freiwillige Feuerwehr Frohnau | A | 2320 | Nord | Remstaler Str. 9 13465 Berlin |
| Freiwillige Feuerwehr Gatow | A | 3210 | West | Gatower Str. 333 14089 Berlin |
| Freiwillige Feuerwehr Grünau | A | 5470 | Süd | Schlierseestr. 10 12527 Berlin |
| Freiwillige Feuerwehr Heiligensee | A | 2410 | Nord | Alt-Heiligensee 68 13503 Berlin |
| Freiwillige Feuerwehr Heinersdorf | A | 6370 | Nord | Romain-Rolland-Str. 105–107 13089 Berlin |
| Freiwillige Feuerwehr Hellersdorf | A | 6230 | Nord | Hellersdorfer Straße 147 12619 Berlin |
| Freiwillige Feuerwehr Hermsdorf | B | 2301 | Nord | Heinsestr. 24 13467 Berlin |
| Freiwillige Feuerwehr Hohenschönhausen | A | 6310 | Nord | Ferdinand-Schultze-Str. 128 13055 Berlin |
| Freiwillige Feuerwehr Karlshorst | A | 6501 | Nord | Dönhoffstraße 31 10318 Berlin |
| Freiwillige Feuerwehr Karow | A | 2720 | Nord | Alt-Karow 10/11 13125 Berlin |
| Freiwillige Feuerwehr Kaulsdorf | A | 6210 | Nord | Mädewalder Weg 21 12621 Berlin |
| Freiwillige Feuerwehr Kladow | A | 3220 | West | Kladower Damm 367 14089 Berlin |
| Freiwillige Feuerwehr Köpenick | B | 5401 | Süd | Grünauer Str. 140 12557 Berlin |
| Freiwillige Feuerwehr Kreuzberg | B | 1601 | Süd | Wiener Straße 64 10999 Berlin |
| Freiwillige Feuerwehr Lichtenberg | B | 6401 | Nord | Josef-Orlopp-Straße 69 10365 Berlin |
| Freiwillige Feuerwehr Lichtenrade | A | 4710 | Süd | Im Domstift 22 12309 Berlin |
| Freiwillige Feuerwehr Lichterfelde | B | 4601 | West | Goethestraße 7 12207 Berlin |
| Freiwillige Feuerwehr Mahlsdorf | A | 6220 | Nord | Donizettistr. 4 12623 Berlin |
| Freiwillige Feuerwehr Marienfelde | B | 4701 | Süd | Wilhelm-von-Siemens-Str. 15 12277 Berlin |
| Freiwillige Feuerwehr Marzahn | B | 6110 | Nord | Blenheimstr. 67 12685 Berlin |
| Freiwillige Feuerwehr Moabit | B | 1401 | West | Jagowstr. 31–34 10555 Berlin |
| Freiwillige Feuerwehr Müggelheim | A | 5440 | Süd | Krampenburger Weg 1 12559 Berlin |
| Freiwillige Feuerwehr Neukölln | B | 5101 | Süd | Kirchhofstr. 20 12051 Berlin |
| Freiwillige Feuerwehr Niederschönhausen | A | 2610 | Nord | Blankenburger Str. 19 13156 Berlin |
| Freiwillige Feuerwehr Oberschöneweide | A | 5340 | Süd | Siemensstr. 22 12459 Berlin |
| Freiwillige Feuerwehr Pankow | A | 2650 | Nord | Stiftsweg 1 a 13187 Berlin |
| Freiwillige Feuerwehr Prenzlauer Berg | B | 1310 | Nord | Schieritzstraße 24 10409 Berlin |
| Freiwillige Feuerwehr Rauchfangswerder | A | 5460 | Süd | Schmöckwitzer Damm 60 12527 Berlin |
| Freiwillige Feuerwehr Rudow | A | 5210 | Süd | Alt-Rudow 67 12355 Berlin |
| Freiwillige Feuerwehr Schmöckwitz | A | 5450 | Süd | Adlergestell 786 12527 Berlin |
| Freiwillige Feuerwehr Schöneberg | B | 4401 | Süd | Feurigstr. 58 10827 Berlin |
| Freiwillige Feuerwehr Spandau-Nord | B | 3101 | West | Triftstr. 8–9 13585 Berlin |
| Freiwillige Feuerwehr Staaken | A | 3110 | West | Hackbuschstr. 65 13591 Berlin |
| Freiwillige Feuerwehr Suarez | B | 3301 | West | Suarezstr. 9 14057 Berlin |
| Freiwillige Feuerwehr Tegel | B | 2401 | Nord | Berliner Str. 16 13507 Berlin |
| Freiwillige Feuerwehr Tegelort | A | 2420 | Nord | Friederikestr. 19 13505 Berlin |
| Freiwillige Feuerwehr Treptow | B | 5301 | Süd | Groß-Berliner Damm 18 12487 Berlin |
| Freiwillige Feuerwehr Urban | B | 1501 | Süd | Wilmsstr. 19 10961 Berlin |
| Freiwillige Feuerwehr Wartenberg-Malchow | A+B | 6330 | Nord | Dorfstraße 4 13059 Berlin |
| Freiwillige Feuerwehr Wedding | B | 2501 | West | Reinickendorfer Str. 15 a 13347 Berlin |
| Freiwillige Feuerwehr Weißensee | B | 6301 | Nord | Parkstraße 38–39 13086 Berlin |
| Freiwillige Feuerwehr Wilhelmshagen | A | 5430 | Süd | Frankenbergstraße 23 12589 Berlin |
| Freiwillige Feuerwehr Wilhelmsruh | A | 2640 | Nord | Edelweißstr. 35 13158 Berlin |
| Freiwillige Feuerwehr Wittenau | B | 2201 | Nord | Roedernallee 55 13437 Berlin |
| Freiwillige Feuerwehr Zehlendorf | B | 4101 | West | Charlottenburger Str. 10–12 14169 Berlin |

== Equipment and Vehicles ==
The Berlin Fire Brigade has a total of 920 vehicles. These include 194 fire engines (LHF Fire Extinguishing and Assistance Vehicle / LF Firefighting Apparatus), 42 turntable ladders (DLK Extendable Ladder Carrier), 232 ambulances (RTW Rescue Transport Wagon) and other medical service vehicles, 42 roll-off containers (AB), 82 trailers, a fire boat and five multi-purpose boats with water cannons. In addition to the different types of turntable ladders, the Berlin Fire Brigade also has a telescopic mast vehicle (TM 50). The TM 50 fire brigade telescopic mast from Metz Aerials / Waggonbau Görlitz on a MAN TGA chassis is used for rescuing people and fighting fires at heights. The working height is 50 meters (150 feet) . Special tank fire engines (TLF 24/40 Tanker Fire Apparatus) were purchased to secure the 2.4 km long Tiergarten Spreebogen tunnel (TTS) and the city highway. All seats inside the cabin are equipped with self-contained breathing apparatus. The TLF 24/40 has a supply of 4,000 liters of water and 400 liters of foam concentrate. The vehicle is also used in forest fires. Since July 30, 2020, the Berlin Fire Brigade has been testing four emergency drones equipped with thermal imaging cameras to detect sources of fire and embers.

=== Berlin Concept "LHF": Fire Engine with comprehensive technical equipment ===
The LHF (fire and rescue vehicle, German: Lösch- und Hilfeleistungsfahrzeug, Fire Extinguishing and Assistance Vehicle) is a special vehicle concept of the Berlin Fire Brigade. The vehicles can be used for firefighting as well as for various technical assistance (e.g. car accident, train accident, door opening, cutting, sealing). Their loading is very similar to that of "HLF - Fire Emergency Team Vehicle", which are used very frequently in Germany. However, LHF in Berlin are shorter and therefore more agile in narrow streets.

==== LHF 16/16 ====
The first LHF was put into service with the fire brigade in early 1983. Compared to the extinguishing group vehicles and tank fire engines that were common at the time, the LHF is more extensively equipped with devices for technical assistance. The LHF rescue pumper is an all-round vehicle for firefighting and technical rescue. The LHF 16/16 has a fire pump with a capacity of 1,600 L / min at 8 bar, a water tank with 1,600 L and a permanently installed foam agent tank with 400 L foam concentrate. For technical assistance, the vehicle is equipped with a hydraulic rescue kit consisting of rescue scissors, spreader and a rescue ram with an additional hand pump.

==== LHF 16/12 City ====
The LHF 16/12 City (short: City) has been used by the Berlin Fire Brigade since 1994. Compared to its predecessor, it has shrunk by 2.2 m in length and 20 cm in width, which means better maneuverability in road traffic. The LHF 16/12 also has a fire pump with an output of 1,600 L / min at 8 bar. The water container now only contains 1,200 L of water, the permanently installed foam agent container still contains 100 L of foam concentrate. For technical assistance, the vehicle, like its predecessor, is equipped with a portable generator and rescue kits. The LHF 16/12 is also available with all-wheel drive.

==== LHF 20/12 CAFS ====
A new generation of LHF has been in use since the beginning of 2007, which is equipped with compressed air foam systems (CAFS, German: Druckluftschaum). The LHF 20/12 has a fire pump with an output of 2,000 L / min at 10 bar, 1,200 L of water, 100 L of foam concentrate and a DLS system (CAFS 1,000 or 1,200). The vehicle is equipped with a hydraulic rescue kit for technical assistance, automatic transmission and a reversing camera. The fleet of the Berlin Fire Brigade has been renewed since 2018. In August 2019, the fire brigade received twelve new LHF 20/12 AT (lit. 'Advanced Technology'). By 2021, seventy more LHF 20/12 AT models are to be delivered.

==== LHF 20/8 ====
The LHF 20/8 was only procured for the volunteer fire departments and not for the professional fire brigade. The LHF 20/8 is based on a Mercedes-Benz Atego with all-wheel drive and has an 800-liter water tank (a 1,000 liter water tank is installed). The pumps deliver 2,000 liters / min at 10 bar. The vehicle body was developed by Rosenbauer.

==== LHF 10/5 ====
In 2011, two LHF 10/5 could be procured to replace the old LHF-K. The vehicles are the smallest LHF in Berlin. Like the LHF 20/8, they were only procured for the volunteer fire departments because the space circumstances did not allow for a larger LHF. The light pumpers navigate bridges and fire stations that were too small. However, almost the same equipment is in the vehicles as in the larger fire engines. A Mercedes-Benz Vario 818D with a Rosenbauer body (Compactline) was selected as the chassis. The two LHF 10/5 are stationed in Rauchfangswerder and Wilhelmshagen. Their water capacity reaches 500 liters.

==== eLHF ====
In September 2020, the first fully electrical fire truck (eLHF) was put into service for testing by the Berlin fire brigade. It results from a project of the Program for Sustainable Development (BENE 1213-B4-N), which is co-financed by the European Fund for Regional Development. The trial run will last until 2022.

=== Ambulance ===
The Berlin Fire Defence is responsible for the city's Emergency Medical Service, the Rettungsdienst - Rescue Service. The vast majority of annual operations are medical rescue operations. At the Berlin Fire Brigade, mainly Mercedes-Benz Sprinter vehicles with box bodies are used as ambulances. This design, in which the case can be detached from the chassis, enables a separate exchange of body or chassis after an accident or in the event of a technical defect. There is also an "Ambulance I" (intensive) for patients with highly contagious diseases, the Ambulance S (S = German shortcut: schwer; translation English: heavy) for the transport of overweight emergency patients and the Stroke Emergency Vehicle (STEMO) for stroke patients. As soon as 90% of the ambulances in Berlin are in use at the same time, the fire brigade control center calls out a kind of "state of emergency" and dispatches firefighters from fire engines to ambulances. In 2018, this happened 41 times, which resulted in delayed arrival times.

== City partnership ==
In addition to the transatlantic sister city agreement between Los Angeles and Berlin there are also strong relations on the fire department level. The Los Angeles Fire Department (LAFD) and the Berliner Feuerwehr maintain a close partnership with constant visits.

== See also ==
- German fire services
