= Karlslust =

The German name Karlslust (meaning "Charles' pleasure") can refer to the following:

- Karlslust Palace, in Waldviertel, Lower Austria
- a dance hall in Berlin, which burned on 8 February 1947, killing at least 80 people
- a locality of Storkow, Brandenburg
- a mansion located in the parks of Karlsberg Castle, Saarland
