= Karlslust dance hall fire =

1947 fire in Berlin, Germany

- Date: 8 February 1947
- Time: 10:45 pm
- Location: Berlin, Allied-occupied Germany; 52°34′1.6″N 13°11′50.42″E
- Also known as: Loebel's Restaurant fire
- Deaths: 81
- Injuries: 150

The Karlslust dance hall fire (also known as Loebel's Restaurant fire) occurred on 8 February 1947 in Hakenfelde, a locality of Spandau in what was then the British sector of Berlin. With its death toll of 80 to 88, it marks possibly the worst fire disaster in Germany since the Second World War. The death toll is today considered to be 81: 80 guests and the owner of the restaurant, Julius Loebel, who died while attempting to save a cashbox.

== The fire ==
The Karlslust was the largest restaurant and dance hall in Spandau during the first half of the 20th century, a two storied building with ballroom and bowling alley famous for its "legendary" parties. On the evening of Saturday, 8 February 1947, during carnival time in Germany, the first postwar fancy-dress ball was scheduled. The landlord, Julius Loebel, had been granted the concession of a lifted curfew that night, as Berlin was occupied at that time. An estimated 750 to 800 (or even up to 1,000) mostly young people attended the event, among them a number of British Army staff.

Because of extremely low outside temperatures of −20 °C (−4 °F) or −25 °C (−13 °F), (Note: The winter of 1946/47 was one of the coldest ever observed in Europe.) three potbelly stoves had been set up inside the Karlslust to provide heating. At around 22:45, when the party was in full swing, the wooden overhead beams of the structure caught on fire, likely, as was later determined, as a result of the intense heat of the stove pipes. The Karlslust had been used as a prison in the last months of the war in Germany, and windows had been barred and doors walled up; additionally, a side door was frozen shut. In the ensuing stampede for the only exit, several people were trampled to death. After three minutes, the entire roof of the building was on fire.

Realizing the extent of the fire, several of those who had already escaped returned to retrieve their winter clothing from the cloakroom. This behaviour was later met with incredulity by the British authorities, but can be attributed to the tight supply situation in postwar Germany, where people were living on ration stamps. Eventually, the roof of the Karlslust collapsed, burying those still inside.

=== Fire response ===
Firefighters from the Berlin Fire Brigade and the British Army started arriving about ten minutes after the initial call. In an attempt to rescue those trapped inside the collapsed building, three or six British soldiers died. A few guests of the Karlslust survived the roof collapse and could be pulled out of the debris; they had found shelter in the cellar.

Summoning firefighters was difficult at that time, as there was no standardized emergency telephone number, and each fire station had to be notified separately. The freezing temperatures and the snow-covered area hampered the firefighting efforts. The bulk of German firefighters did not arrive at Karlslust until forty minutes after having been called, for a variety of reasons: the low quality of their vehicles, whose engines needed some time to warm up; the speed limit of 40 km/h (25 mph) for civilians in Berlin, which had been imposed to ensure priority rights for Allied military vehicles; and with bridges over the Havel river having been destroyed during the war, detours were required to get to Hakenfelde from places in Spandau as well as the rest of Berlin.

=== Fatalities ===
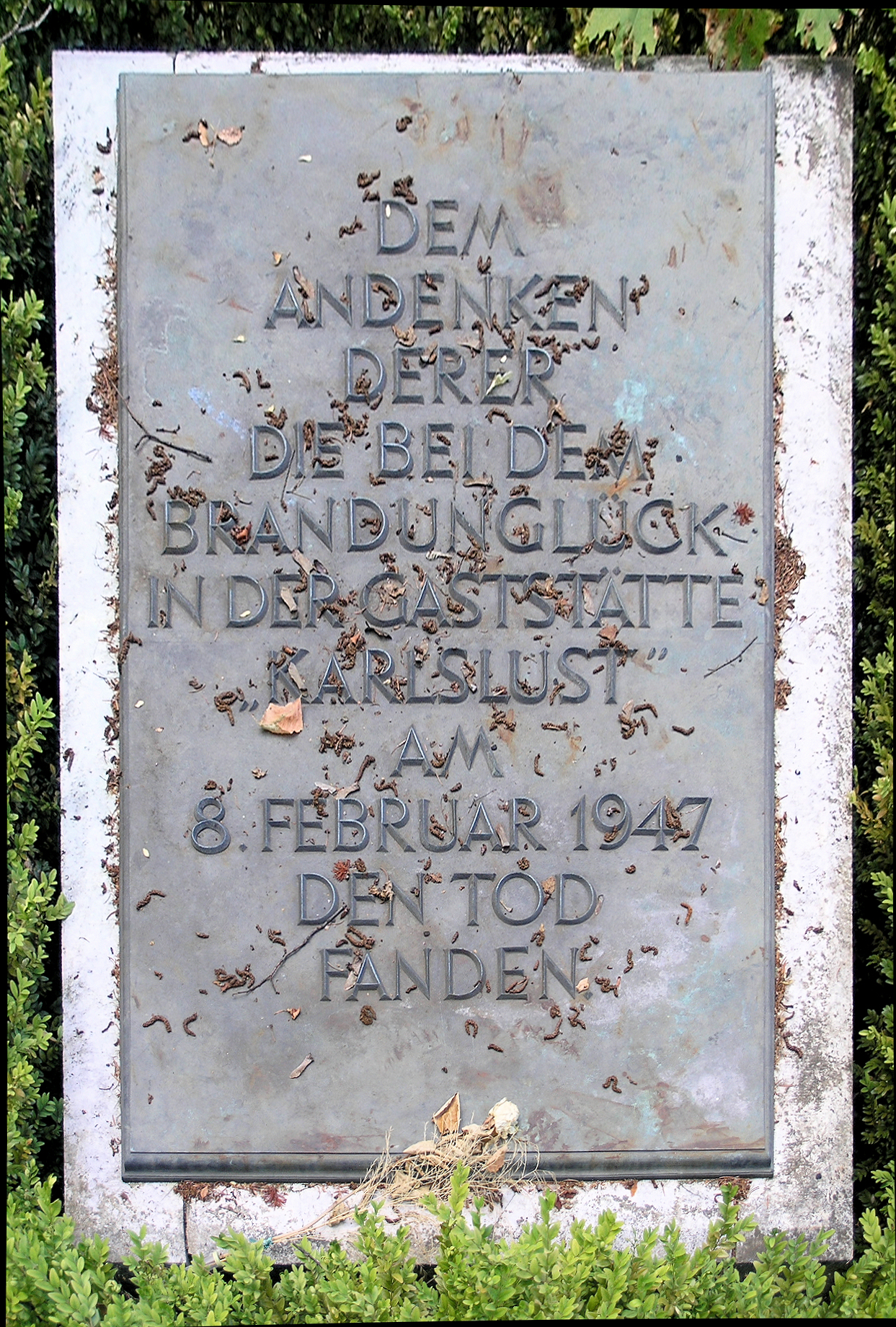
A memorial stone in den Kisseln cemetery. The German inscription reads: "In memory of those who perished in the fire disaster at the Karlslust inn on 8 February 1947".

In the immediate aftermath of the fire, Der Spiegel reported that 88 bodies had been found, many of them burned beyond recognition, and that another 108 people were missing. 150 people were injured, 40 of which needed hospital treatment.

Later sources put the death toll to 80, 81, or 82. On 25 February 1947, 77 victims were buried at In den Kisseln cemetery, at a dedicated spot called "Loebel field", named after the landlord of the ill-fated dance hall. Until that day, all festivities and dance events in Berlin were cancelled.

== Aftermath ==
The Magistrate of Berlin, the civilian government for the whole city between 1945 and 1948, ordered the delivery of cloth for 800 winter cloaks; lost ration stamps were replaced. Political parties that collected donations for the victims included the Christian Democratic Union, the Social Democratic Party and the Socialist Unity Party alike.

In order to address issues identified as having slowed down the emergency response to the fire, both the speed limit for civilian vehicles and the general traffic priority for Allied vehicles was lifted on 13 March 1947. A standardized, general emergency telephone number for Berlin was reinstated on 20 October of that year, using the number "02".

Today, a high-rise building occupies the space where the Karlslust was located, at 8 Hakenfelder Straße.
