= Bundeswehr-Feuerwehr =

Fire fighting institution

Bundeswehrfeuerwehr Bundeswehr fire department
- (BWFw)
- ]

Operational area
- Country: Germany

Agency overview
- Established: 1958
- Employees: 3050
- Staffing: Civil and armed soldiers

Facilities and equipment
- Stations: 68
- Engines: more than 500

The Bundeswehrfeuerwehr is a fire fighting department of Bundeswehr, the armed forces of Germany. With over 3,000 employees, it is the second largest professional fire department in Germany.

== History and area of responsibility ==
The German armed forces are responsible for firefighting on their property. Usually this task is delegated to the local fire brigades. On some military realties though, Bundeswehr maintains its own fire fighting service.

The Bundeswehrfeuerwehr is deployed to objects with an increased potential of danger, such as underground facilities, airbases, naval bases, military training grounds, ammunition depots or technical centres. Military camps for missions abroad maintain firefighting personnel that consists of regular troops, e.g. firefighters from special engineer battalions of the Joint Support Service or of the German Air Force Regiment.

The first trucks for fire brigards were deployed in 1958, three years after the foundation of Bundeswehr.

== Tasks ==
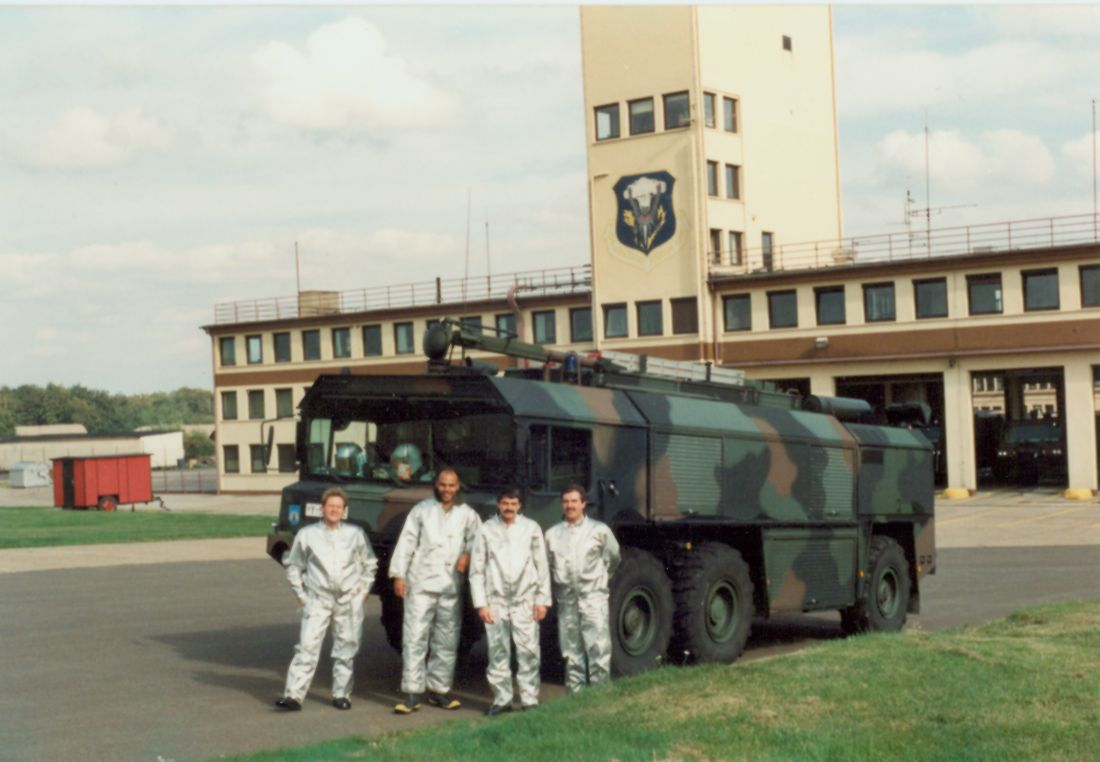
TLF 3500 fire engine of Bundeswehr-Feuerwehr at former Hahn Air Base in 1992

The primary task of the Bundeswehrfeuerwehr is to ensure the safety of Bundeswehr personnel and the operational readiness of the forces. The firefighters are in service with army, air force and naval units, they are deployed to armament facilities and basically to all objects that constitute a special fire or explosion hazard and that are vital for national defense.

The tasks of a Bundeswehr firefighter are very similar to those of a regular publicly employed firefighter. They will rescue persons from dangerous situations and will fight fires, e.g. vehicle or ammunition fires.

On naval grounds, firefighting duties must also be performed on ships, boats and at harbour facilities. Further tasks include technical support, emergency management, environmental protection and support of local fire brigades.

The Bundeswehr fire brigade is also deployed with the regular troops on the off-site. During the ISAF mission in Afghanistan, the Bundeswehr fire brigade was deployed to support the Afghan fire brigade. However, always with security by armed forces.

== Organisation ==
With over 3,000 employees, the Bundeswehr Fire Department is the second largest professional fire department in Germany - behind the Berlin Fire Department.

Education and training is executed at the central training center in Stetten am Kalten Markt, Baden-Württemberg and the fire protection center of the Bundeswehr in Sonthofen, Bavaria.

Most Bundeswehr firefighters are also soldiers. With the realignment of the Bundeswehr from 2012, civilian employees were also specifically hired. The career as a firefighter strats in the middle fire service. Positions as an official in the upper and higher fire service are also possible. A military career (non-commissioned officer, officer) is also possible as a firefighter in the Bundeswehr.

== Equipment ==
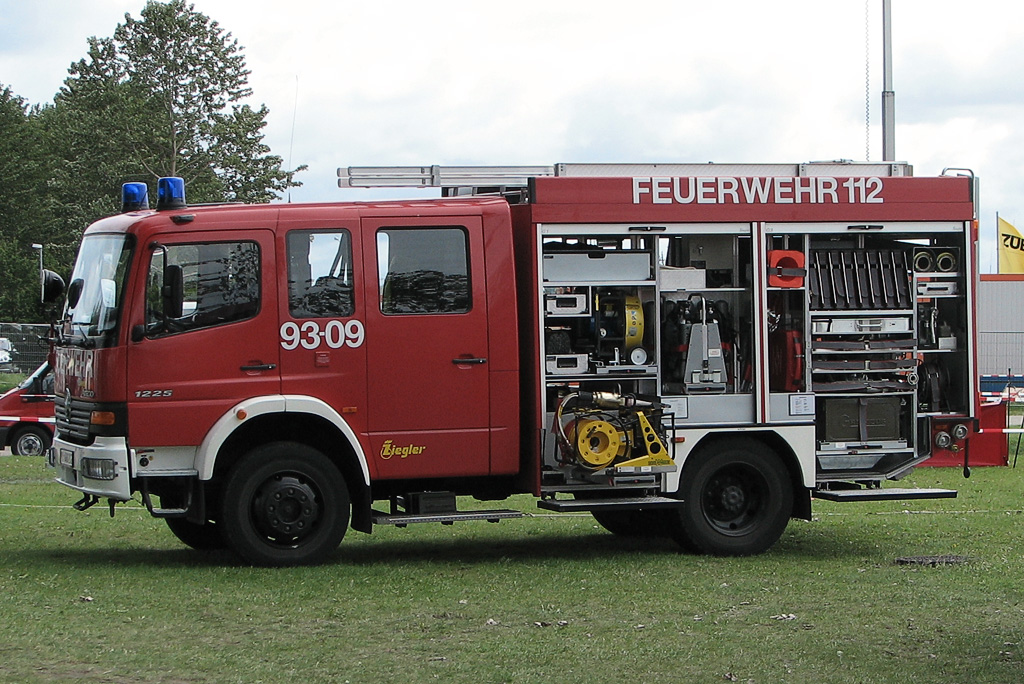
TLF 16/25 type tanker at Hohe Düne Naval Station

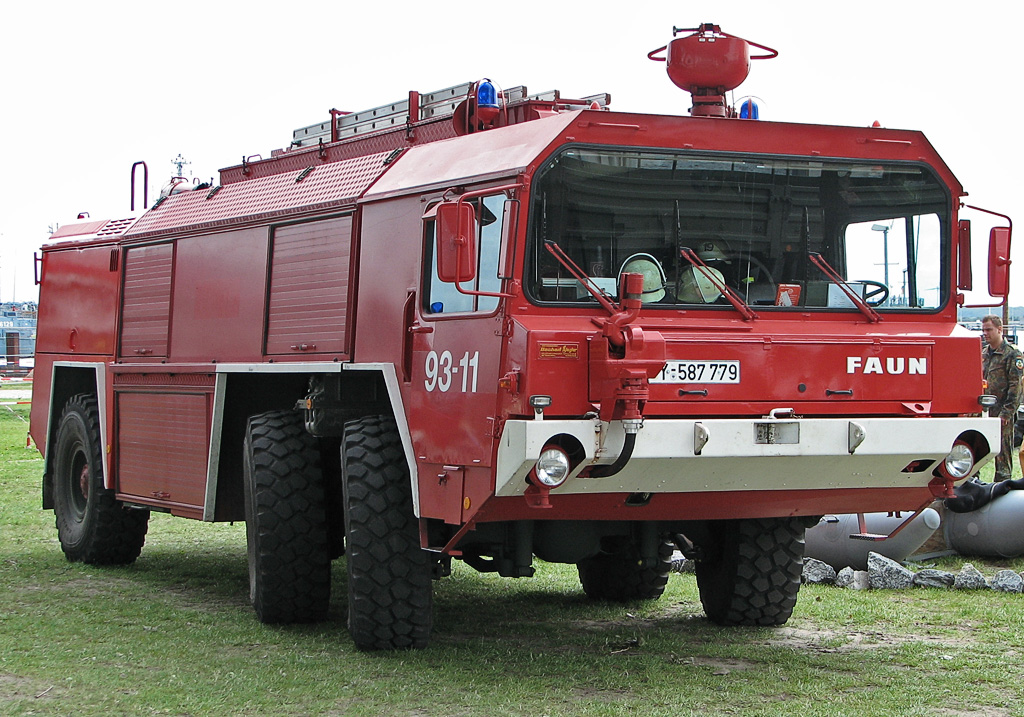
Large fire engine of the Bundeswehrfeuerwehr

The various types of fire engines usually have red livery (RAL 3000) since the late 1990s. Special vehicles include airport crash tenders, Brush Trucks and rescue trucks for the evacuation of pilots.

== See also ==
- German fire services
