= Walter Gempp =

German firefighting expert

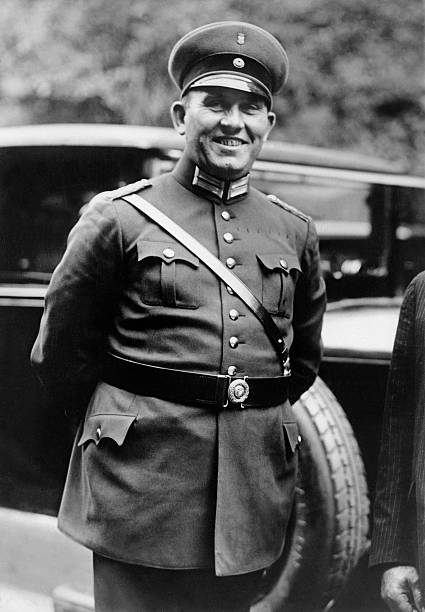
- Walter Gempp, c. 1928
- Born: September 13, 1878
- Died: May 2, 1939 (aged 60)

Walter Gempp (13 September 1878 – 2 May 1939) was a German engineer. From 1922 to 1933 he was the sixth head of the Berlin Fire Brigade.

After studying mechanical engineering, Gempp joined the Berlin Fire Department in 1908. He was given the project of developing a motorized fire extinguishing service, and in 1908 he produced the first engine-powered hose truck. In 1923 he became chief fire commissioner in Berlin.

Gempp was head of the Berlin fire department at the time of the Reichstag fire on 27 February 1933, personally directing the operations at the incident. On 25 March he was dismissed for presenting evidence that suggested Nazi involvement in the fire. Gempp asserted that there had been a delay in notifying the fire brigade and that he had been forbidden from making full use of the resources at his disposal.

In 1937, he was arrested for abuse of office. Despite his appeal, he was imprisoned. On 2 May 1939, Gempp was found dead in his cell. Some literature suggests that he was murdered by the National Socialists. Other authors state that Gempp took his own life in order to secure his family's pension entitlements, which would have been lost if the judgment against him had become final.
