= Werkfeuerwehr =

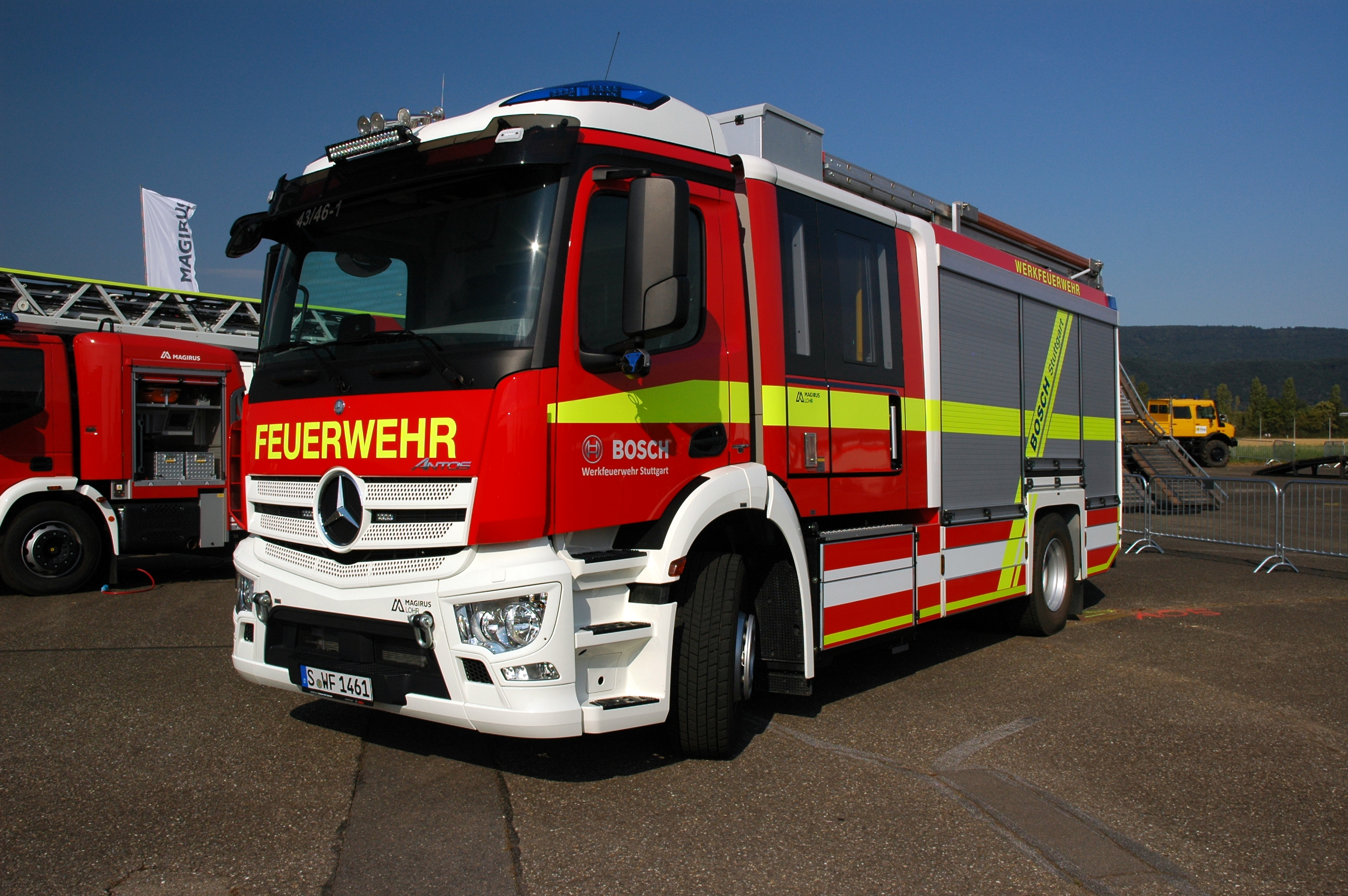
HLF 30 of the Bosch Stuttgart Werkfeuerwehr

A Werkfeuerwehr is an on-site fire brigade in Germany or Switzerland that is publicly accredited, but not considered a public fire department. Werkfeuerwehren are fire brigades either established or recognized by supervisory authorities.

== General information ==
The primary task of a Werkfeuerwehr is the fire protection of large industrial complexes. They must meet the standards of both the business, as well as of public fire brigades in terms of structure, training, and equipment.

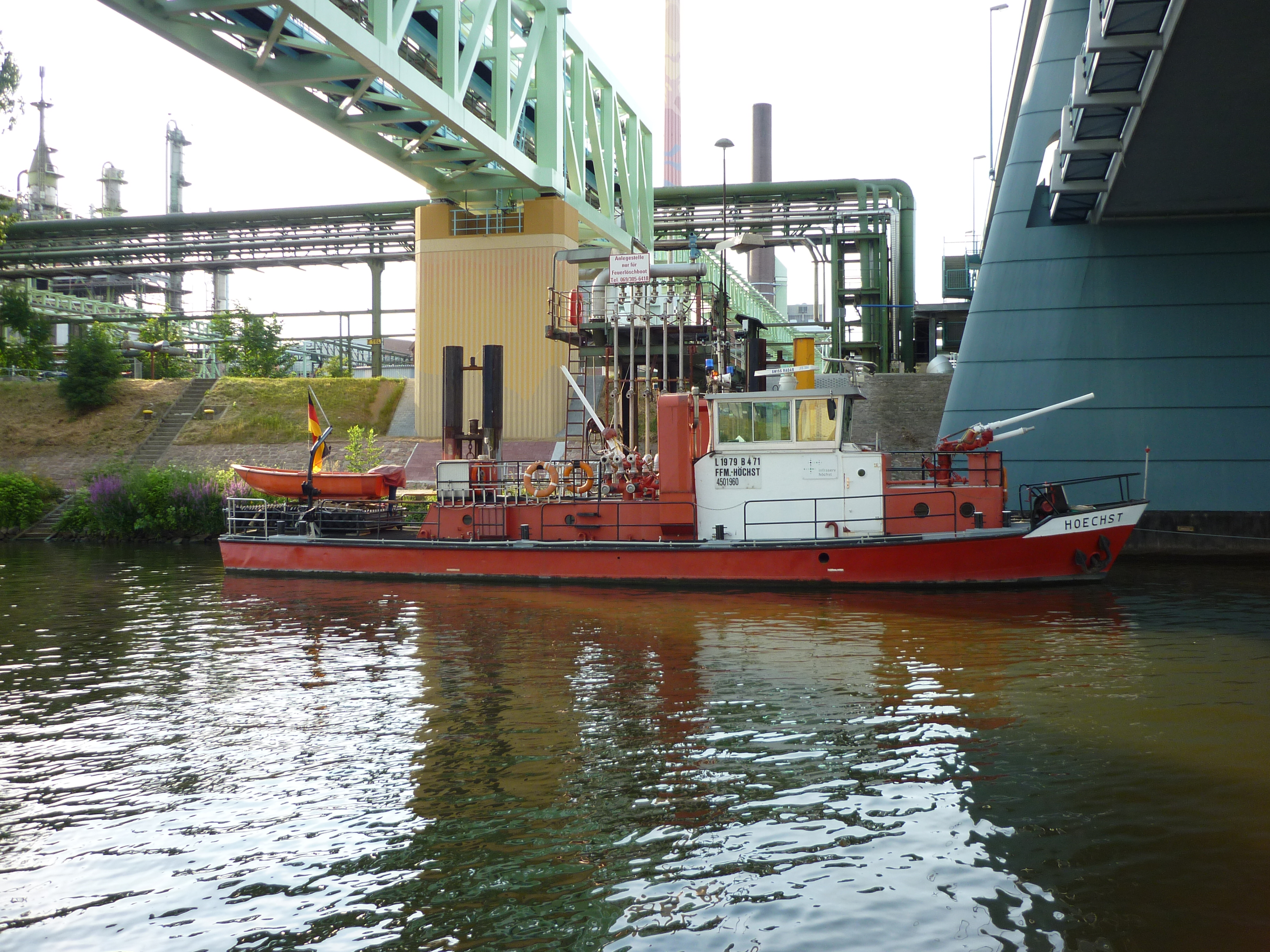
Fireboat of the Höchst Industrial Park fire brigade

A Werkfeuerwehr generally receives specialized training depending on the company. For example, airport fire departments are specially trained to fight fires on aircraft. A Werkfeuerwehr may also be deployed outside of company premises upon request.

Members of a Werkfeuerwehr can work both full-time and on-call/part-time. Part-time members often have a different task in the company, which they can leave in case of an emergency. A Werkfeuerwehr can be structured like a professional fire department or like a volunteer fire department. Unlike public fire departments, the number of firefighters is set not by law, but by collective agreement or by decision of the company.

=== Germany ===
In Germany, public fire departments (professional, compulsory, and volunteer) and the Werkfeuerwehren make up the municipal fire departments. The supervisory authorities, such as the district government in North Rhine-Westphalia, regularly review the performance of the Werkfeuerwehren in the district. In Baden-Württemberg, the Kreisfeuerwehrverband (district fire brigade association) is responsible for overseeing and certifying the Werkfeuerwehren in the district.

The establishment of a Werkfeuerwehr can be mandated by law due to a particular hazardous situation within a company, or they can be a voluntary action by a company desiring shorter response times compared to a public fire department, thus reducing operating costs by reducing machine downtime. Further reasons for the establishment of a Werkfeuerwehr are lower insurance premiums and the ability for improved fire compartmentation during emergencies.

In Germany, private fire departments that are not state-recognized are called Betriebsfeuerwehren.

Since August 1, 2009, a dual training program has existed in Germany, allowing people to train as members of both a Werkfeuerwehr and a public fire department.

=== Switzerland ===
In Switzerland, some Werkfeuerwehren are members of the Association of Swiss Professional Fire Brigades. The Industrial Fire Brigade of Regio Basel AG, Genève Service Sécurité Aéroport und die Werkfeuerwehr Roche, are all members.

== Examples ==
=== Germany ===
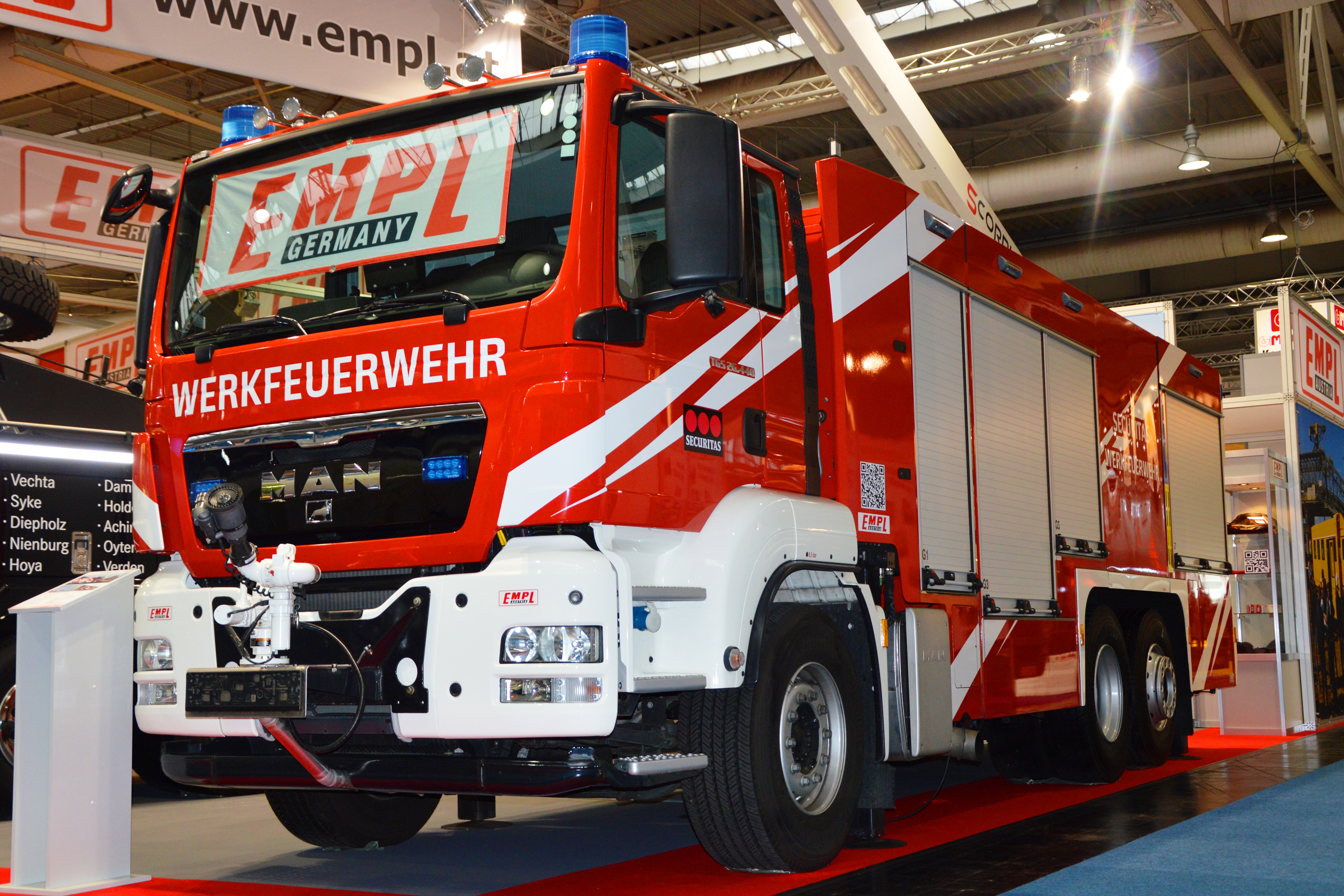
Fire engine of EMPL Fahrzeugwerk GmbH

There are over 750 Werkfeuerwehren in Germany. Among others are:

- Werkfeuerwehr BASF in Ludwigshafen am Rhein
- Werkfeuerwehr Bosch Stuttgart
- Flughafenfeuerwehr Düsseldorf
- Werkfeuerwehr Forschungszentrum Jülich
- Flughafenfeuerwehr Frankfurt am Main
- Werkfeuerwehr des Industrieparks Höchst in Frankfurt am Main
- Flughafenfeuerwehr München
- TUM Fire Department in Garching
- Flughafenfeuerwehr Nürnberg

=== Switzerland ===
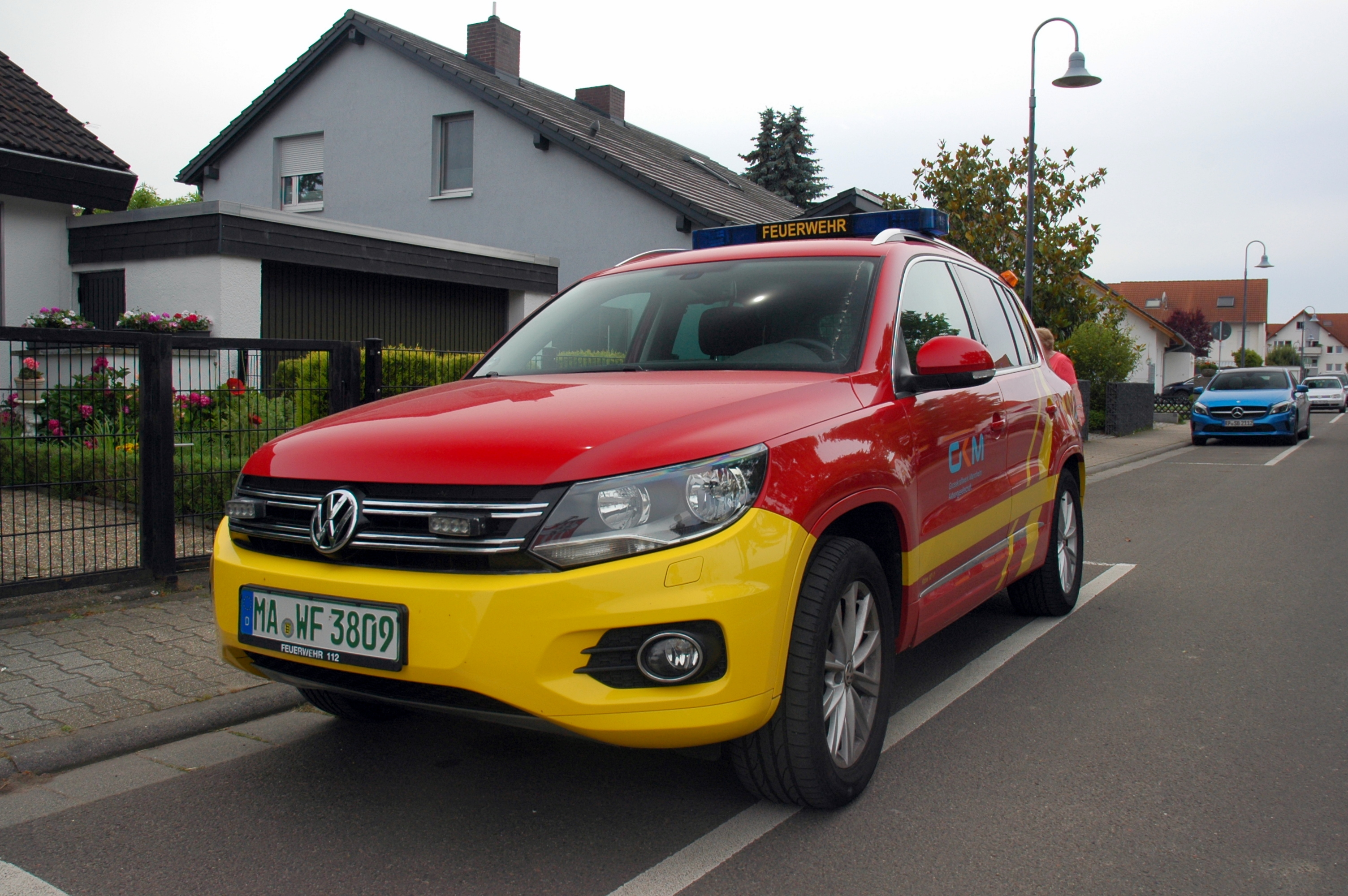
KdoW of the Mannheim Power Plant Fire Brigade

- Betriebswehr SBB Erstfeld
- Betriebswehr SBB Biasca
- Chemiewehr Uri
- Werkhoffeuerwehr Flüelen

== See also ==
- Airport fire department
