= German Fire Services =

German public institution

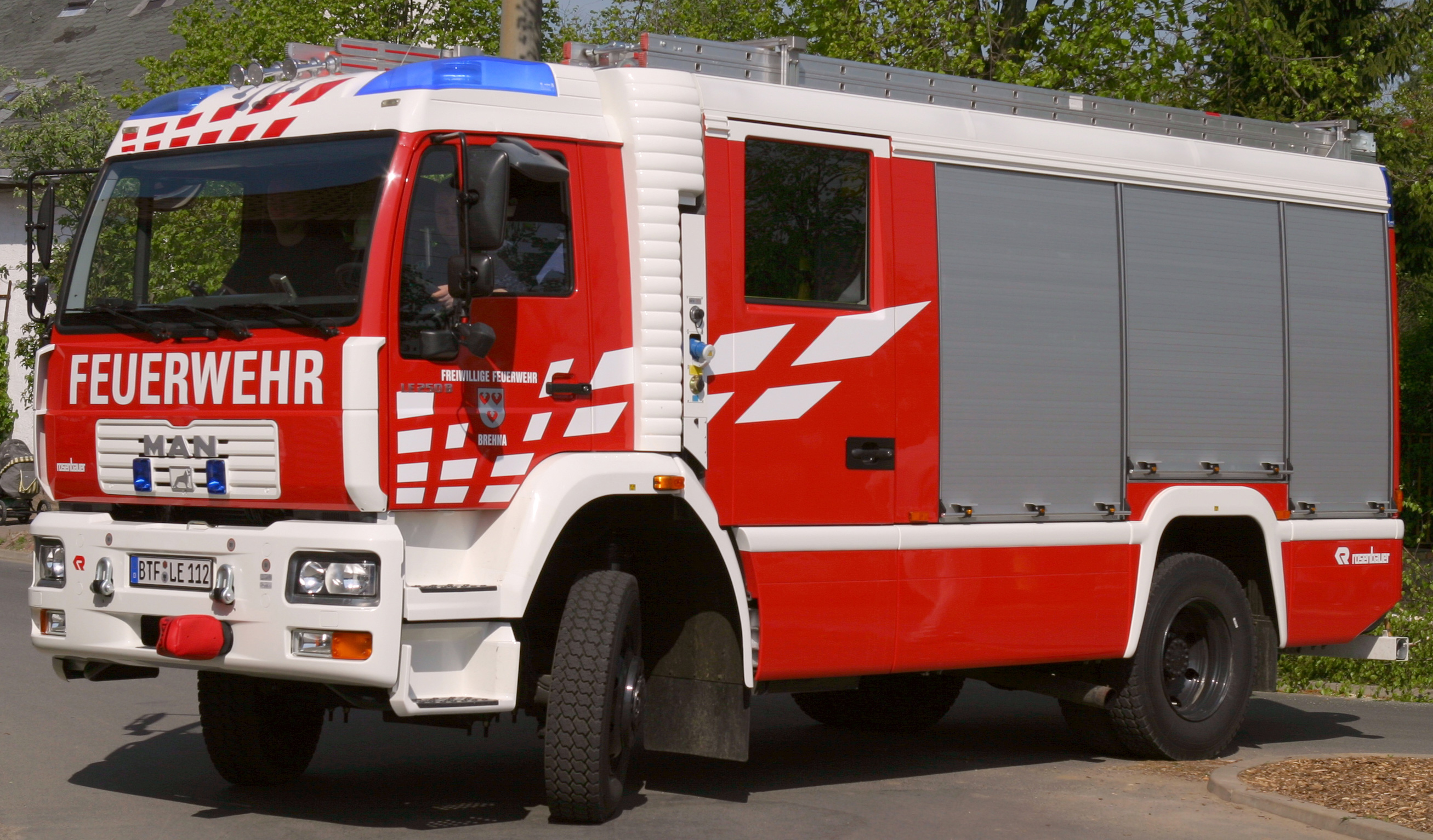
A MAN LF 16/12 (Engine) of the Volunteer Fire Station in Brehna, Germany

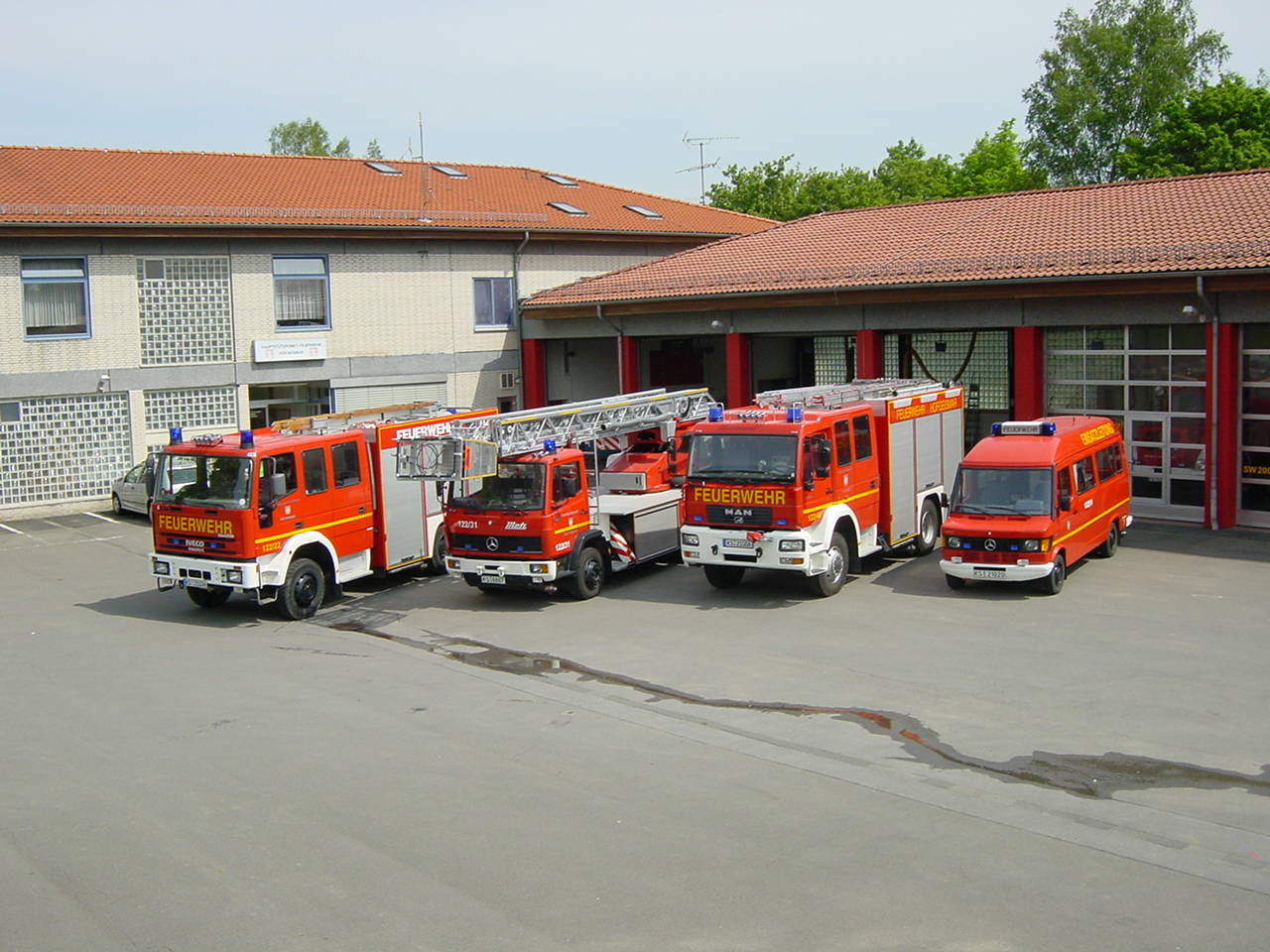
Fire platoon of one of the stations of the fire department of the city of Hofgeismar

The Feuerwehr (German for "fire service", lit. 'fire service') is the general term for German fire departments. Fire departements are operated and equipping by communities ("Gemeinden") and cities ("Städte") in Germany. By law, they are required to operate fire-fighting forces. In cities, this is usually performed by the Fire Prevention Bureau, one of the higher-ranking authorities.

There are three kinds of recruiting firefighters in Germany: the predominant number of Germany's 1,383,730 firefighters are members of voluntary fire brigades (Freiwillige Feuerwehr), a lesser number working in professional fire brigades and at least the drafted members of a Compulsory Fire Service (Pflichtfeuerwehr), established just in a few places nationwide.

Professional fire brigades are usually operated as

- Berufsfeuerwehr (professional fire station or brigade) of a municipal body counting over 100,000 citizens, such as the city of Berlin as a full-time city department
- Werkfeuerwehr (plant fire station or brigade) of a larger company, for the needs of the company operating them by law e.g. refineries or chemical industry production facilities
- Betriebsfeuerwehr (factory fire station or brigade) of a larger company, that does not need to run a Werkfeuerwehr by law, but if it is required for the insurance coverage
- Flughafenfeuerwehr (airport fire station or brigade) as airports have to meet the ICAO requirements, this includes airplane factories like that of Airbus in Hamburg
- Bundeswehr-Feuerwehr (armed forces fire station or brigade) with specialized divisions such as Fliegerhorstfeuerwehr Cologne-Wahn located at German air force bases, military bases, naval bases as well as on any ship of the German Navy

By law, cities with a population of more than 80,000–100,000 people (depending on the state) are required to have a professional fire-fighting force ("Berufsfeuerwehr"). Others such as smaller cities and towns can set up a full-time force ("Hauptamtliche Wachbereitschaft"), which is basically a group or a squadron occupying one large fire station around the clock. This force deals with smaller incidents on its own and is supported by voluntary forces for larger incidents. Each community meets the need of fire-fighting personnel by setting up a voluntary force ("Freiwillige Feuerwehr"). If it is not possible to recruit enough personnel for this job, the mayor of a city is required to set up a "Pflichtfeuerwehr" (compulsory fire brigade), where he will draft the number of personnel required.

== Organisation ==
=== Tactical units ===
==== Overview ====
Voluntary and professional fire brigades usually share the same basic layout when deploying. Firefighters are organized in tactical units as follows:

Unit	Translation	Number of personnel	Leader	Comments
Trupp	Troop (squad)	2 or 3 (as unit within other units)	squad leader	part of the crew of an engine
Selbstständiger Trupp	independent troop (squad)	3 (as own tactical unit, e.g. vehicle crew)	"squad leader" (needs to have the training of a group leader)	usually the crew of a ladder or other special vehicles
Staffel	squadron	2 squads + engine operator + squadron leader	squadron leader	most common unit of professional fire fighting forces; minimum standard for firefighting
Gruppe	group	3 squads + engine operator + message runner + group leader	group leader	most common unit of voluntary fire fighting forces; usually the crew of an engine; the term message runner was created before radio electronics came into use, today the message runner can also act as second engine operator, supports a squad or is in charge for security surveillance (e.g. traffic regulation)
Zug	platoon; Strike Team (description changes from place to place)	2 groups + platoon squad	platoon leader	usually consisting of several vehicles, e.g. 1 command car, an engine, a tanker and a ladder depending on the platoon type (e.g. "Löschzug" for fire, "Rüstzug" for technical rescue or "Gefahrgutzug" for hazmats)

In contrast to the United States system, there is no division into engine and ladder companies.

==== Organization of a Gruppe (group) or Staffel (squadron) ====
Most standard procedures in German firefighting are based on the Gruppe (group), since it is the smallest tactical unit to work independently. The also common Staffel (squadron) is basically a group stripped down to the absolutely necessary minimum, which can easily be extended to a Gruppe by joining with a three-firefighter Trupp (squad) from another vehicle. Due to the financial situation of most German cities, the squadron is the most common unit for professional fire-fighting forces, because it provides sufficient manpower but saves three firefighters in comparison to a group.

The standard procedures for fire and technical aid and rescue assign certain tasks to certain crew members. This helps keeping the orders the unit commander has to give short and simple, since those tasks don't need to be specifically assigned to anyone. However, most of these guidelines date back to a time when Self-contained breathing apparatus was not widespread. Thus, if SCBA is applied, the procedure has to be adapted.

Role	Translation	Tasks according to standard fire procedure	Tasks according to standard technical aid/rescue procedure	Comments
Einheitsführer	unit leader/ captain	commands the unit, is responsible for the crew's safety, determines placement of vehicle and, if necessary, of portable fire pump	commands the unit, is responsible for the crew's safety, determines placement of vehicle and, if necessary, of powered appliances like generators etc.	The more specific terms "Gruppenführer" (group leader) and "Staffelführer" (squadron leader) depending on the unit's size were abandoned
Maschinist	engine operator/ engineer Appliance Operator (UK)	drives the engine, operates the pump and other machinery, assists other crew members unloading equipment from the engine and building up water supply	drives the engine, operates powered appliances (e.g. generators, hydraulic pumps), assists other crew members unloading equipment from the engine	while driving, the engine operator is responsible for safety of crew and vehicle
Melder	message runner / Incident Commander's Aide	carries out assigned tasks (e.g. assists the unit commander, provides assistance to a squad deploying a ladder, takes care of casualties, relays information)	carries out assigned tasks (e.g. assists the unit commander, assists with deploying appliances, takes care of casualties, relays information)	In a staffel (squadron) this position is not occupied
Angriffstrupp	Engine Company	rescues (especially from areas only accessible with SCBA); deploys the Wye (between main water supply line and attack lines); usually deploys the first nozzle	rescues, provides first aid until ambulance arrives and EMTs take over, provides technical aid	
Wassertrupp	water squad	rescues; builds up water supply for the engine; deploys portable ladders on command; becomes rescue squad, if SCBAs are in use (Two-in, two-out)	secures the incident site against additional hazards using the necessary equipment, is free for other tasks after that	
Schlauchtrupp	hose squad	rescues; lays out attack lines for the other squads (due to SCBA and technical simplifications such as hose carrying baskets nowadays redundant; the squads lay out hoses on their own); if SCBA is applied immediately after arrival, the hose squad instead of the water squad has to build up the water supply; deploys portable ladders on command; takes additional tasks like operating the Wye or deploying additional appliances	prepares the equipment for the attack squad, if necessary assists the attack squad and operates needed powered appliances; if the attack squad is busy providing first aid, the hose squad takes over deploying the ordered appliances	in a Staffel (squadron) this squad is missing, so the remaining two squads have to take over its tasks.

== Personnel ==
The hierararchy of the professional fire departments and volunteer fire departments is corresponding to other German institutions e.g. the police.

=== Volunteer fire fighters ===
The volunteer firefighters ranks are as follows (with deviations depending on the federal state):

Firefighters

- Feuerwehrmannanwärter (FMA)/trainee fresh to the fire brigade, at least 18 years old (16 years in some German states).
- Feuerwehrmann (FM)/Firefighter after the first part of the basic training.
- Oberfeuerwehrmann (OFM) after the second part of the basic training and after at least two years as Feuerwehrmann (FM)
- Hauptfeuerwehrmann (HFM) after being Oberfeuerwehrmann (OFM) for five years.

Leaders

- Löschmeister (LM) after being Hauptfeuerwehrmann for ten years or/and qualification "group leader" (Gruppenführer).
- Oberlöschmeister (OLM) after being Löschmeister for ten years or/and qualification "platoon leader" (Zugführer).
- Unterbrandmeister (UBM)(does not exist in Baden-Wuerttemberg, in Bavaria it's called "Hauptlöschmeister", HLM) with completed training to leading a squad or platoon squad and at least one year being Oberfeuerwehrmann (OFM).
- Brandmeister (BM) after at least two years as Unterbrandmeister (UBM) and two weeks training at the county's fire school (F3). Allowed to command a squadron or group.
- Oberbrandmeister (OBM) at least two years as Brandmeister (BM)
- Hauptbrandmeister (HBM) at least five years as Oberbrandmeister (OBM)
- Brandinspektor (BI) after a training at the county's fire school (F4). Allowed to command a platoon. Must have been Oberbrandmeister (OBM) before.
- Brandoberinspektor (BOI) ( after a training at the countys fireschool (F/B5). Allowed to command several platoons. Must have been Brandinspektor (BI) before.
- Ranks differ between states because each state is responsible for providing and admitting its own fire services as Thuringia i.e. provides education and administration of all fire brigades in Thuringia and Saxony provides it for all brigades in Saxony and so on.

=== Employed fire fighters ===
In Germany there are three career groups for fire fighters. They are governed by state laws for civil servants.

==== Overview ====
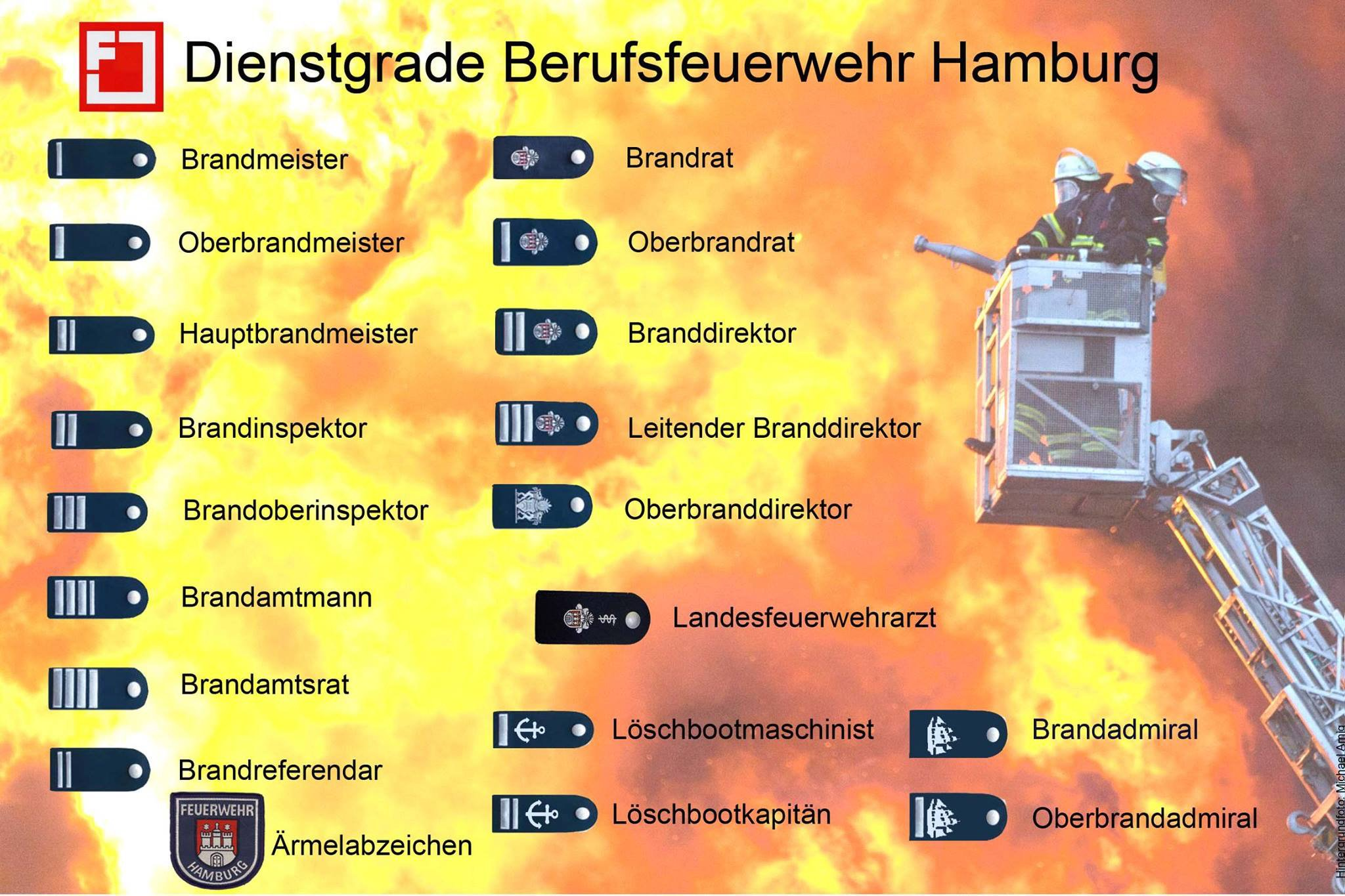
Rank insignia of the Professional Fire Department of Hamburg

Medium grades

- Brandmeister i.a. (in reversionary) in the most states this is the professional starting rank. This grade requires vocational training in a useful job (mostly craft or industrial)
- Brandmeister (in Baden-Wuerttemberg, this is the first grade) the same conditions as Brandmeister i.a.

The firefighters start with an 18-month training time which ends with test. The use of Brandmeister is dependent of the size of the fire department they are working for. In bigger departments mostly as water squad in smaller departments also as attack squad or engine operator.

- Oberbrandmeister used as water squad (leader) and attack squad, engine operator
- Hauptbrandmeister (in bigger fire departments attack squad leader in smaller also unit leader) ladder operator

Executive grades

- Brandinspektor i.A

Condition to start directly in this grade is a college degree, starting with a 24-month training and end a test.

- Brandinspektor used mostly as unit leader (engine)
- Brandoberinspektor Brandamtmann, Brandamtsrat and Brandoberamtsrat, used mostly as platoon leaders.

Senior civil service

- Brandreferendar z.a/-assessor, a master's degree is required to start directly in this grade.
- Brandrat, Oberbrandrat (some states: Brandoberrat), Branddirektor and Leitender Branddirektor. These grades are use in the functions of division chief/deputy/deputy assistant oder chief/commissioner assistant chief/commissioner, chief/commissioner dependent of the size of the city they are working for.

In cities with more than 400,000 people the top position of Direktor der Feuerwehr (NRW), Landesbranddirektor (Berlin), Oberbranddirektor (Hamburg, München), Direktor der Branddirektion (Hessen) or Stadtdirektor (Baden-Württemberg (Stuttgart)) exists.

==== Rank insignia in Rheinland-Pfalz ====
Medium grades

Brandmeister/-in während der Laufbahnausbildung	Brandmeister	Oberbrandmeister	Hauptbrandmeister
fire fighter under training

Executive grades

Brandinspektorenanwärter	Brandinspektor	Brandoberinspektor	Brandamtmann	Brandamtsrat	Brandoberamtsrat
executive grade under training

Senior civil service

Brandreferendar	Brandrat	Oberbrandrat	Branddirektor	Leitender Branddirektor; Ministerialrat	Leitender Ministerialrat	Landesfeuerwehrinspekteur
senior civil service trainee				assistant state fire chief	deputy state fire chief	state fire chief

== Vehicles ==
Technically, there are eleven common types of vehicles in service at German fire departements. However, due to regional needs and availability, there are a vast number of different vehicles in use.

The standardized types:

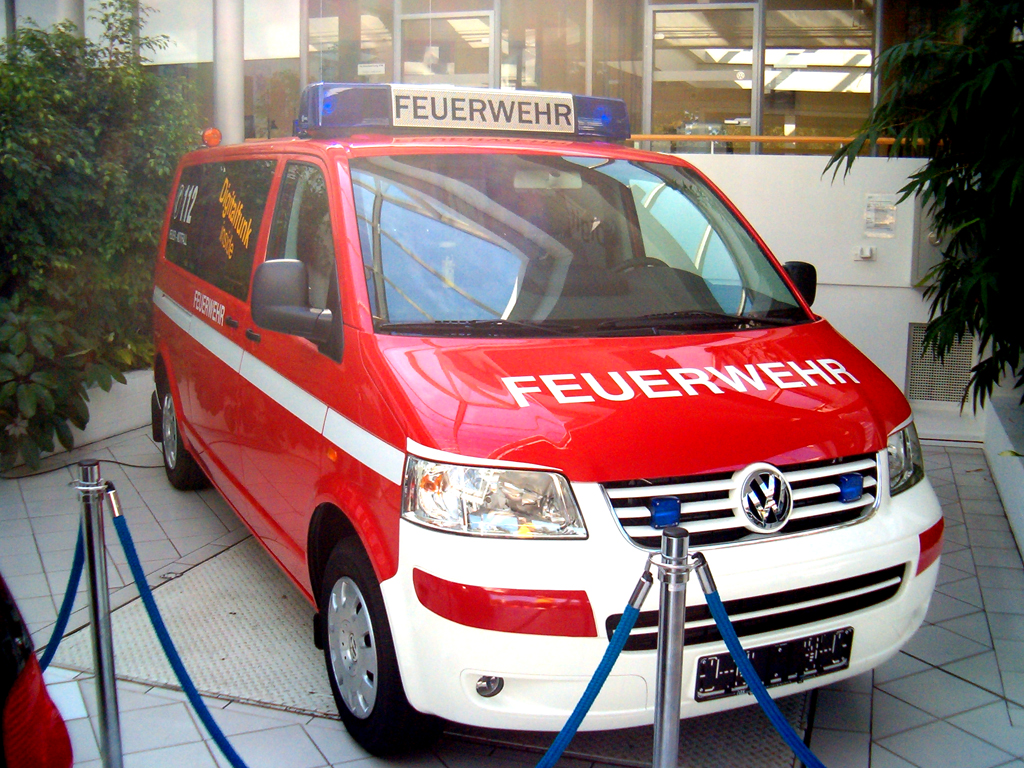
A Volkswagen T5 used as ELW

(Incident command vehicle referred to »Battalion chief«)

Mercedes-Benz Atego 1530 Löschgruppenfahrzeug

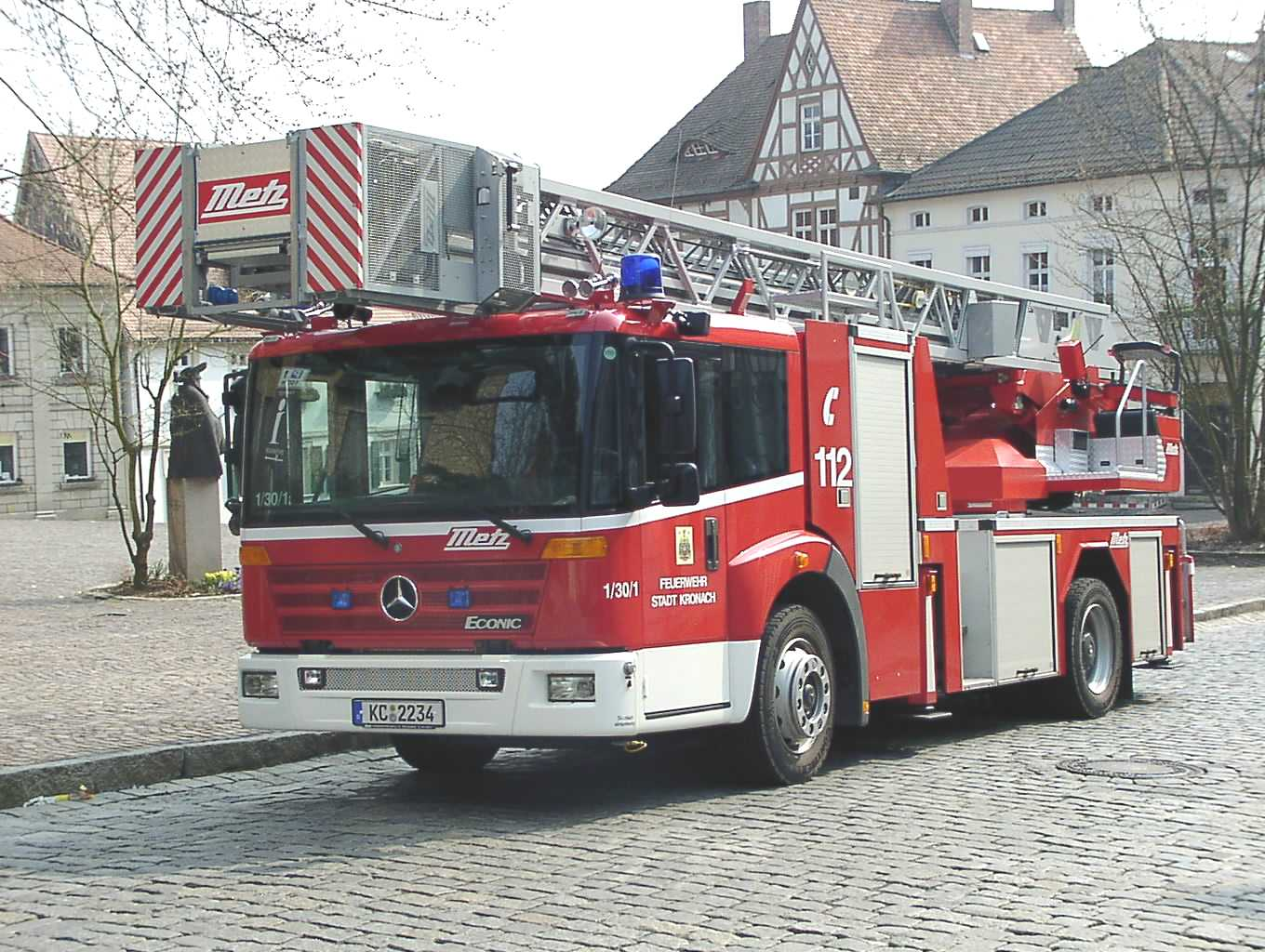
A Mercedes-Benz truck serving as Turntable ladder

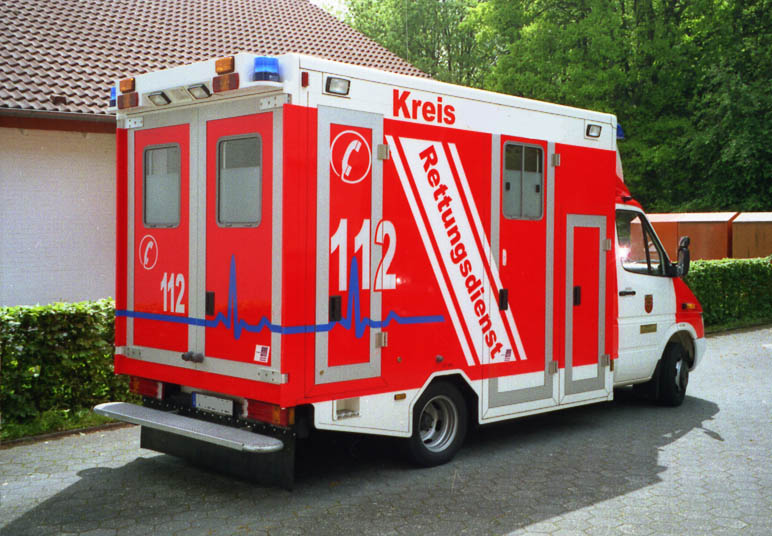
A Mercedes-Benz 413 "Sprinter" used as an Ambulance

1. Command car/Battalion Chief; the Einsatzleitwagen (ELW). This type has 3 subtypes, KdoW, ELW 1 and ELW 2 with the first one usually being a "normal" car and the last one having the size of a coach
2. Small fire trucks; either the Tragkraftspritzenfahrzeug (TSF) or (TSF-W, Tragkraftspritzenfahrzeug mit Wasser with a water tank normally 500 to 750 litres), or the Kleinlöschfahrzeug (KLF). Usually modified panel truck with basic means of firefighting. Those vehicles usually have a portable fire pump with an own engine instead of a fixed one that is powered by the vehicle's engine. The names of the TSF and TSF-W are actually derived from the German term "Tragkraftspritze" which roughly translates into "portable self powered pump". Those vehicles are crewed by a German Staffel (0/1/5/6), but the TSF and the TSF-W types provide enough equipment for a group (0/1/8/9).
3. Engines / Pumpers; the Löschgruppenfahrzeug (LF). Typically a large truck operated by a group and carrying firefighting and rescue gear, nowadays usually with a small water (ranging from 800 to 2500 litres) and foam supply (60 or 120 litres depending on the type of fire engine). Although the crew of the LF consists of a group, the larger types of this engine carry enough equipment for two groups, which often includes a second, portable fire pump.
4. Rescue engines / pumpers, the Hilfeleistungslöschgruppenfahrzeug (HLF). Similar to the engine (LF) but with far more rescue equipment (i.e. Jaws of Life and a winch) on board.
5. Water tenders, the Tanklöschfahrzeug (TLF). Typically a large truck operated by one squad (0/1/2/3) or a German Staffel (a group consisting of 0/1/5/6 (in the case of a TLF 16/25 - a TLF 16/25 with a 1600-litre/min pump and a 2500-litre water tank) and a water supply of several thousand litres). Very often they are equipped with water cannons on the roof and foam cannons.
6. Rescue vehicle, the Rüstwagen (RW). Usually either a larger panel truck or a smaller truck, they are equipped with a broad range of rescue gear i.e. jaws of life, a winch, saws, cutters or work platforms
7. Equipment carriers, the Gerätewagen (GW). A vehicle that comes in all sizes, depending on the equipment stowed. Equipment might be specialized gear for water rescue operations or hazmat. Another variation is the Wechselladerfahrzeug (WLF) which is a specialized, heavy-duty truck WLFs and their modules used by the Cologne Fire Department with a mounted hydraulic crane arm behind the truck's cabin designed to lift heavy containers or modules (called Abrollbehälter) which contain specialized equipment (examples include mobile command modules/trailers, rescue gear modules, Self-Contained Breathing Apparatus modules, HazMat or environmental modules)
8. Aerial ladders, like the Drehleiter (DL or DLK). A large truck with a telescopic ladder (DL), often with an attached bucket or platform at the end (DLK). The most common type is the DLK 23–12, a ladder truck with a platform that can extend to 23 metres height while positioned 12 metres away. (Referred to »Truck« or »Tiller Truck«)
9. Hose carriers, the Schlauchwagen (SW). Typically large trucks with a supply of rolled or folded and pre-coupled hoses (usually 1000 m or 2000 m), in case longer distances have to be bridged.
10. Crew carrier, the Mannschaftstransportwagen (MTW). Usually a minivan or a small bus, used for non-emergency rides, organisational tours or transfer of additional personnel.
11. Ambulances, the Rettungswagen (RTW). Typically based on a delivery-truck chassis with a special body, the RTW provides pre-hospital critical care for one patient. Crew consist of two EMT-I or EMT-P, sometimes augmented by an emergency physician (only when the fire department also operates an EMS).

=== German airport firefighting vehicles ===
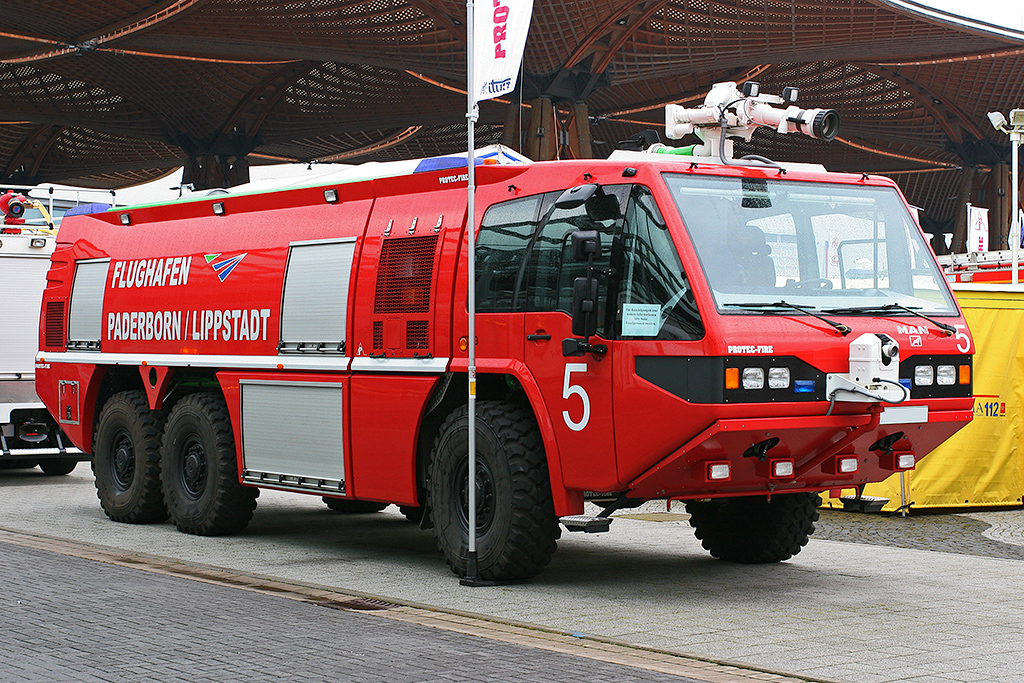
A MAN truck of the airport fire department at Paderborn-Lippstadt

Specialized vehicles are used by German airport fire departments. These include airport crash tenders. In German, they are called Flugfeldlöschfahrzeug (FLFs). These normally have pumps with a large pumping capacity of 10,000 litres/min and have large supplies of either powder or foam (ranging between 300-800 litres) in addition to a standard water tank ranging from 6,000 to 13,000 litres. German airports tend to use crash engines manufactured by Rosenbauer (Rosenbauer Simba, Rosenbauer Panther 8x8 MA 5 or the Rosenbauer Panther 6x6 CA 5). Other manufacturers include Ziegler, Saval-Kronenburg, Amdac Carmichael International, Metz, E-One, Oshkosh, Sides, and Magirus-Deutz/IVECO Magirus.

German military bases are protected by the Bundeswehr-Feuerwehr which currently have three generations of Feuerlösch-KFZ (FlKfz) engines in use. These are specialized engines constructed in three different generations since 1958 and they use specialised military truck chassis (normally MAN/Unimog). The first generation covers engines constructed between 1958 and 1978 (known as the FlKfz 2400).

The second-generation engines FlKfz 1000 (equipment manufacturer: Metz, now part of Rosenbauer), FlKfz 3000 (equipment manufacturer: cooperation between Bachert and Albert Ziegler), FlKfz 3500/400/750 ((equipment manufacturer: cooperation between Bachert and Albert Ziegler) and FlKfz 8000/800 ((equipment manufacturer: Schoerling-Brock), (all constructed by Faun GmbH) except the FlKfz 1000 [constructed on a Mercedes Benz Unimog U 1300 L chassis] were first put into service in 1979.

The third generation entered active service in 2005. Most of the older FlKfz 8000/800 were replaced by the new Ziegler Z8 ((FLF 80/125-12,5 Z8 "Advancer")). Unlike the second-generation engines, this new series of 16 Z8 engines is no longer a military-specific design. The first generation of FlKfz 2400 was replaced by LF 16/12 (originally based on the Daimler-Benz 1017 chassis) with the design changes being incorporated into the Mercedes-Benz Atego chassis. Furthermore, the 3rd generation has been supplemented by the TLF 20-28 and the RW (Rüstwagen 2) on MAN 18.280 chassis as well as the TLF 20–45 on the Mercedes-Benz Unimog U 5000 chassis. All of these vehicles were equipped by Ziegler.

More information on the military vehicles mentioned above are available below:

Standard ELW 1/command vehicle:

First generation:

- 1st Generation
- FlKfz 3800-400

Second generation:

- FlKfz 1000
- FlKfz 2400
- FlKfz 3000
- FlKfz 3500
- FlKfz 8000

Third generation:

- U 5000a
- Z8
- LF 16/12 on MB Atego

== Dispatching and alerting ==
=== Radios ===
German fire brigades use TETRA digital radios to coordinate their efforts. The civil services of authorities and organisations with security duties (Behörden und Organisationen mit Sicherheitsaufgaben, BOS) as well as the German Armed Forces are going to use compatible TETRA systems. The digital BOS radio network, with approximately 1,109,000 users (as of March 2023), is the world's largest of its kind. In 2007, the responsible ministers estimated the cost of 4,5 Billion Euros.

Till the 2020 the radios of fire departement were analog systems, using the 4-metre and 2-metre bands (74.215 to 87.255 MHz (base stations) and 167.56 to 173.98 MHz (portable radios)).

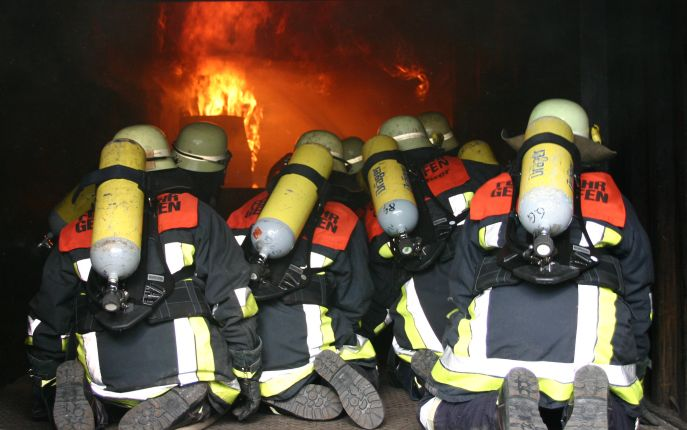
German firefighters during an exercise

=== Identification ===
Radio identification names consist of five parts:

1. Name of the organisation, i.e. "FLORIAN" for the fire services
2. Name of the city or county the brigade is based, e.g. "MAGDEBURG"
3. Two digits referring to the specific area or station, e.g. "01"
4. Two digits referring to the type of vehicle, e.g. "33" for a ladder (Tiller truck)
5. Two digits referring to which one it is, e.g. "01" for the first vehicle of its type.

For example, the radio identification "Florian Magdeburg 01-33-01" would describe the first ladder of station 1, operated by the Fire department of the city of Magdeburg.

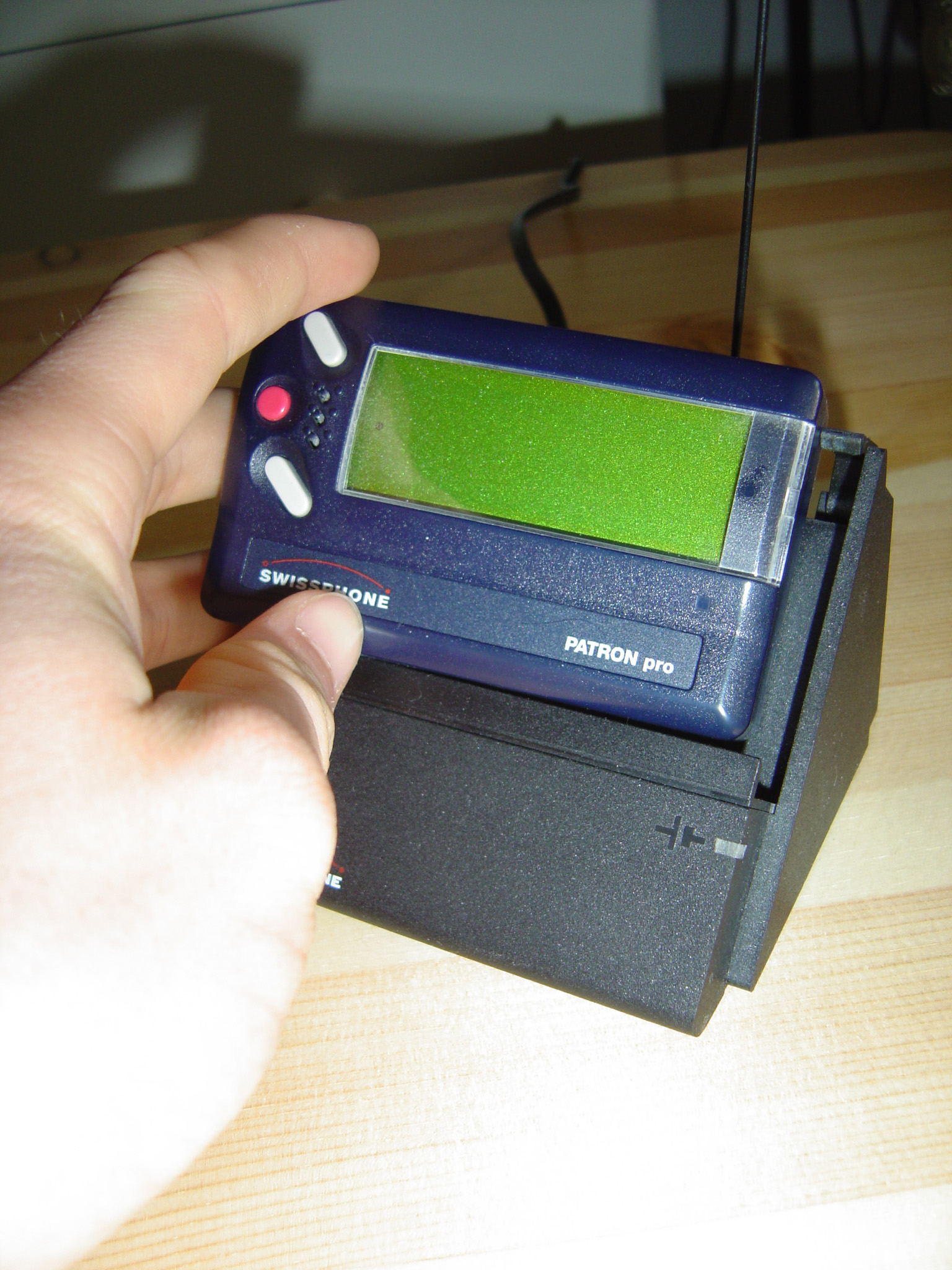
A "Swissphone PatronPRO", one of the most favoured pagers for emergency services

Although not in accordance with the respective service regulation ("Dienstvorschrift"), these identifications are sometimes shortened for the sake of fast radio contact and when there can be no doubt that the vehicle is unique. For example, the ELW currently on scene may simply refer to himself as "1-11" or "Florian 1-11", instead of using the whole sequence when the crew is certain that there are no other companies involved. Because the German Fire Services are terms of the federal states like Bavaria, Hesse or Berlin this may vary from state to state. The radio identification name for the same ladder in Bavaria can be "Florian Geretsried 30/1" for example.

=== Alerting the fire stations ===
All fires or emergencies requiring assistance from the fire service can be reported using the toll-free European emergency telephone number "112". The caller will be connected to the command centre responsible for their area and can report the emergency. The dispatcher will then decide whom to alert. If professional fire brigades are at the station, they will be alerted by klaxon, announcement or display messages. During the night, the alarm circuits are often wired to turn on the lights in the crew quarters.

Voluntary fire brigades are almost everywhere equipped with pagers, some only informing the firefighters of an emergency (spoken messages on a pager), some even displaying short messages (display pagers such as the Motorola LX2/LX2plus or LX4/LX4plus) with the type of call, incident address, map coordinates, time and date of call and other important details. In some areas sirens are still in use, sometimes even as the primary means of alerting firefighters.

German siren signal "fire alert"

A few fire brigades are experimenting with a GSM-based alarm circuit. The firefighter will then get either a message on his mobile phone or a machine will call him. This method has proven successful in areas where constant radio contact for pagers can not be guaranteed, e.g. in mountainous areas.

== Sports ==
To create an incentive for sports, fitness and health the German firefighting fitness badge can be awarded to any member of the German fire services.

== See also ==
- Fire service vehicles in Germany
- Feuerschutzpolizei
- Fire department
- Volunteer fire department
